= Mountaineering =

Activity involving ascending mountains

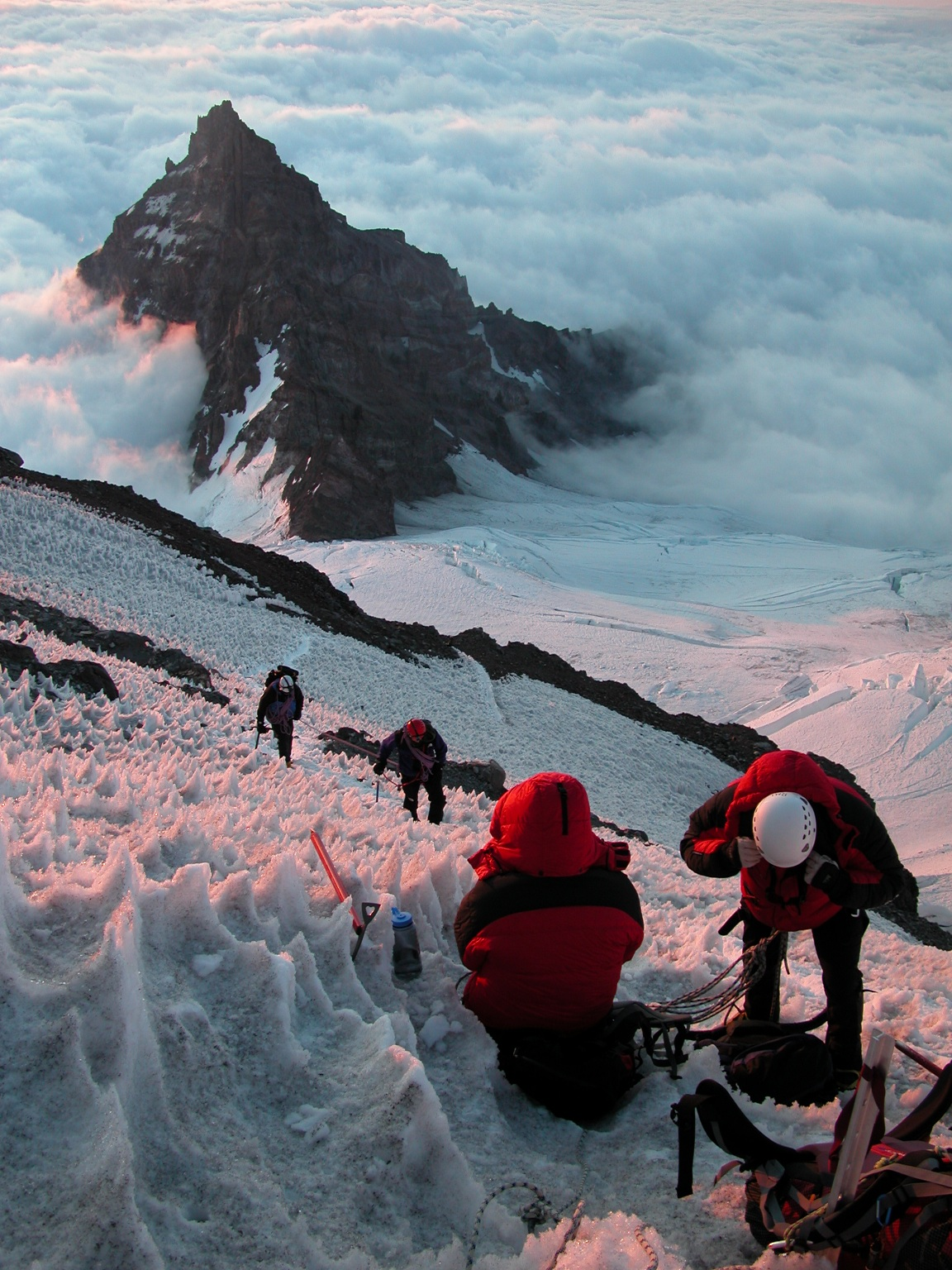
Climbers ascending Mount Rainier looking at Little Tahoma Peak, United States

Mountaineering is a set of outdoor activities that involves ascending mountains. Mountaineering-related activities include traditional outdoor climbing, skiing, and traversing via ferratas that have become sports in their own right. Indoor climbing, sport climbing, and bouldering are also considered variants of mountaineering by some, but are part of a wide group of mountain sports. In everyday language, the term "mountaineering" is synonymous with mountain climbing or alpinism.

Unlike most sports, mountaineering lacks widely applied formal rules, regulations, and governance; mountaineers adhere to a large variety of techniques and philosophies (including grading and guidebooks) when climbing mountains. Numerous local alpine clubs support mountaineers by hosting resources and social activities. A federation of alpine clubs, the International Climbing and Mountaineering Federation (UIAA), is the International Olympic Committee-recognized world organization for mountaineering and climbing. The consequences of mountaineering on the natural environment can be seen in terms of individual components of the environment (land relief, soil, vegetation, fauna, and landscape) and the location/zone of mountaineering activity (hiking, trekking, or climbing zone). However, it should be borne in mind that tourism in mountain areas, by shifting the sector from agriculture to services, has a positive balance of change - agriculture is more invasive. Mountaineering impacts communities on economic, political, social, and cultural levels, often leading to changes in people's worldviews influenced by globalization, specifically foreign cultures and lifestyles. In terms of both its impact on the natural environment and local communities, the significance of this impact depends on the location in the vertical (altitude above sea level) and horizontal (zone) dimensions, and is therefore an example of environmental determinism.

== History ==
=== Early mountaineering ===
Humans have been present in mountains since prehistory. The remains of Ötzi, who lived in the 4th millennium BC, were found in a glacier in the Ötztal Alps. However, the highest mountains were rarely visited early on, and were often associated with supernatural or religious concepts. Nonetheless, there are many documented examples of people climbing mountains prior to the formal development of the sport in the 19th century, although many of these stories are sometimes considered fictional or legendary.

The famous poet Petrarch describes his 26 April 1336 ascent of Mount Ventoux (1,912 m or 6,273 ft) in one of his epistolae familiares, claiming to be inspired by Philip V of Macedon's ascent of Mount Haemo.

For most of antiquity, climbing mountains was a practical or symbolic activity, usually undertaken for economic, political, or religious purposes. A commonly cited example is the 1492 ascent of Mont Aiguille (2,085 m (6,841 ft)) by Antoine de Ville, a French military officer and lord of Domjulien and Beaupré. Because ropes, ladders and iron hooks were used, and because it was the first climb of any technical difficulty to be officially verified, this ascent is widely recognized as being the birth of mountaineering.

In the Andes, around the late 1400s and early 1500s, many ascents were made of extremely high peaks by the Incas and their subjects. The highest they are known for certain to have climbed is 6739 m at the summit of Volcan Llullaillaco.

Conrad Gessner, a mid-16th Century physician, botanist and naturalist from Switzerland, is widely recognized as being the first person to hike and climb for sheer pleasure.

=== The Enlightenment and the Golden Age of Alpinism ===
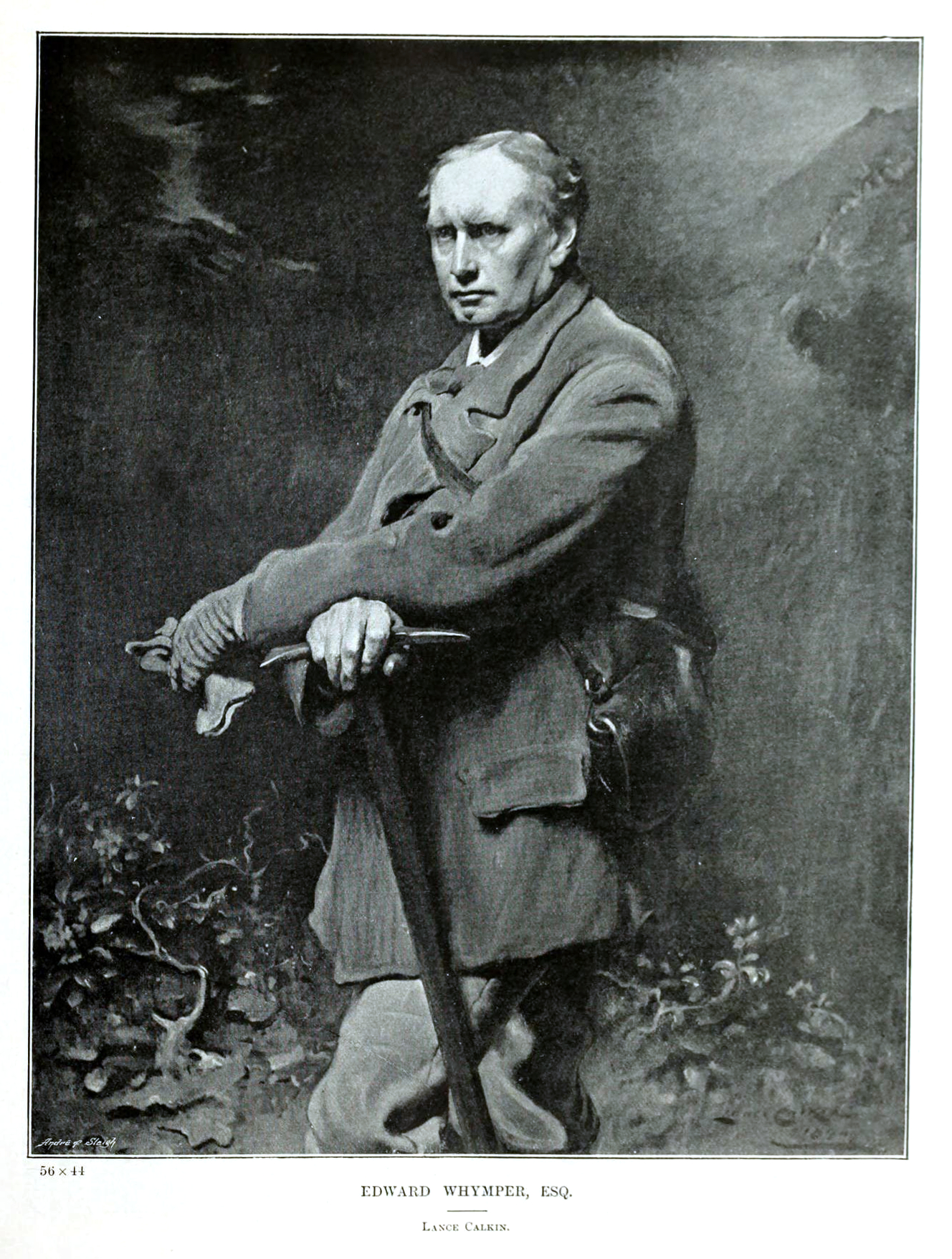
Edward Whymper (1840–1911), painting by Lance Calkin

The Age of Enlightenment and the Romantic era marked a change of attitudes towards high mountains. In 1757, Swiss scientist Horace-Bénédict de Saussure made the first of several unsuccessful attempts on Mont Blanc in France. He then offered a reward to anyone who could climb the mountain, which was claimed in 1786 by Jacques Balmat and Michel-Gabriel Paccard. The climb is usually considered an epochal event in the history of mountaineering, a symbolic mark of the birth of the sport.

By the early 19th century, many of the alpine peaks were reached, including the Grossglockner in 1800, the Ortler in 1804, the Jungfrau in 1811, the Finsteraarhorn in 1812, and the Breithorn in 1813. In 1808, Marie Paradis became the first woman to climb Mont Blanc, followed in 1838 by Henriette d'Angeville.

The beginning of mountaineering as a sport in the UK is generally dated to the ascent of the Wetterhorn in 1854 by English mountaineer Sir Alfred Wills, who made mountaineering fashionable in Britain. This inaugurated what became known as the Golden Age of Alpinism, with the first mountaineering club – the Alpine Club – being founded in 1857.

One of the most dramatic events was the spectacular first ascent of the Matterhorn in 1865 by a party led by English illustrator Edward Whymper, in which four of the party members fell to their deaths. By this point, the sport of mountaineering had largely reached its modern form, with a large body of professional guides, equipment, and methodologies.

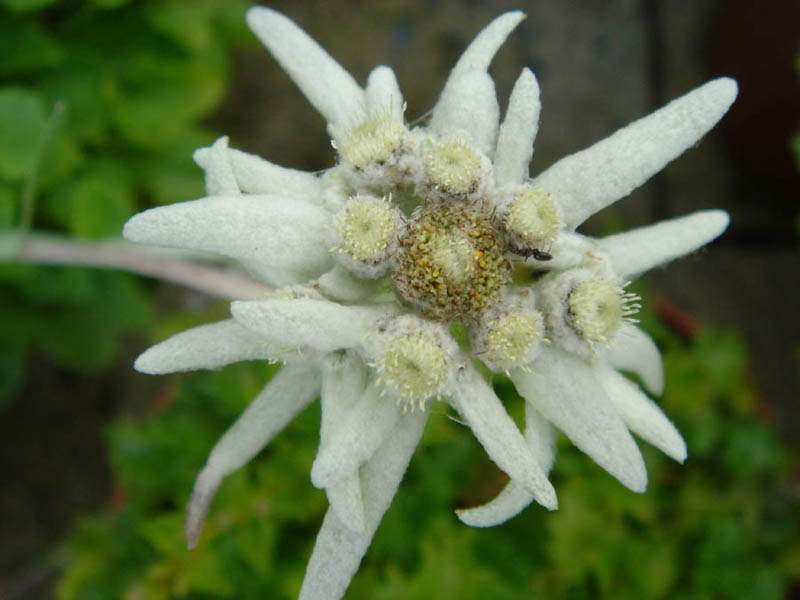
Edelweiss, a plant associated with mountain sports

In the early years of the "golden age", scientific pursuits were intermixed with the sport, such as by the physicist John Tyndall. In the later years, it shifted to a more competitive orientation as pure sportsmen came to dominate the London-based Alpine Club and alpine mountaineering overall. The first president of the Alpine Club, John Ball, is considered to be the pioneer of climbing the Dolomites, which for decades were the focus of climbers like Paul Grohmann and Angelo Dibona. At that time, the edelweiss also established itself as a symbol of alpinists and mountaineers.

=== Expansion around the world ===
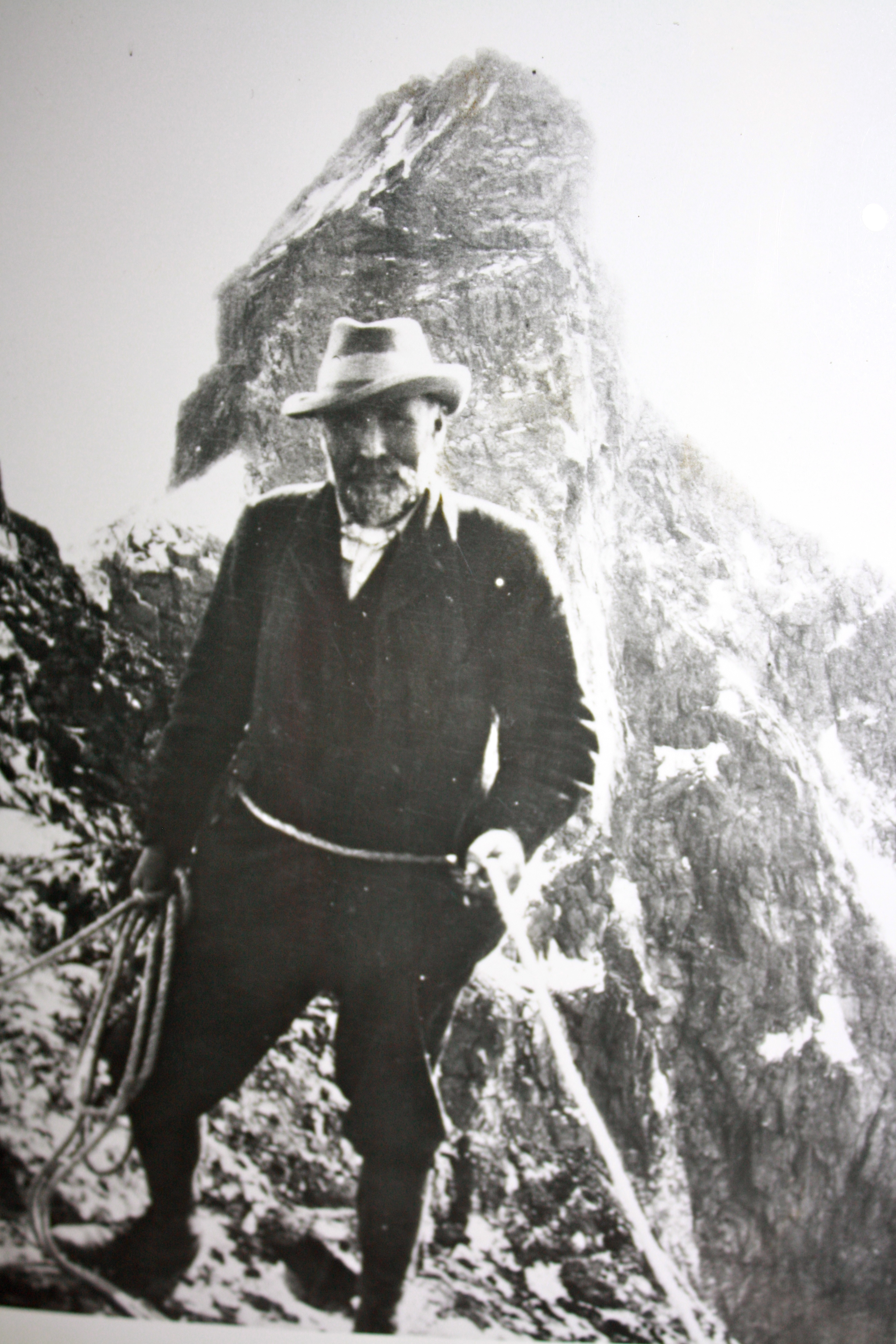
British mountaineer William Cecil Slingsby became known as the father of Norwegian mountaineering and contributed greatly to its popularization with his classic book Norway, the Northern Playground.

In the 19th century, the focus of mountaineering turned towards mountains beyond the Alps. One of the earliest mountain areas to be explored beyond the Alps in the 19th century were the mountains of Norway—particularly Jotunheimen—where British mountaineers such as William Cecil Slingsby, Harold Raeburn and Howard Priestman were early pioneers. Slingsby's book Norway, the Northern Playground contributed greatly to the popularization of mountaineering in Norway among the international mountaineering community. Around the turn of the century, a young generation of Norwegian mountaineers such as George Paus, Eilert Sundt and Kristian Tandberg appeared, and later founded Norsk Tindeklub, the third oldest mountaineering association in the world. By the turn of the 20th century, mountaineering had acquired a more international flavour.

In 1897, Mount Saint Elias (18,008 ft (5,489 m)) on the Alaska-Yukon border was summitted by the Duke of the Abruzzi and party. In 1879–1880, the exploration of the highest Andes in South America began when English mountaineer Edward Whymper climbed Chimborazo (20,549 ft (6,263 m)) and explored the mountains of Ecuador. It took until the late 19th century for European explorers to penetrate Africa. Mount Kilimanjaro in Africa was climbed in 1889 by Austrian mountaineer Ludwig Purtscheller and German geologist Hans Meyer, Mount Kenya in 1899 by Halford Mackinder.

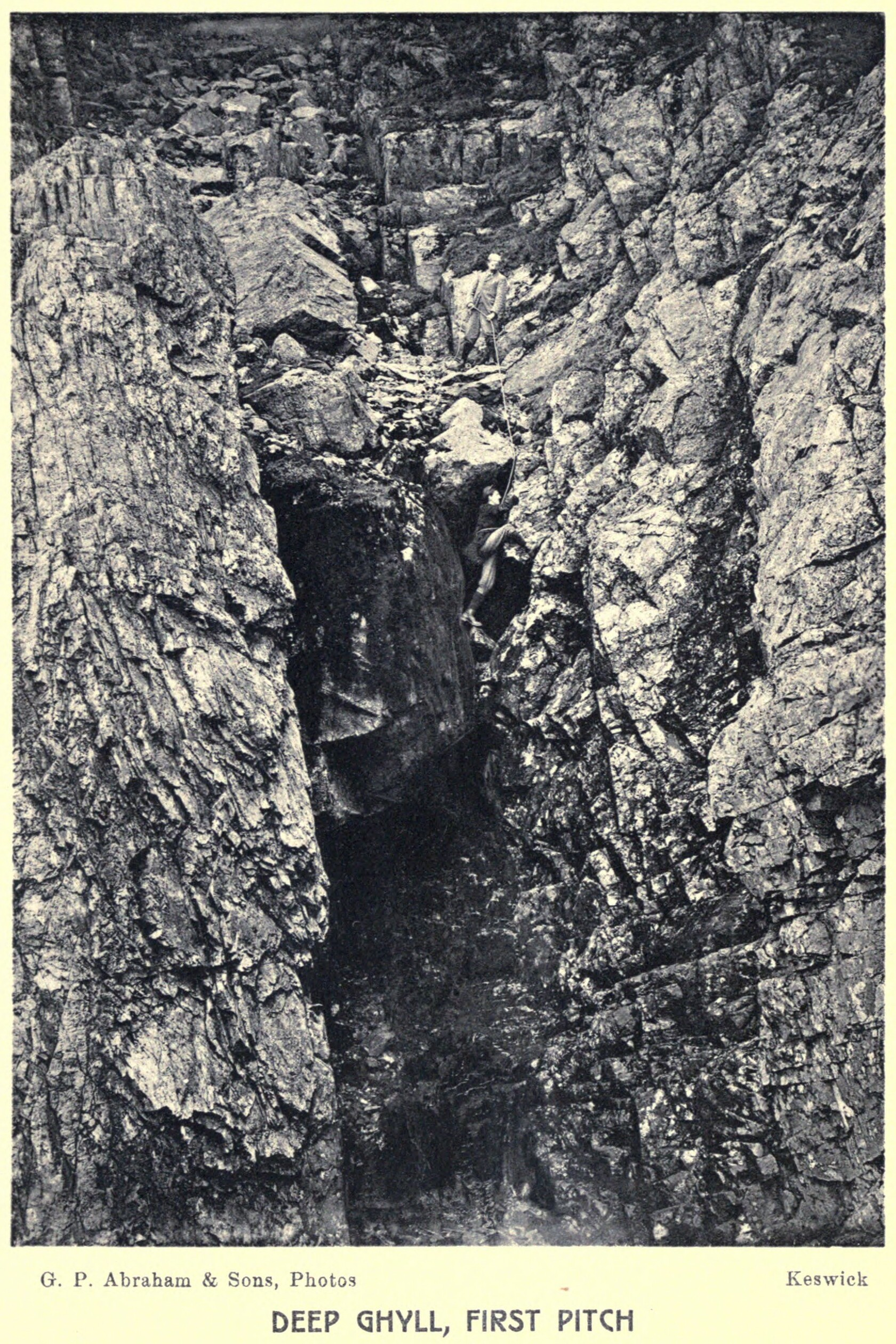
Mountaineers, c. 1900

=== The last frontier: The Himalayas ===
The greatest mountain range to be conquered was the Himalayas in South Asia. They had initially been surveyed by the British Empire for military and strategic reasons. In 1892, Sir William Martin Conway explored the Karakoram Himalayas, and climbed a peak of 23,000 ft (7,000 m). In 1895, Albert F. Mummery died while attempting Nanga Parbat, while in 1899 Douglas Freshfield took an expedition to the snowy regions of Sikkim.

In 1899, 1903, 1906, and 1908, American mountaineer Fanny Bullock Workman (one of the first professional female mountaineers) made ascents in the Himalayas, including one of the Nun Kun peaks (23,300 ft (7,100 m)). A number of Gurkha sepoys were trained as expert mountaineers by Charles Granville Bruce, and a good deal of exploration was accomplished by them.

In 1902, the Eckenstein–Crowley Expedition, led by English mountaineer Oscar Eckenstein and English occultist Aleister Crowley was the first to attempt to scale K2. They reached 22,000 feet (6,700 m) before turning back due to weather and other mishaps. Undaunted, in 1905 Crowley led the first expedition to Kangchenjunga, the third highest mountain in the world, in an attempt which Isserman, Angas Weaver and Molenaar describe as "misguided" and "lamentable" due to Crowley's many failings as an expedition leader.

Eckenstein was also a pioneer in developing new equipment and climbing methods. He started using shorter ice axes that could be used single-handedly, designed the modern crampons, and improved on the nail patterns used for the climbing boots.

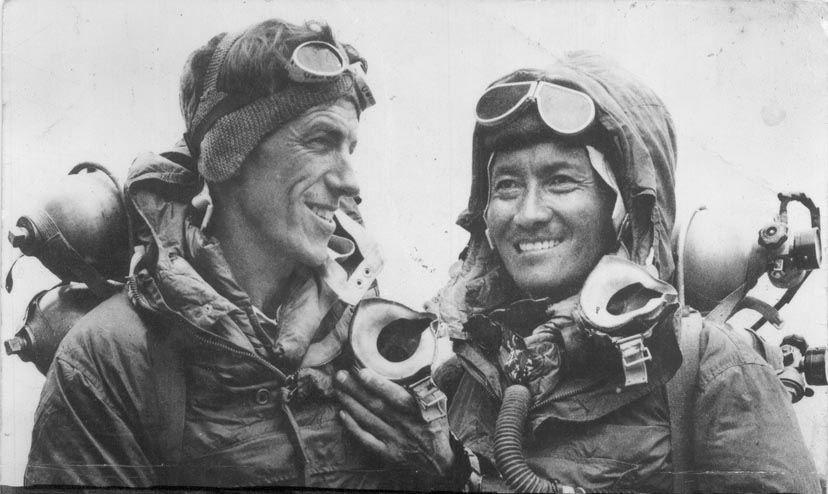
Edmund Hillary (left) and Tenzing Norgay after successfully completing the first ascent of Mount Everest, 29 May 1953

By the 1950s, all the eight-thousanders but two had been climbed starting with Annapurna in 1950 by Maurice Herzog and Louis Lachenal on the 1950 French Annapurna expedition. The highest of these peaks Mount Everest was climbed in 1953 after the British had made several attempts in the 1920s; the 1922 expedition reached 8,320 metres (27,300 ft) before being aborted on the third summit attempt after an avalanche killed seven porters. The 1924 expedition saw another height record achieved but still failed to reach the summit with confirmation when George Mallory and Andrew Irvine disappeared on the final attempt. The summit was finally reached on 29 May 1953 by Sir Edmund Hillary and Tenzing Norgay from the south side in Nepal.

Just a few months later, Hermann Buhl made the first ascent of Nanga Parbat (8,125 m), on the 1953 German–Austrian Nanga Parbat expedition, completing the last 1,300 meters walking alone, self-medicating with pervitin (based on the stimulant methamphetamine used by soldiers during World War II), the vasodilator padutin, and a stimulant tea made from coca leaves. K2 (8,611m), the second-highest peak in the world, was first scaled in 1954 by Lino Lacedelli and Achille Compagnoni. In 1964, the final eight-thousander to be climbed was Shishapangma (8,013m), the lowest of all the 8,000-metre peaks. Reinhold Messner from the Dolomites mountain range (Italy) was then the first to climb all eight-thousanders up to 1986, in addition to being the first without supplemental oxygen. In 1978 he climbed Mount Everest with Peter Habeler without supplemental oxygen, the first men to do so.

=== Today ===
Historically important mountaineering sites, like Everest, increasingly have changing, sometimes dangerous conditions because of the effects of climate change. Already dangerous routes, such as iceflows become less predictable with seasonal changes.

Long the domain of the wealthy elite and their agents, the emergence of the middle-class in the 19th and 20th centuries resulted in mass interest in mountaineering. It became a popular pastime and hobby of many people. Some have come to criticize the sport as becoming too much of a tourist activity. The field has, however, also opened up to Indigenous climbers, such as Cecilia Llusco Alaña, a member of the Bolivian cholita climbers, who, like the Himalayan sherpas previously worked as porters, high altitude cooks or guides but who now climb peaks in their own right.

== Organisation ==
=== Activities ===
There are different activities associated with the sport.

- Traditional mountaineering involves identifying a specific mountain and route to climb, and executing the plan by whatever means appropriate. A mountain summit is almost always the goal. This activity is strongly associated with aid climbing and free climbing, as well as the use of ice axe and crampons on glaciers and similar terrain.
- Ski mountaineering involves skiing on mountainous terrain, usually in terrain much more rugged than typical cross-country skiing. Unlike traditional mountaineering, routes are less well-defined and summiting may not be the main goal.
- Peak bagging is the general activity of ascending peaks that are on a list of notable mountains, such as the 4000m peaks of the Alps.
- Enchainment is climbing more than one significant summit in one outing, usually on the same day.
- Climbing via ferratas involves traversing ladder-like paths on highly exposed terrain.
- Ice climbing which involves proceeding on steep sections of blank ice with crampons and ice axes. This activity often requires progressing on steep and blank sections of ice. Most mountaineers have to rely on ice climbing skills to climb upon the higher peaks in the European Alps, Himalayas and Canadian ranges.

=== Rules and governance ===
Mountaineering lacks formal rules – though appropriately empowered bodies make many pertaining to specific use of mountains and practices on them. In theory, any person may climb a mountain and call themselves a mountaineer. In practice, the sport is defined by the safe and necessary use of technical skills in mountainous terrain: in particular, roped climbing and snow travel abilities. A variety of techniques have been developed to help people climb mountains that are widely applied among practitioners of the sport.

Despite its lack of defined rules and non-competitive nature, certain aspects of mountaineering have much of the trappings of an organized sport, with recognition of specific climbing activities – including climbing wall-based competition – by the International Olympic Committee; on a club level, the prominent international sport federation the UIAA counts numerous national alpine clubs as its members, while others, such as The Mountaineers and the French Federation of Mountaineering and Climbing, remain independent.

The premier award in mountaineering is the privately granted Piolet d'Or, which has expanded from a single recognition to multiple. While there are many competitions, particularly in toproped climbing wall disciplines, there are no "official" world championships or other similar competitions for mountaineering broadly.

== Terrain and techniques ==
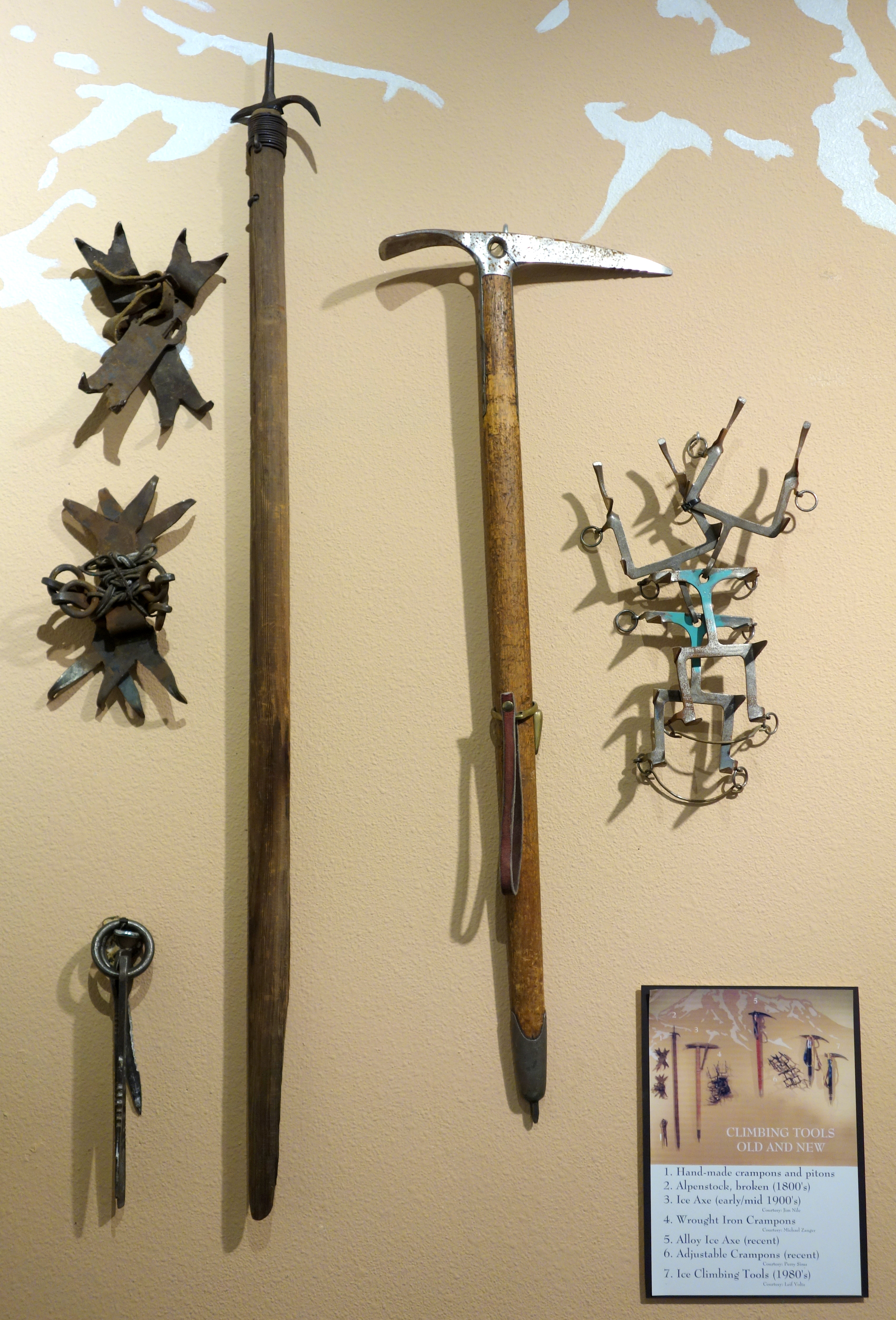
Antique climbing tools

Mountaineering techniques vary greatly depending on location, season, terrain, and route. Both techniques and hazards vary by terrain, spanning trails, rock, snow, and ice. Mountaineers must possess adequate food, water, information, equipment, stamina, and skill to complete their tasks.

=== Walk-up terrain ===
The term "walk-up" or "trek" is used to describe terrain in which no technical equipment is needed. To traverse this terrain, mountaineers hike long distances to a base camp or the beginning of rough terrain, either following trails or using navigation techniques to travel cross-country. Hiking may be a strenuous activity, and adequate physical fitness and familiarity with the wilderness is necessary to complete a hike; it is also a prerequisite of success in all aspects of mountaineering.

=== Rock ===
Alpine rock climbing involves technical skills including the ability to place anchors into the rock to safely ascend a mountain. In some cases, climbers may have to climb multiple pitches of rock to reach the top. Typically, for any one pitch, there is a climber who ascends the rock, and a belayer who is stationary and creates tension on the rope to catch the climber should they fall. The first climber, called the leader, will reach a point on the rock and then build an anchor, which will secure subsequent climbers. Anchors could be created by using slings around a tree or boulder, or by using protection devices like cams and nuts.

Once anchored, the leader will then belay the climber coming up from below. Once the follower reaches the leader, the leader will often transfer all necessary protection devices (known as a rack) to the follower. The follower then becomes the leader and will ascend the next pitch. This process will continue until the climbers either reach the top, or run into different terrain.

For extremely vertical rocks, or to overcome certain logistical challenges, climbers may use aid climbing techniques. This involves the use of equipment, such as ladders, fixed lines, and ascenders to help the climber push themself up the rock.

In alpine climbing, it is common for climbers to see routes of mixed terrain. This means climbers may need to move efficiently from climbing glacier, to rock, to ice, back and forth in a number of variations.

=== Snow and ice ===
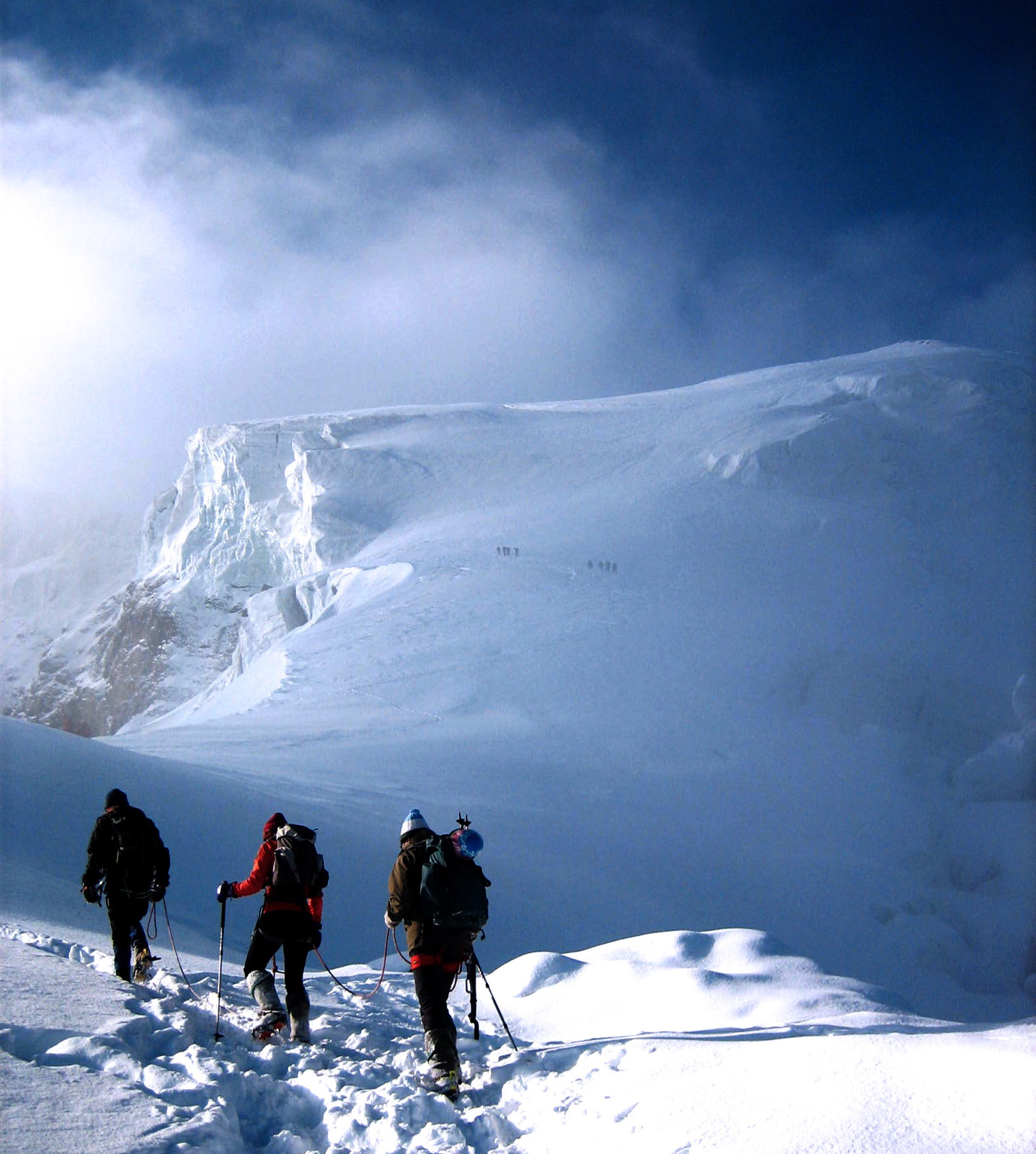
Mountaineers proceed across snow fields on Ortler; other climbers are visible further up the slopes.

Compacted snow conditions allow mountaineers to progress on foot. Frequently crampons are required to travel efficiently and safely over snow and ice. Crampons attach to the bottom of a mountaineer's boots and provide additional traction on hard snow and ice. For loose snow, crampons are less suitable, and snowshoes or skis may be preferred. Using various techniques from alpine skiing to ascend/descend a mountain is a form of the sport by itself, called ski mountaineering.

Ascending and descending a steep snow slope safely requires the use of an ice axe and different footwork techniques that have been developed over the past century, such as the French technique and German technique. Teams of climbers may choose to attach everyone together with a rope, to form a rope team. The team may then secure themselves by attaching the rope to anchors. These anchors are sometimes unreliable and include snow stakes or pickets, deadman devices called flukes, or buried equipment or rocks. Bollards (post-like structures made from consolidated snow or ice by carving out the area around them) also sometimes serve as anchors. Alternatively, a roped team may choose not to use anchors; instead, all members of the team will prepare to use their ice axes to self-arrest in the event of a team member falling.

It is not always wise for climbers to form a rope team, since one falling climber may pull the entire team off the mountain. However, the risks of individual, unprotected travel are often so great that groups have no choice but to form a rope team.

For example, when traveling over glaciers, crevasses pose a grave danger to a climber who is not roped in. These giant cracks in the ice are not always visible as snow can be blown and freeze over the top to make a snowbridge. At times snowbridges can be as thin as a few inches and may collapse from people walking over them. Should a climber fall, being protected by a rope greatly reduces the risk of injury or death. The other members of the rope team may proceed with a crevasse rescue to pull the fallen climber from the crevasse.

For extremely slippery or steep snow, ice, and mixed rock and ice terrain climbers must use more advanced techniques, called ice climbing or mixed climbing. Specialized tools such as ice screws and ice picks help climbers build anchors and move up the ice, as well as traditional rock climbing equipment for anchoring in mixed terrain. Often, mountaineers climbing steep snow or mixed snowy rock terrain will not use a fixed belay. Instead, each climber on the team will climb at the same time while attached to anchors, in groups of two. This allows for safety should the entire team be taken off their feet which also allows for greater speed than the traditional technique of belaying one climber at a time. This technique is known as simul-climbing or a running belay and is sometimes also used on ice, however, the risk of dropping frequently displaced ice on the lower team member(s) limits its usefulness on ice. Traditional belays are also used; in this case, this is sometimes necessary due to ice fall hazard, steepness, or other factors.

== Shelter ==
Climbers use a few different forms of shelter depending on the situation and conditions; alpine shelters or arctic shelters. Shelter is a very important aspect of safety for the climber as weather in the mountains may be very unpredictable. Tall mountains may require many days of camping.

Short trips lasting less than a day generally do not require shelter, although for safety, most mountaineers will carry an emergency shelter, such as a light bivouac sack.

=== Camping ===
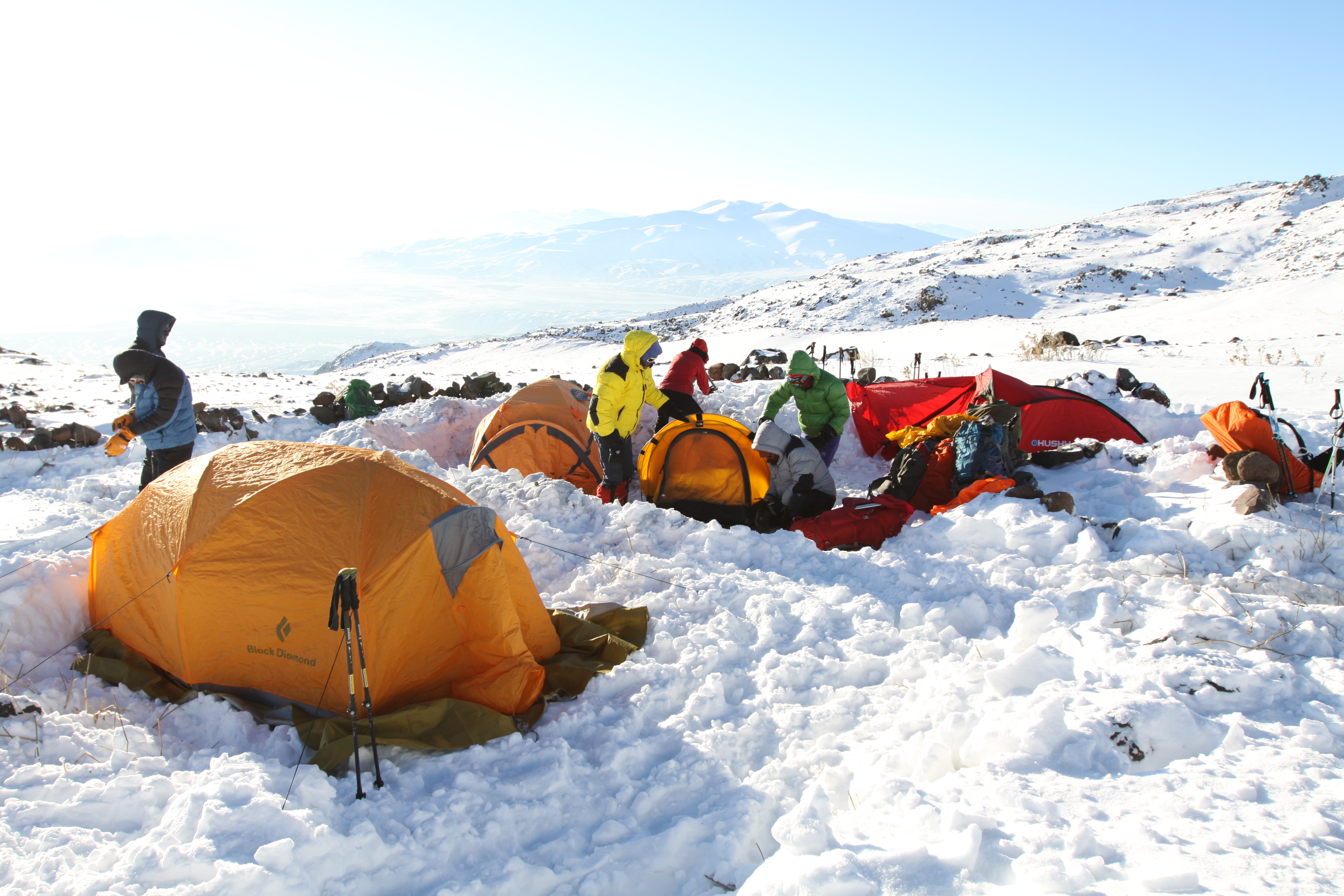
Winter campers bivouaced in the snow

Typical shelters used for camping include tents and bivouac sacks. The ability of these shelters to provide protection from the elements is dependent on their design. Mountaineers who climb in areas with cold weather or snow and ice will use more heavy-duty shelters than those who climb in more forgiving environments.

In remote locations, mountaineers will set up a "base camp", which is an area used for staging attempts at nearby summits. Base camps are positioned to be relatively safe from harsh terrain and weather. Where the summit cannot be reached from base camp in a single day, a mountain will have additional camps above base camp. For popular mountains, base camps may be at a fixed location and become famous. Examples include the Everest base camps and Camp Muir.

=== Hut ===
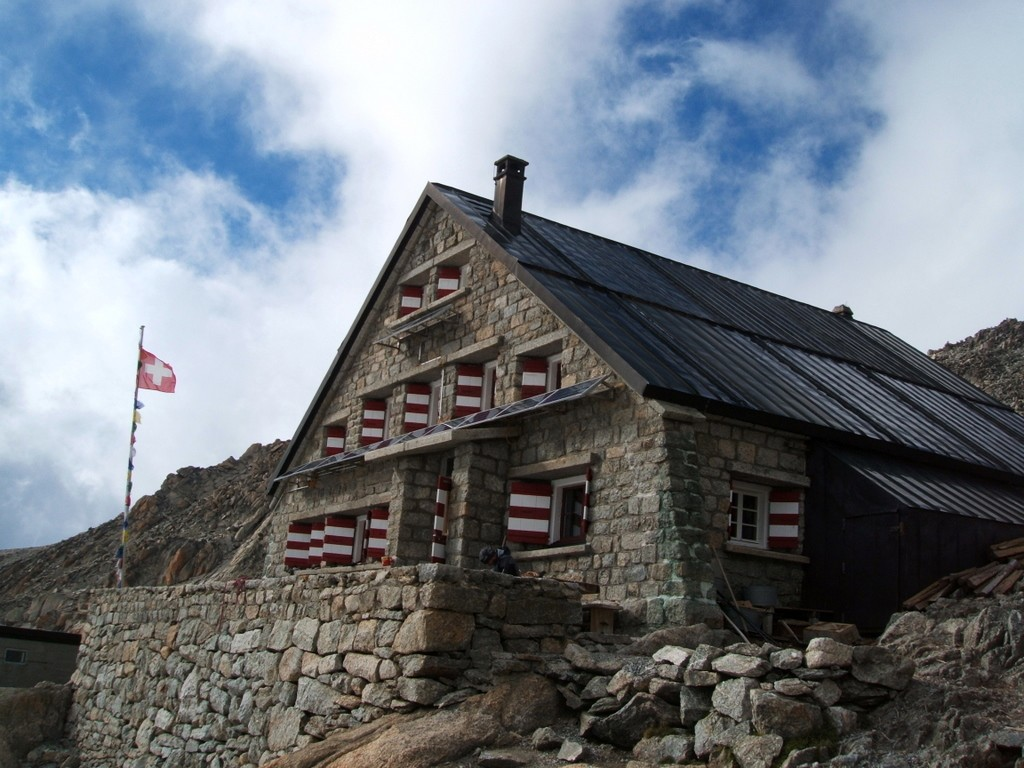
Cabane du Trient, a mountain hut in the Swiss Alps

Camping is not always an option, or may not be suitable if a mountain is close to civilization. Some regions may legally prohibit primitive camping due to concern for the environment, or due to issues with crowds. In lieu of camping, mountaineers may choose to stay in mountain huts.

The European alpine regions, in particular, have a large network of huts. Such huts exist at many different heights, including in the high mountains themselves – in extremely remote areas, more rudimentary shelters may exist. The mountain huts are of varying size and quality, but each is typically centred on a communal dining room and have dormitories equipped with mattresses, blankets or duvets, and pillows; guests are expected to bring and use their own sleeping bag liners. The facilities are usually rudimentary, but, given their locations, huts offer vital shelter, make routes more widely accessible (by allowing journeys to be broken and reducing the weight of equipment needing to be carried), and offer good value. In Europe, all huts are staffed during the summer (mid-June to mid-September) and some are staffed in the spring (mid-March to mid-May). Elsewhere, huts may also be open in the fall. Huts also may have a part that is always open, but unstaffed, a so-called winter hut.

When open and staffed, the huts are generally run by full-time employees, but some are staffed on a voluntary basis by members of alpine clubs. The manager of the hut, termed a guardian or warden in Europe, will usually also sell refreshments and meals, both to those visiting only for the day and to those staying overnight. The offering is surprisingly wide, given that most supplies, often including fresh water, must be flown in by helicopter, and may include glucose-based snacks (such as candy bars) on which climbers and walkers wish to stock up, cakes and pastries made at the hut, a variety of hot and cold drinks (including beer and wine), and high carbohydrate dinners in the evenings. Not all huts offer a catered service, though, and visitors may need to provide for themselves. Some huts offer facilities for both, enabling visitors wishing to keep costs down to bring their own food and cooking equipment and to cater using the facilities provided. Booking for overnight stays at huts is deemed obligatory, and in many cases is essential as some popular huts, even with more than 100 bed spaces, may be full during good weather and at weekends. Once made, the cancellation of a reservation is advised as a matter of courtesy – and, indeed, potentially of safety, as many huts keep a record of where climbers and walkers state they plan to walk to next. Most huts may be contacted by telephone and most take credit cards as a means of payment.

In the UK, the term "hut" is used for any cottage or cabin used as a base for walkers or climbers. These are mostly owned by mountaineering clubs for use by members or visiting clubs and generally do not have wardens or permanent staff, but have cooking and washing facilities and heating. In the Scottish Highlands small simple unstaffed shelters without cooking facilities known as "bothies" are maintained to break up cross country long routes and act as base camps to certain mountains.

=== Snow cave ===
Where conditions permit, snow caves are another way to shelter high on the mountain. Some climbers do not use tents at high altitudes unless the snow conditions do not allow for snow caving, since snow caves are silent and much warmer than tents. They can be built relatively easily, given sufficient time, using a snow shovel. The temperature of a correctly made snow cave will hover around freezing, which relative to outside temperatures can be very warm. They can be dug anywhere where there is at least four feet of snow. The addition of a good quality bivouac bag and closed cell foam sleeping mat will also increase the warmth of the snow cave. Another shelter that works well is a quinzee, which is excavated from a pile of snow that has been work hardened or sintered (typically by stomping). Igloos are used by some climbers, but are deceptively difficult to build and require specific snow conditions.

== Physical preparation ==
Mountaineering combines sustained aerobic effort across long days at altitude with concentric loading on the ascent and eccentric loading on the descent. Physical preparation typically targets several distinct qualities: aerobic capacity, muscular endurance under sustained load, eccentric leg strength for descent, and, for higher peaks, altitude adaptation.

Aerobic conditioning is the foundation. The lactate threshold, the exercise intensity at which lactate accumulation begins to rise, is a major determinant of how long a mountaineer can sustain submaximal effort on the climb. Lactate threshold is governed primarily by mitochondrial density in the trained muscles, not solely by cardiovascular fitness.

Eccentric loading on descent is a distinct preparation requirement. Eccentric muscle contractions cause greater muscle-fibre damage than concentric contractions at equivalent force, which explains why quadriceps soreness and weakness on the descent often exceed the load felt on the ascent. Controlled eccentric training in the weeks before a mountain day reduces subsequent damage through the repeated-bout effect.

When training combines strength and endurance work, the spacing of sessions matters. A 2012 meta-analysis found that concurrent strength and endurance training can interfere with both adaptations when sessions are stacked too close together, with adequate spacing preserving both qualities.

== Safety and hazards ==
Mountaineers face a variety of hazards. When climbing mountains, there are two types of hazards, objective (mountain-based) and subjective (human-based). Objective hazards relate to the environment, and may include inclement weather conditions, dangerous terrain, duration of exposure, and other environmental conditions. Subjective hazards relate to a climber's poor judgement, poor planning, lack of skills, faulty analysis and conclusions, or inadequate conditioning.

In terms of objective hazards, the dangers mountaineers face includes loose or falling rocks, falling ice, snow-avalanches, the climber falling, falls from ice slopes, falls down snow slopes, falls into crevasses, and the dangers from altitude and weather.

From 1947 to 2018, in the United States "2,799 people were reported to be involved in mountaineering accidents and 43% of these accidents resulted in death." Climbers themselves are responsible for nearly all climbing accidents.

When planning and preparing for a trip, safe climbers know what hazards to look for and how to recognize them. In situations where hazards are not able to be avoided, the climber must use their decision-making skills to mitigate those hazards. Climbers improve upon their ability to become a safe decision maker and recognize hazards by receiving proper education, training, practice, and experience as well as learning how to spot personal bias.

=== Altitude ===
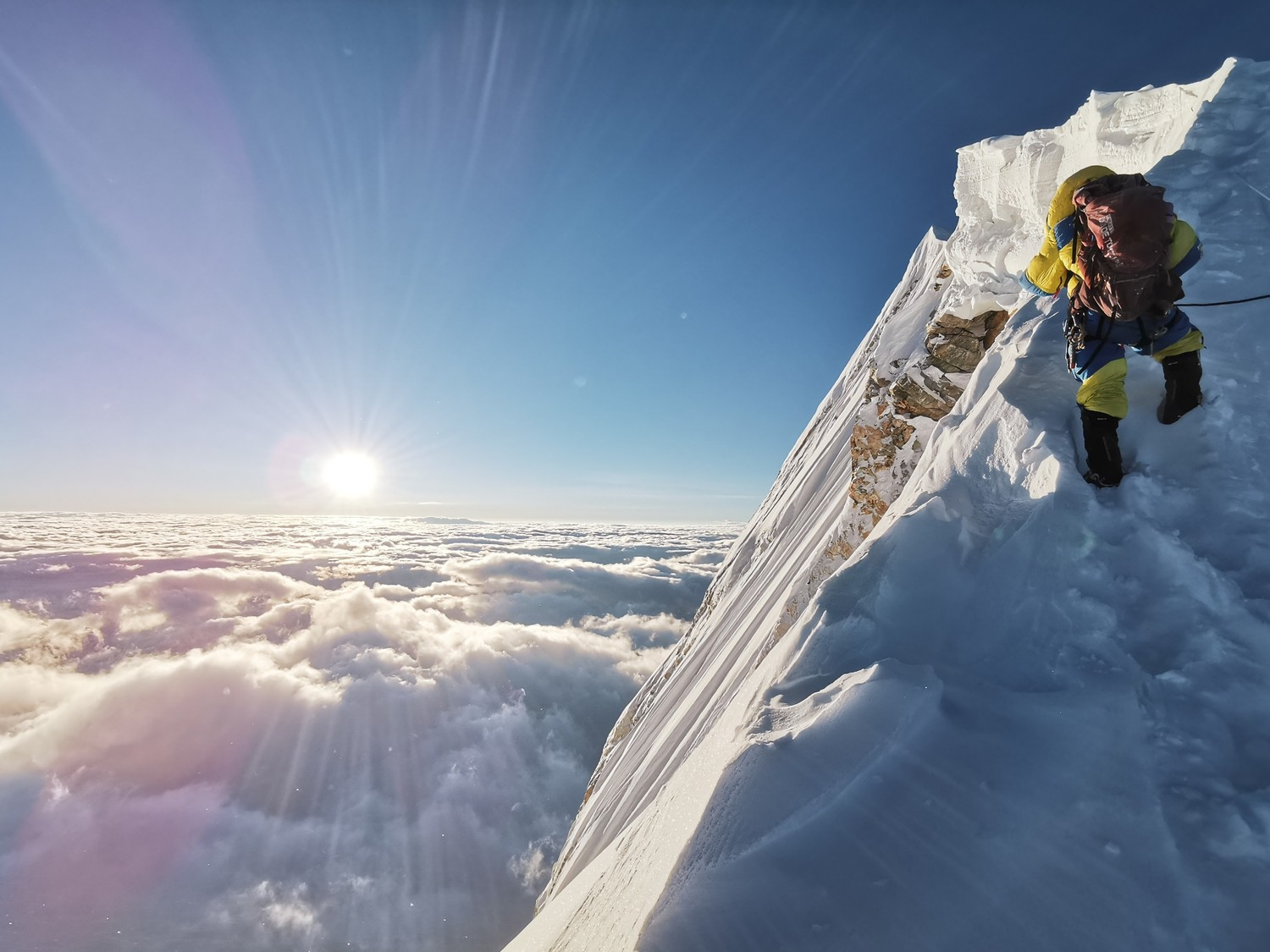
Climber approaching the summit of Manaslu at 8,163 metres

Rapid ascent can lead to altitude sickness. The best treatment is to descend immediately. The climber's motto at high altitude is "climb high, sleep low", referring to the regimen of climbing higher to acclimatise but returning to lower elevation to sleep. In the Andes, the chewing of coca leaves has been traditionally used to treat altitude sickness symptoms.

Common symptoms of altitude sickness include severe headache, sleep problems, nausea, lack of appetite, lethargy and body ache. Mountain sickness may progress to HACE (high-altitude cerebral edema) and HAPE (high-altitude pulmonary edema), both of which can be fatal within 24 hours.

In high mountains, atmospheric pressure is lower and this means that less oxygen is available to breathe. This is the underlying cause of altitude sickness. Everyone needs to acclimatise, even exceptional mountaineers that have been to high altitude before. Generally speaking, mountaineers start using bottled oxygen when they climb above 7,000 m. Exceptional mountaineers have climbed 8000-metre peaks (including Everest) without oxygen, almost always with a carefully planned program of acclimatisation.

=== Heat-related conditions ===
Exposure to hot environments or activities involving exertion cause heat to build up in the body. A heat-related illness can occur when the body is unable to lose that heat through the skin.

Problems that can arise from this type of exposure include heat cramps, heat exhaustion, and heat stroke. Common symptoms of heat exhaustion include headaches, cool and clammy skin, dizziness, fatigue, nausea, thirst, and rapid pulse. The best treatment is resting with feet elevated, replenishing fluids, and removing excess clothing.

Common symptoms of heat stroke can be an altered state of mind, rapid pulse and respiratory rate, headache, hot skin, loss of coordination, and possible seizures. This is a life-threatening illness that must be dealt with right away. While mountaineering, snow and ice can be used to cool the body and head.

=== Cold-related conditions ===
In certain environmental conditions body heat can be lost due to evaporation, radiation, convection, and conduction. A cold-related illness can occur when that body heat is lost.

Problems that can arise from the cold include wind chill, hypothermia, frost nip, frostbite, and immersion foot.

The best treatment for hypothermia is to deal with it before it occurs, using preventative measures instead of waiting for symptoms to appear. Mountaineering requires a slower pace to avoid sweating and fatigue that could lead to these dangerous conditions. Other tips for preventing hypothermia include staying well fed and hydrated, putting on more clothes when feeling cold, and wearing adequate equipment to keep warm and dry.

== Motivations and spirituality ==
Alpinism is often a spiritual and personal pursuit. Many climbers describe their experiences in the mountains as moments of transformation, transcendence, and profound meaning. The solitude of high altitude environments, the exposure to natural elements, and the life or death stakes can bring up existential questions.

Research in psychology supports these claims of transcendence. Elite mountaineers and base jumpers score highly in traits related to self transcendence, personality features associated with spirituality, mindfulness, and a search for meaning. Monisterio and Cloninger give three character traits associated with self transcendence: self directedness or a sense of purpose, cooperativeness meaning empathy and a sense of connectedness with others, and the capacity to feel part of something greater than oneself. These traits help explain why some individuals are drawn to high-risk, high-reward experiences like mountaineering.

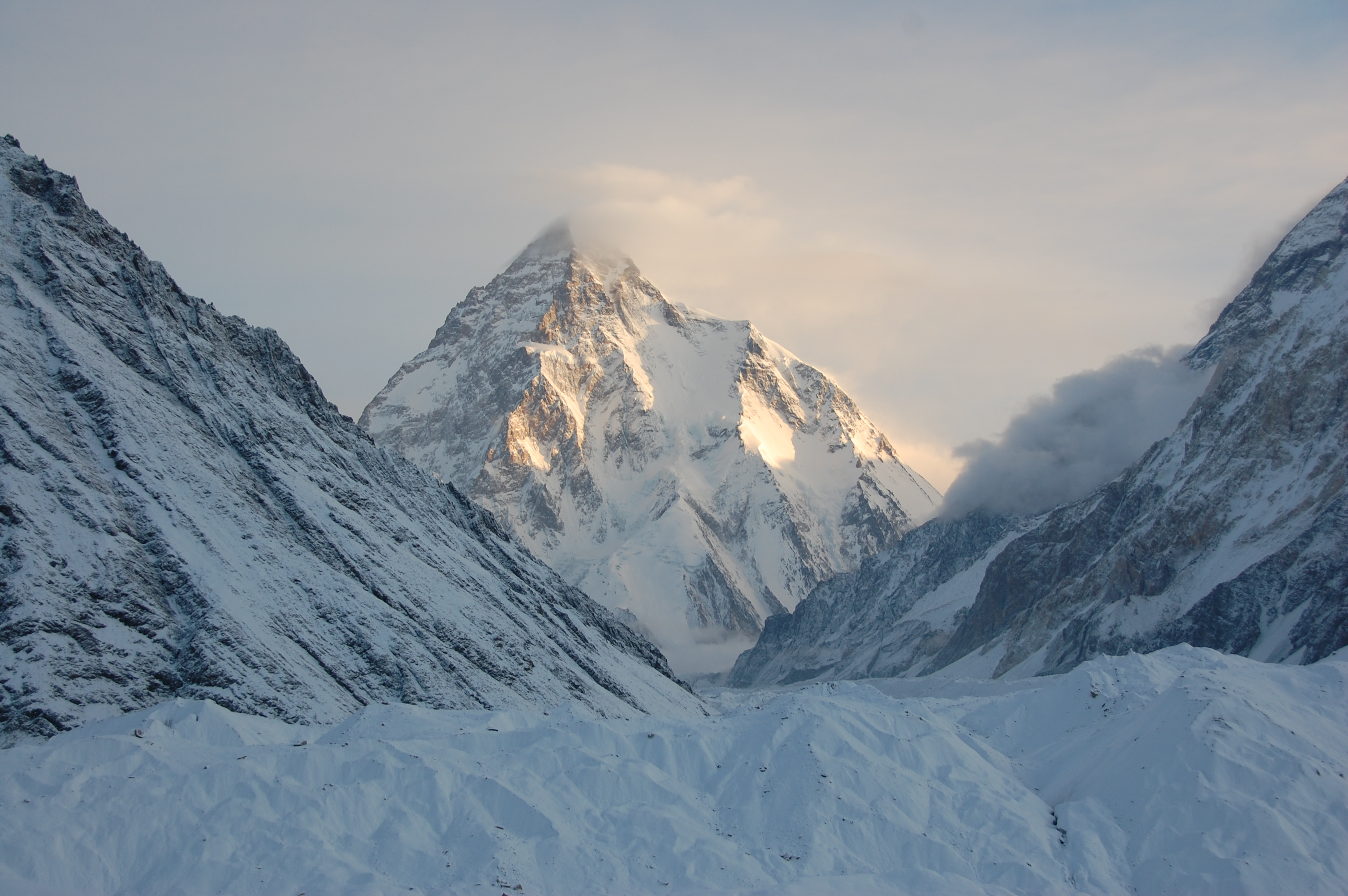
K2, the second highest mountain in the world

Personal calling is often also a motivation behind mountaineering. Climbers express that alpinism is a vocation and spiritually fulfilling. Earlier work has also revealed that climbers often experience spiritual growth, emotional release, and a stronger sense of self through their expeditions.

Much of this is due to the way mountains have long been regarded as sacred in numerous cultures, and seen as bridges between the earthly and the divine.

Flow states are commonly reported by climbers. These states are appealing because they provide psychological clarity and a sense of unity with the environment.

For instance, Marc-André Leclerc was known for his minimalist and solitary style, with many regarding him as a "pure spirit" of the climbing world. In interviews, he said that free solo climbing was meditative and he had a sense of harmony with the mountains. Alex Honnold, famous for his ropeless ascent of El Capitan, has been noted for his risk tolerance and mental discipline. Stephanie Denning framed his climbing as a form of mindfulness practice that challenges conventional understandings of fear and focus.

== Styles of mountaineering ==
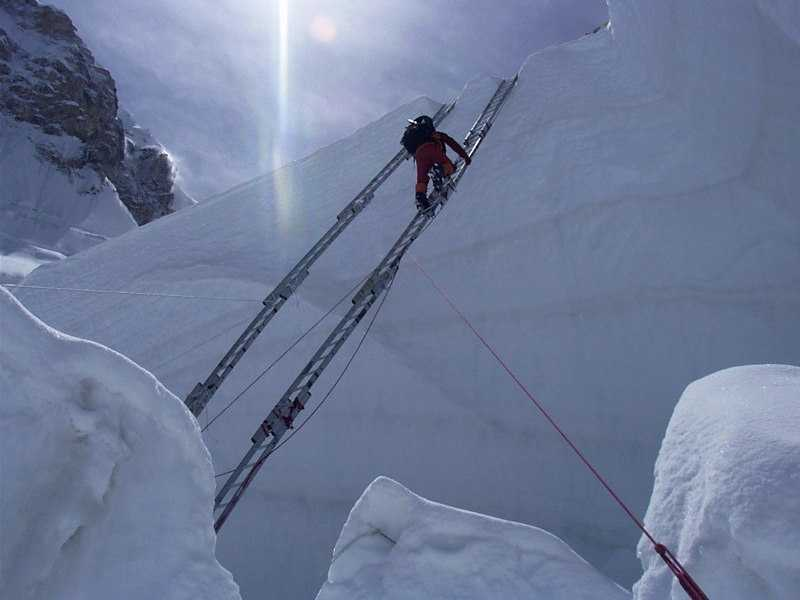
Fixed lines and ladders are distinguishing characteristics of expedition style mountaineering.

There are two main styles of mountaineering: expedition style and alpine style.

=== Expedition style ===
The alpine style contrasts with "expedition style". With the expedition style, climbers will carry large amounts of equipment and provisions up and down the mountain, slowly making upward progress. Climbing in an expedition style is preferred if the summit is very high or distant from civilization. Mountaineers who use this style are usually, but not always, part of a large team of climbers and support staff (such as porters and guides). To cover large distances with their massive amounts of gear, sleds and pack animals are commonly used. Climbers will set up multiple camps along the mountain, and will haul their gear up the mountain multiple times, returning to a lower camp after each haul until all the gear is at a higher camp; and repeating this procedure until they reach the summit. This technique is also helpful for acclimatization. While it is the original style in which high mountains were climbed, expedition style is rare these days as more mountains have become accessible to the general public with air travel and the penetration of highways into mountainous regions. It is still common in ranges such as the Alaska Range and the Himalayas.

- Uses multiple trips between camps to carry supplies up to higher camps
- Group sizes are often larger than alpine-style climbs because more supplies are carried between camps.
- Fixed rope lines are often used to minimize the danger involved in continually moving between camps.
- For the highest mountains, supplemental oxygen is frequently used.
- There is a higher margin of safety in relation to equipment, food, time, and ability to wait out storms at high camps.
- Avoidance of being trapped in storms at high altitudes and being forced to descend in treacherous avalanche conditions
- Possible higher exposure to objective hazards such as avalanches or rockfall, due to slower travel times between camps
- Higher capital expenditures and a longer time scale

=== Alpine style ===
Alpine style, or informal variations of it, is the most common form of mountaineering today. It involves a single, straightforward climb of the mountain, with no backtracking. This style is most suited for medium-sized mountain areas close to civilization with elevations of 2,000–5,000 m (6,600–16,400 ft), such as the Alps or the Rocky Mountains. Alpine style ascents have been done throughout history on extreme altitude (above 5,000 m) peaks also, albeit in lower volume to expedition style ascents. Climbers generally carry their loads between camps without backtracking, in a single push for the summit. If the summit is reachable from the base camp or trailhead within one day, then alpine-style mountaineers will not change camps at all, and only carry the slightest of loads (necessary nourishment and equipment) up to the summit. "Light and fast" is the mantra of the alpine mountaineer.

- Climbers climb the route only once, bringing their own supplies; there is no camp-stocking.
- Fewer supplies are used on the climb, therefore fewer personnel are needed.
- Rapid Alpine-style ascents do not leave the climber exposed to hazards (such as accidents, deteriorating health at altitude, and avalanches of snow or rock) as long as an expedition-style climb; however, they also leave less time for acclimatization.
- For the highest mountains, supplemental oxygen is rarely used, or used more sparingly.
- Danger of being trapped at high altitude due to storms, potentially being exposed to HAPE or HACE
- Lower capital expenditures and a shorter time scale

== See also ==
- Exploration of the High Alps
- Glossary of climbing terms
- Hazards in the Rocky Mountains
- Highest unclimbed mountain
- Index of climbing topics
- Lead climbing
- List of climbers and mountaineers
- List of deaths on eight-thousanders
- List of first ascents
- List of mountaineering disasters by death toll
- List of mountaineering equipment brands
- Mountain film
- Mountain rescue
- Mountaineering: The Freedom of the Hills
- National Outdoor Leadership School
- Peak bagging
- Piolet d'Or
- Ski mountaineering
- Snow goggles
- Snow Leopard award
- World altitude record (mountaineering)
- Alpine divorce
