= Lord William Cecil =

Lord William Cecil may refer to:

- Lord William Cecil (courtier) (1854–1943), British royal courtier
- Lord William Cecil (bishop) (1863–1936), Bishop of Exeter, 1916–1936

== See also ==
- Lord Cecil (disambiguation)
- William Cecil (disambiguation)
