= Lord Gascoyne-Cecil =

Lord Gascoyne-Cecil may refer to:

- Lord Edward Gascoyne-Cecil (1867–1918), British soldier and colonial administrator in Egypt
- Robert Gascoyne-Cecil, Baron Gascoyne-Cecil (born 1946), Conservative politician
- Lord William Gascoyne-Cecil (1863–1936), Bishop of Exeter

== See also ==
- Gascoyne-Cecil
- Lord Cecil (disambiguation)
