= Howard Priestman =

British mountaineer (1865-1931)

- Born: 22 December 1865; Bradford, UK
- Died: 7 December 1931 (aged 65)
- Occupations: Mountaineer, photographer, cartographer
- Known for: Mountaineering expeditions in Norway, photography, cartography

Howard Priestman (22 December 1865, Bradford – 7 December 1931) was a British mountaineer, photographer, and cartographer. He was among the most renowned mountaineers from the late 19th century to the early 20th century, known for numerous first ascents in areas such as Jotunheimen and Northern Norway.

Priestman participated in numerous expeditions in Norway alongside notable mountaineers such as William Cecil Slingsby, Harold Raeburn, Kristian Tandberg, George Wegner Paus, Geoffrey Hastings and Therese Bertheau. He was also a friend of Fridtjof Nansen. Aside from his mountaineering activities, Priestman was known for his extensive collection of photographs depicting the early history of Norwegian mountaineering in the late 19th century, as well as his systematic work in cartography, focusing on mapping the mountains. His collection of photographs has been made available by the Norwegian Mountain Museum and the Digital Museum in Norway. He became a member of the Alpine Club in 1893.

Priestman was the son of Edward Priestman and worked for the family's textile business, John Priestman & Co., which had been established by his grandfather John Priestman. He also developed an interest in scientific work related to the use of wool and later established his own consultancy in the textile industry. In 1914, he served as an advisor to the War Office on military clothing and became a technical consultant for the British Research Association.

== Publications ==
- Principles of worsted spinning, Longmans, Green, 1921, 321 pages
