= Starkad Ski Club =

Ski club in Norway

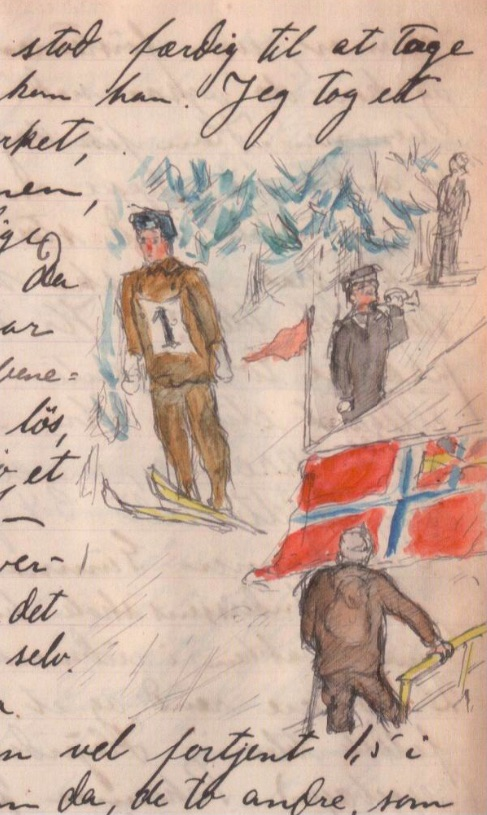
The journal Starkad, 1899.

Starkad Ski Club was a ski club and literary society during the early days of skiing in Norway. It was established in 1897 by "three hopeful youths around 15 years old," friends George Wegner Paus, Thomas Schram, and Thoralf Ridder. The club had a dual purpose: it was both a ski club and a promoter of "spiritual sport." The club is particularly remembered for its elaborate journal, titled Starkad, which was published between 1898 and 1903. It featured reports, interviews, poems, plays, and drawings from the early days of skiing in Norway, often with a humorous touch and high quality. The journal is considered an important source for the early history of skiing in Norway. Starkad's history is chronicled in the book Vinterlivets rene glæder (The Joy of Winter Life), named after a 1901 poem by George Paus published in Starkad. Several members became notable in Norwegian sports. George Paus was also known as a mountaineer. Thorvald Heyerdahl became "one of the most important Norwegian ski ambassadors abroad"; Oscar Hammerstad led the ski team at the first Winter Olympics in Chamonix in 1924.

== History ==
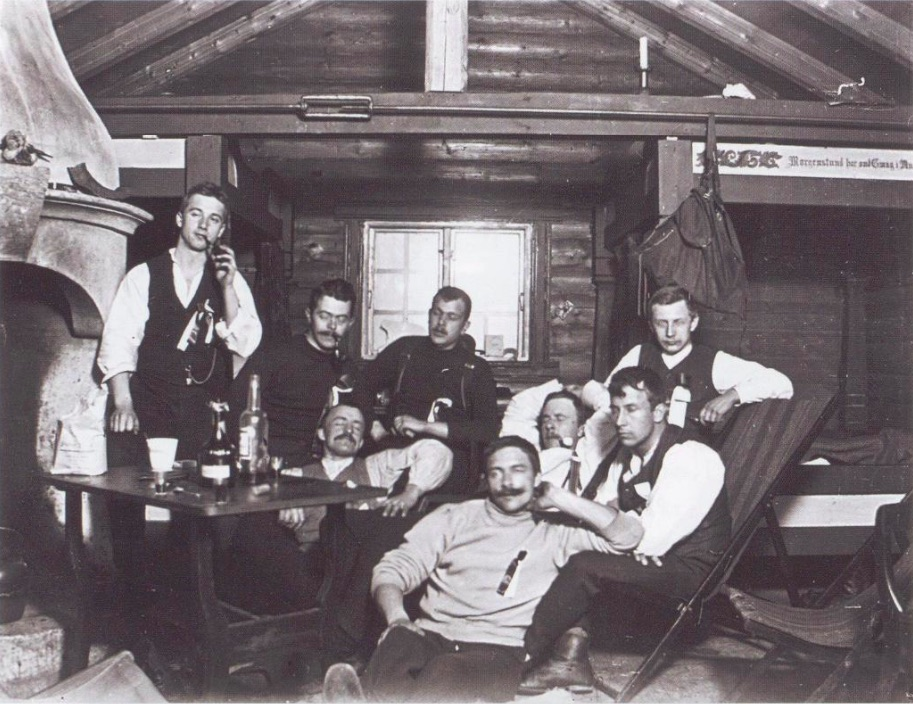
Starkad Ski Club, 1914

Starkad is "among the oldest ski clubs in the Oslo area and became part of a thriving ski community before 1900." The club emerged at a time when skiing, and the concepts of "sport" and "club," were new in Norway. It never became large, but it had historical and cultural significance for the development of skiing.

The founders were friends George Wegner Paus, Thomas Schram and Thoralf Ridder. Paus described the founding as follows:

On Sunday, November 14, 1897, three hopeful youths around 15 years old walked down the path from Øvre Frognersæter to Voksenkollen. The largest, Thoralf, distinguished himself by a strong rotundity in the posterior region; the second, Thomas, had large, round eyes and delightful chubby cheeks; the smallest, George, was a little fiery fellow with hands in his pockets and an upturned nose. They all chattered eagerly and gesticulated with arms and legs, discussing the great problem: the founding of a ski club

— Vinterlivets rene glæder

A few days after the founding, the club held a general assembly in the top floor of Paus's home at (Old) Nissen’s Girls’ School, and Alf Jørgensen, Bjarne Wold, Fredrik Parr, and Hans and Niels Hertzberg joined the association. George Paus was elected chairman and Thomas Schram vice chairman. The club was named "SIF." However, "some malicious individuals began to read the club's name backward [i.e. fis, meaning fart in Norwegian] and name the members accordingly," so the name was changed to Starkad, a somewhat ambiguous hero and poet from Norse mythology. In the fall of 1898, Robert Schirmer, Sigurd Orre, Thorvald Heyerdahl, Gunnar Frost, and Kristian Norby became members. Most of the members lived within 600 meters east of the Royal Palace. Thorvald Heyerdahl played a significant role in bringing skiing and Norwegian ski techniques to Europe through his participation in European sports events, becoming "one of the most important Norwegian ski ambassadors abroad." In 1900, the later well-known sports leader Oscar Hammerstad and lawyer brothers Enevold Falsen Schrøder and Johannes Schrøder joined; Hammerstad became secretary of the Norwegian Sports Federation, a colonel in the army, and led the ski team representing Norway at the first Winter Olympics in Chamonix in 1924. Eilert Sundt was also part of the club's milieu. George Wegner Paus's brother, surgeon Nikolai Nissen Paus, was also a member. In 1935, physician Lars Gram – both son-in-law of George Paus and nephew of Thomas Schram, two of the three founders – was admitted as a member.

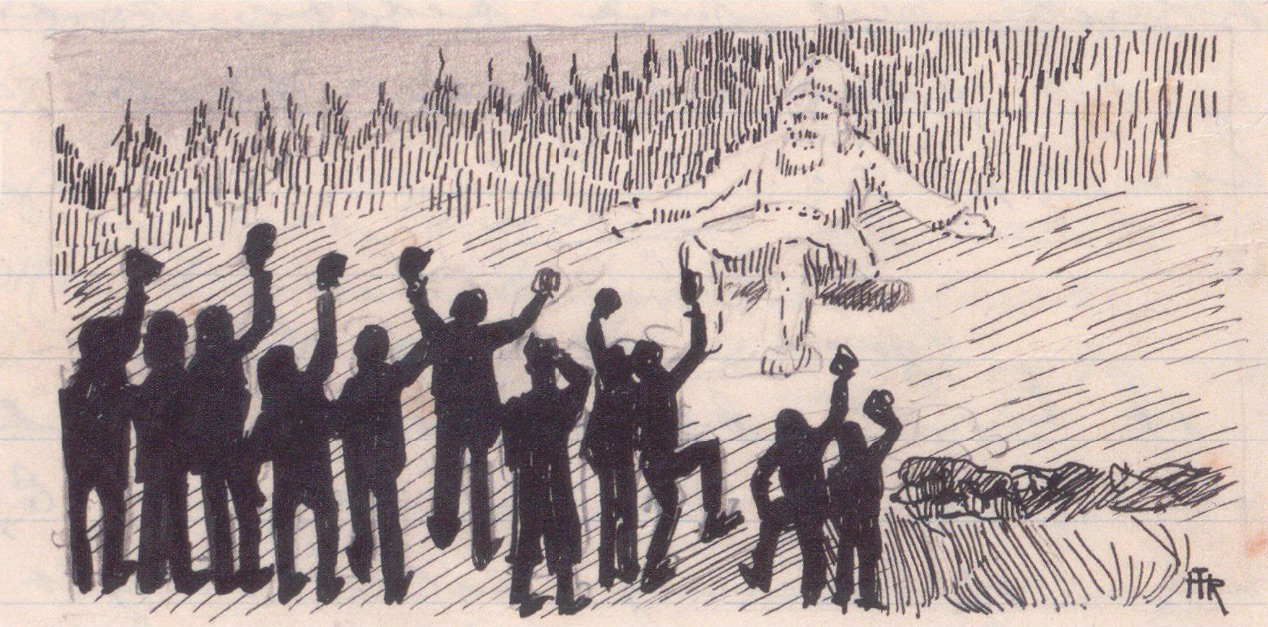
Starkad, 1902

Starkad was initially based at Grøttum in Sørkedalen. In 1903, the club purchased a plot at Risfjellkastet in Bærum and built its own cabin, Starkadhytta. During World War II, Starkadhytta was used by Milorg, the anti-Nazi resistance movement. Under andre verdenskrig ble Starkadhytta brukt av Milorg.

== The journal Starkad (1898–1903) ==
The magazine or newspaper Starkad (or Starkadavisen) fills three volumes and was published between 1898 and 1903. The magazine, a type of literary journal, contained reports, interviews, poems, plays (often with members in the roles), and drawings from sports events in Norway and the continent, as well as the social life around the club and its members, often of a humorous or romantic nature. Many texts and especially drawings by later architect Thoralf Ridder were of high quality, and the newspaper is regarded as an important historical source from the early days of skiing. The editors were elected at the general meeting, and the newspaper was regularly published as a handwritten and illustrated report circulated among members. For the five-year anniversary in 1902, the club published a commemorative booklet, Veslefandens jubileumsskrift, written by George Paus.

== Literature ==
- Jørgensen, Ivar (2012). Vinterlivets rene glæder : historien om skiklubben Starkad [The Joy of Winter Life: The History of the Starkad Ski Club]. ISBN 9788230320624.
