= Jotunheimen shoe =

Prehistoric artifact found in Norway

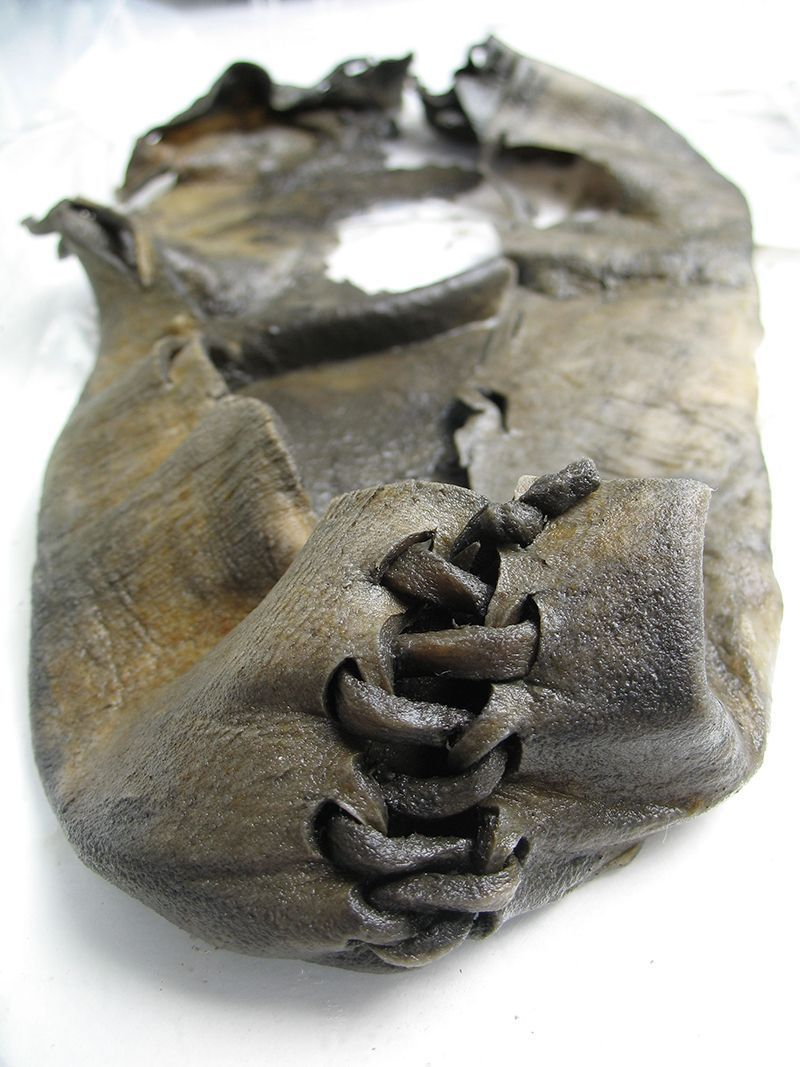
- Material: Leather
- Created: c. 1450 BC
- Discovered: 2006; Norway

The Jotunheimen shoe is a leather shoe discovered in an ice patch in the Jotunheimen Mountains in eastern Norway.

== Dating ==
The shoe, discovered in August 2006, was originally dated to around 1000 CE, but subsequent testing revealed it to be at least three thousand years old. Archaeologists now estimate that the shoe was made between 1800 and 1100 BCE, making it the oldest article of clothing discovered in Scandinavia.

== Related discoveries ==
It was discovered along with several arrows and a wooden spade, leading archaeologists to conclude that they had unearthed an important hunting ground that had seen continued use for a long period of time. One such object also discovered was a 6,100 year old arrowhead, the oldest object discovered in an ice patch in Norway.
