= William Cecil =

William Cecil may refer to:

- Lord William Cecil (courtier) (1854–1943), British royal courtier
- Lord William Cecil (bishop) (1863–1936), Bishop of Exeter, 1916–1936
- William Cecil, 1st Baron Burghley (1520–1598), English politician and advisor to Elizabeth I
- William Cecil, 2nd Earl of Exeter (1566–1640), Knight of the Garter
- William Cecil, 2nd Earl of Salisbury (1591–1668), Knight of the Garter
- William Cecil, 3rd Marquess of Exeter (1825–1895), member of the Privy Council of the United Kingdom
- William Cecil, 5th Marquess of Exeter (1876–1956), recipient of the Territorial Decoration
- William Cecil, 7th Marquess of Exeter (1909–1988), son of William Cecil, 5th Marquess of Exeter
- William Cecil, 17th Baron de Ros (1590–1618), Baron in the Peerage of England
- William Amherst Vanderbilt Cecil (1928–2017), operator of the Biltmore Estate
- William Cecil Ross (1911–1998), politician in Manitoba, Canada
- William Cecil Slingsby (1849–1929), English mountain climber and alpine explorer
