= Harold Raeburn =

Scottish mountaineer

Harold Andrew Raeburn (21 July 1865 – 21 December 1926) was a Scottish mountaineer. He was one of the most prominent British mountaineers of his era, with many first ascents in Scotland and elsewhere. In the late 19th and early 20th centuries he took part in numerous ascents in Norway, contributing to the popularization of Norwegian mountaineering among the international mountaineering community. Some of his regular mountaineering partners in Norway were William Cecil Slingsby, Howard Priestman and Norwegians Kristian Tandberg and George Paus. He was mountaineering leader on the initial 1921 British Mount Everest reconnaissance expedition.

== Life ==
Raeburn was born in 1865 at 12 Grange Loan, Edinburgh. His father William Raeburn, a brewer, had married Jessie Ramsay in 1849, and Harold Raeburn was their fourth son. He was educated at Merchiston Castle School and Heriot-Watt College, where he obtained a diploma in chemistry before joining his father's brewing business. He died in Edinburgh, on 21 December 1926, and was buried in Warriston Cemetery, Edinburgh.

== Mountaineering ==
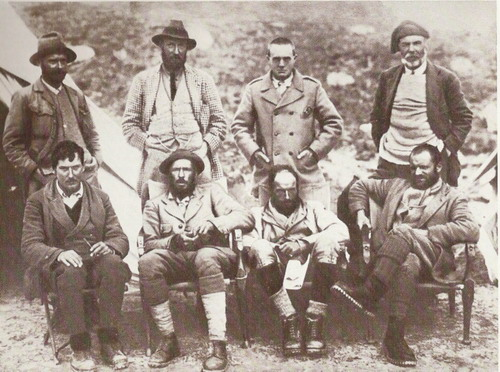
Everest Expedition 1921: Raeburn is standing on the right.

=== Scotland ===
In his book Mountaineering Art, Raeburn wrote: "I may mention that I learned skiing before knowing anything about mountaineering, in Norway, as far back as 1892, and traversed the same year several Scottish hills." It is not documented how or why Raeburn began climbing as a sport, but his early enthusiasm for ornithology led him to climb or descend many steep faces, in search of nests and eggs. A collection of eggs by him is kept in National Museum of Scotland, Edinburgh. Living under Edinburgh's Salisbury Crags and possessing a wiry, athletic build he soon adapted to the vertical world of rock and ice.

As to his character, he very obviously possessed the necessary determination and drive of any ambitious and hard mountaineer; Lord Mackay provided a good description of Raeburn, writing that he was "... physically and mentally hard as nails, trained by solitary sea-cliff climbing after birds' haunts, he was certain, unyielding and concise in every movement, both mental and physical." Mackay went on to remark that Raeburn had a capacity of grip that was astonishing: "He was possessed of strong muscular fingers that could press firmly and in a straight downward contact upon the very smallest hold."

Raeburn remained a bachelor all his life but he climbed with both men and women, including his sister Ruth (herself an expert climber), Jane Inglis Clark (a founder of the Ladies Scottish Climbing Club) and the Serbian mountaineer Natalia Yovitchitch. The Scottish Mountaineering Club (SMC, originally all-male) was founded in 1889 and Raeburn joined in 1896. Within a few years he became its leading climber, serving as Vice-President from 1909 to 1911 and later turning down the Presidency. He recorded many classic routes throughout Scotland: there are several "Raeburn's Gullies" scattered across the land.

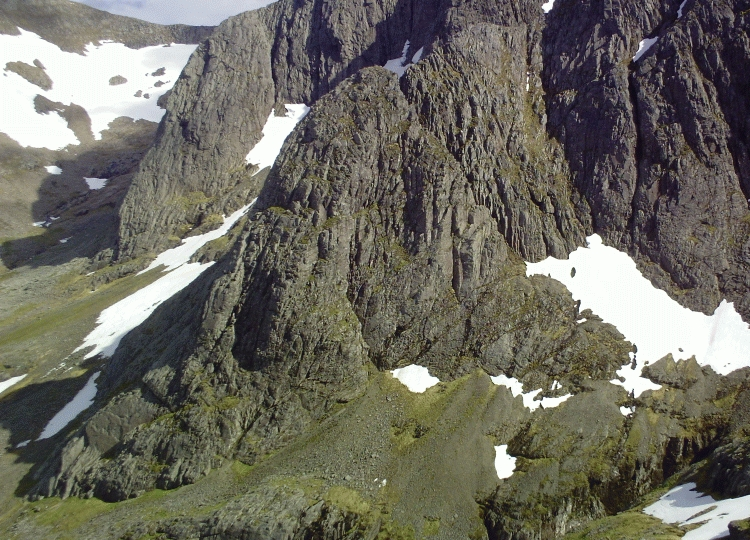
The west face of the Douglas Boulder below Ben Nevis, Highland Scotland. The left edge approximates to the line of Direct Route (215m Very Difficult) first climbed on 3 April 1896 by a party of four led by William Brown and including Raeburn – his first climb on Ben Nevis. The steep crest behind (left) is Raeburn's Arête (230m Severe), climbed on 30 June 1902 in the company of William and Jane Inglis Clark. The (almost) level Càrn Mor Dearg Arête is on the skyline.

==== First ascents ====
On Ben Nevis in particular, he left a tremendous legacy of fine routes; indeed, "of the 30 new routes on Nevis from 1896 to 1921, his name appears on exactly half." These include a solo first ascent of Observatory Ridge (V.Diff.) in June 1901; Observatory Buttress (V.Diff.) solo in June 1902; his outstanding eponymous Raeburn's Arête (Severe) two days later on North-East Buttress with William and Jane Inglis Clark; and the first winter ascent of Green Gully (IV,4) in 1906. The last-mentioned ascent, with a Swiss alpinist called Eberhard Phildius, was barely recognised in a later guidebook, as he had not climbed the rocks of The Comb on the left, but had instead followed snow and ice in the gully. Indeed, Raeburn's ascent was completely forgotten by 1937, when J. H. B. Bell made the second winter ascent, thinking it was the first. (Of Phildius himself little is known; he was almost certainly present in Fort William to meet another SMC member, the Rev. A. E. Robertson, as Phildius was involved in the Youth Christian Movement.)

In the Cuillin of Skye, Raeburn traversed much of the main ridge in winter conditions, including a crossing of the Thearlaich-Dubh, and he made the first ascent of An Caisteal’s formidable east face in a blizzard.

On Buachaille Etive Mòr in Glen Coe, Raeburn made the first three ascents of Crowberry Gully, including a wintry 1909 ascent, and the second ascent and first Scottish ascent of Crowberry Ridge Direct (1902), then the hardest rock climb in Scotland. His style of rock climbing was very muscular; he held himself close to the rock, while his particular attention to the exact times of ascents could frequently drive his companions to exasperation. There is a humorous reference to this: when one fellow SMC member climbed a new route left of Raeburn's Arête on Ben Nevis he called it "Newbigging’s 80-Minute Route", this being an echo of "Raeburn’s 18-Minute Route" climbed the previous year on the same buttress.

In Easter 1920, during the SMC Meet at Fort William, Raeburn made what was perhaps his finest winter ascent in Scotland – the first of Observatory Ridge on Ben Nevis. With fellow members Mounsey and Goggs, and using a 100-foot rope, the three finished the route in just under six hours, with one long ice axe each and no crampons.

=== Europe ===
From 1902 Raeburn climbed without guides, and he joined the Alpine Club in 1904. In the Alps he recorded fine climbs, including the first British guideless ascent of the Zmutt ridge of the Matterhorn in 1906, the ascent of the north face of Monte Disgrazia in 1910 with his friend Willie Ling, and the first solo traverse of the Meije, as well as first ascents in Norway and the Caucasus. He made two expeditions to the Caucasus, in 1913 and 1914. During the first his party made first ascents of five mountains, and attempted Ushba, being turned back by poor conditions. In 1914 four mountains were climbed, with Raeburn descending to learn that war had broken out.

=== World War I and after ===
Raeburn's book, Mountaineering Art was in manuscript when World War I began, and long, hard hours in an aeroplane factory for the next four years stopped all climbing. At 49, he was too old for the Royal Flying Corps. Following the end of the war, in 1919 Raeburn celebrated by returning to the Alps and making a solo traverse of the Meije ridges. His book was finally published in 1920, having been postponed because of the war. Also in 1920, Raeburn joined an expedition to Kanchenjunga, and he was mountaineering leader on the initial 1921 British Mount Everest reconnaissance expedition under the leadership of Colonel Charles Howard-Bury. He worked hard at organising and preparing the party while suffering from influenza. By the time the expedition reached Tibet dysentery had broken out. One member of the party died, and Raeburn himself had to be carried down, spending two months in hospital. With great determination he then re-joined the expedition, and from a high camp climbed a 21,000-foot peak before helping with the evacuation of the expedition’s stores and equipment. His health broke down irrecoverably in 1922, and he died four years later.

== Sailing ==
His other sport was sailing, and he raced yachts in the Firth of Forth. With his brother John, he raced as a member of the Royal Forth Yacht Club, based in Granton. They were successful enough to win the club's Corinthian Cup three times. Being presented with the Cup, they in turn presented it back to the RFYC, who renamed it the Raeburn Trophy. This is the name under which it is still competed for.

== Ornithology ==
Raeburn was a keen ornithologist. His diaries on the sea birds of the Shetland Islands and other species are lodged in the archives of the Department of Natural Sciences, National Museums Scotland. For some years these diaries could not be found, but a recent search unearthed them. He was the first to describe the birds on Lyra Skerry

== Commemoration ==
The SMC Raeburn Hut, between Dalwhinnie and Newtonmore, was opened in 1988 and is named after him. There is a faint geographical connection here, as Raeburn was the first to explore the steep cliffs on nearby Creag Dubh, Newtonmore.

Raeburn's ice axe is one of two seals of office held by the president of the SMC.
