= Therese Bertheau =

Norwegian mountain climber

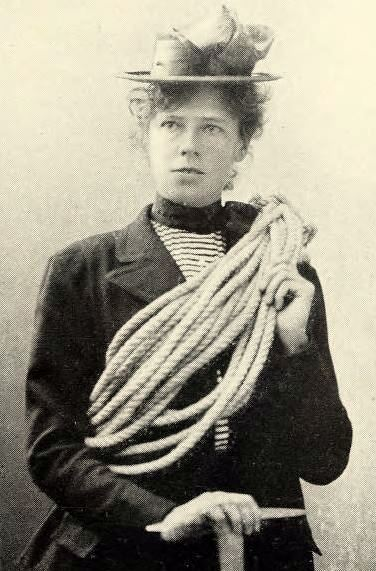
Therese Bertheau

Therese Bertheau (23 November 1861 – March 1936) was a pioneering female Norwegian mountaineer. She was among the first in modern times to introduce trousers as an everyday item of clothing for women.

Bertheau was born in Skjeberg in Østfold, Norway. She was the daughter of timber merchant Hermann Bertheau (1800-1864) and Borghild Bertheau (1820-1897). From 1879, she took a job as a language teacher at the Nissens Pigeskole which was a school for young girls. She taught the subjects of English and French.

She was an active mountaineer 1884 to 1910 and climbed over 30 peaks. She achieved many first ascents, as well as being the first woman on Store Skagastølstind (2405m) in 1894. In 1900 she was again on Store Skagastølstind accompanied by English mountain climber William Cecil Slingsby (1849-1929). In August 1901 she completed the first traverse over Styggedalstindane with well-known mountaineers Kristian Tandberg and George Wegner Paus. In 1904 she took the first known ascent of the walls at Kolsås with Norwegian mountain climber Henning H. Tønsberg. In 1902 she was elected as the first woman in the Norwegian Tourist Association Board, and in 1909 she was invited member of the Norwegian Alpine Club, which previously had not been open to women.
