= Kristian Tandberg =

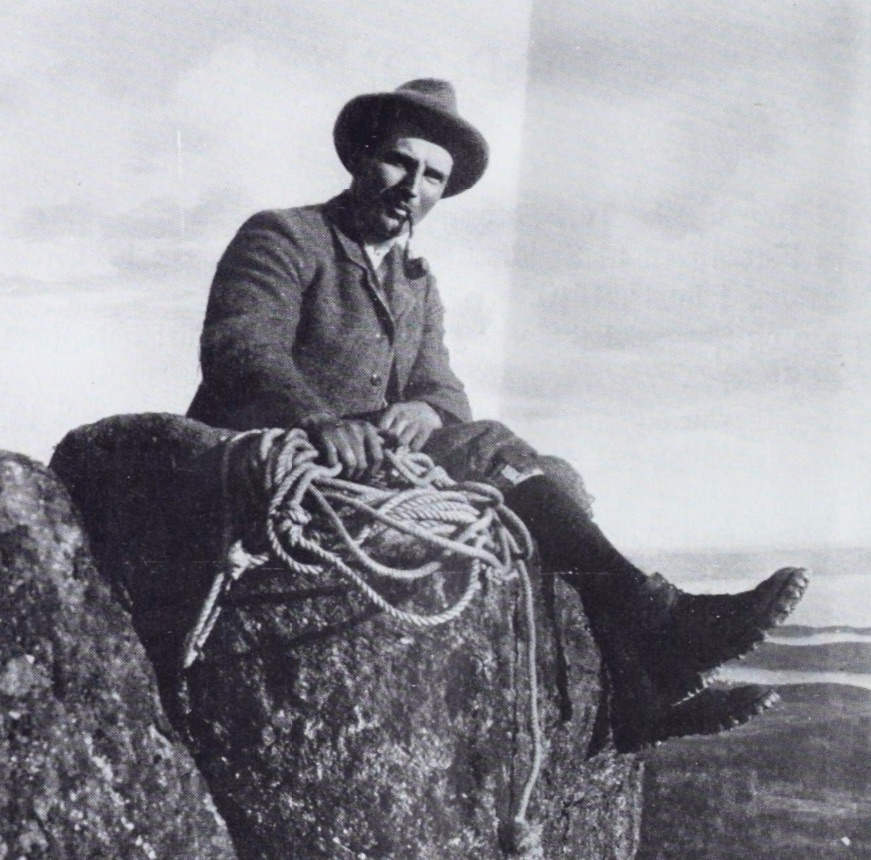
Kristian Tandberg

Johan Kristian Tandberg (born 22 June 1875 in Smøla, died 17 March 1911) was a Norwegian mountaineer, skiing pioneer, publisher and sports writer.

== Mountaineering ==
He was one of the first mountaineers in Norway with many first ascents in Jotunheimen, and participated in numerous expeditions with the most famous Norwegian and British mountaineers of his era, in particular British mountaineers William Cecil Slingsby, Harold Raeburn, and Howard Priestman, and his Norwegian friend, George Paus. He was also among the pioneers of skiing in Norway. The book Kristian Tandberg 1875–1911 was published the year after his death, with texts that emphasized his importance for Norwegian sports. William Cecil Slingsby wrote of Tandberg that "in every sport he took part he was the most skilful."

== Background ==
He was a co-owner of Grøndahl & Søn, one of Norway's leading publishing companies at the time. His sister was the genealogist Elisa Tandberg. His daughter Helen Tandberg married Severin Løvenskiold (b. 1908).
