= George Wegner Paus =

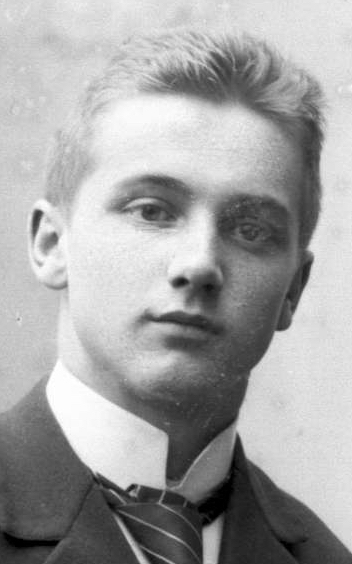
- Born: 14 October 1882; Christiania, Norway
- Died: 22 December 1923 (aged 41)
- Occupations: Lawyer, mountaineer, skiing pioneer, sailor, rower
- Parents: Bernhard Pauss (father); Henriette Wegner (mother)

George Wegner Paus (14 October 1882 – 22 December 1923), often known as George Paus, was a Norwegian lawyer, mountaineer, skiing pioneer, sailor, rower, poet, diplomat and business executive.

He practiced for a short period as a lawyer in Christiania in 1905 before serving for two years as a consular secretary and deputy head at the new Norwegian consulate in Chicago, being one of the first members of Norway's newly established foreign service. In 1907, he returned to Norway and became one of the first two employees and the first lawyer of the Norwegian Employers' Confederation, where he became director in 1918. He played an important role in labour issues in Norway and in the development of Norwegian labour law from the early 20th century, and participated in the establishment of the International Labour Organization in Washington, D.C., in 1919 as a representative of the Norwegian government. He also served on several governmental committees. He was a member of the Norwegian Association for Women's Rights.

He was one of Norway's most active mountaineers in the early 1900s with several first ascents in Jotunheimen; his regular mountaineering partners included his close friend Kristian Tandberg, pioneering female mountaineer Therese Bertheau whom he knew since childhood, and some of the most famous British mountaineers of the era including Harold Raeburn and Howard Priestman. He was also an avid sailor and rower who participated in national competitions. In the early 20th century he wrote poetry that often explored the connection between nature and human experiences. He was the founder and chairman of the ski club and literary society Starkad from 1897, described in the book Vinterlivets rene glæder (The Joy of Winter Life), named after one of his poems.

== Background ==
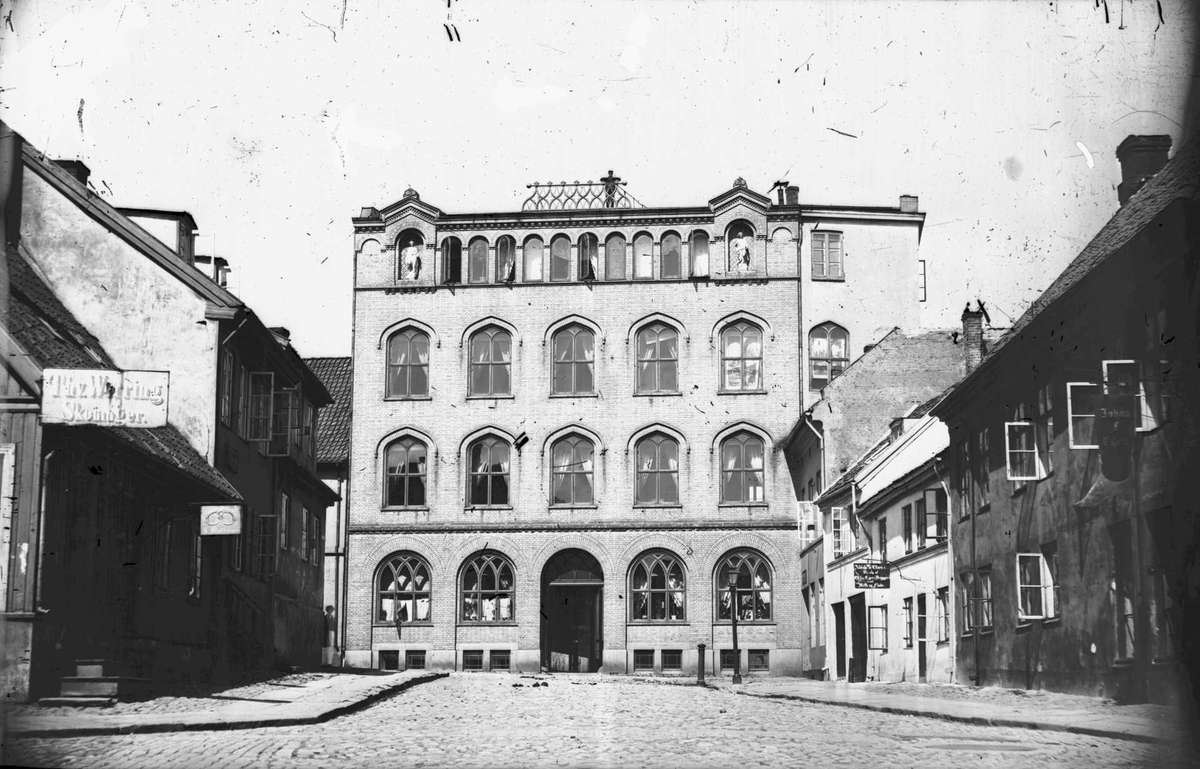
George Paus grew up in the top floor of Nissen's Girls' School, which his parents owned

George Wegner Paus belonged to the Paus family and was the youngest son of noted educators Bernhard Pauss and Henriette Pauss (née Wegner), who were influential pionéers in girls' and women's education in Norway. He grew up in the top floor of Nissen's Girls' School, which his parents owned and managed, and which was both the country's leading educational institution for girls and women, and a cornerstone of the emerging women's rights movement in his childhood. He was a grandson of the industrialist Benjamin Wegner and was named for his uncle, the lawyer George Wegner. His godfather was the statistician Anders Nicolai Kiær.

He married Ragna Løkke on 17 February 1906 in Chicago. They had a daughter, Eva Henriette Paus, who became a pediatrician and women's rights advocate. Like her father, Eva was involved with the Norwegian Association for Women's Rights.

== Legal and diplomatic career ==
George Wegner Paus obtained his cand.jur. degree from the Royal Frederick's University (now the University of Oslo) in 1904. He was admitted to the bar on 12 January 1905. Paus practiced law in Christiania until October 1905. From 1905 to 1907 he served as a consular secretary and deputy head of mission at the newly established Norwegian consulate in Chicago, becoming one of the earliest employees of the new Norwegian consular service shortly before the establishment of the Ministry of Foreign Affairs following the dissolution of the union between Norway and Sweden in 1905.

== Director of the Norwegian Employers' Confederation ==
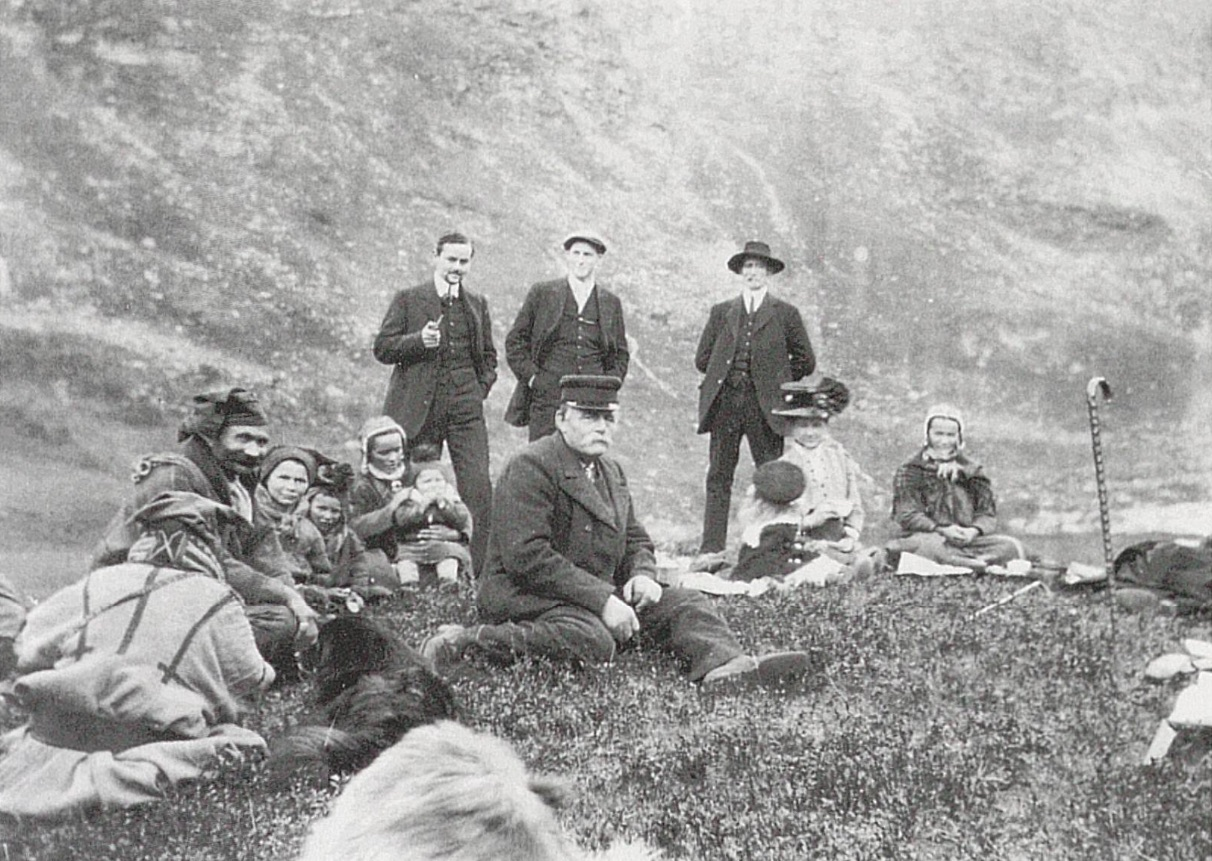
George Paus, standing to the left, in Birtavarre with a group of Sámi and the Birtavarre mining company's CEO in the 1910s. Paus was a board member of the company.

After two years in Chicago, Paus was employed as general counsel at the Norwegian Employers' Confederation in 1907, becoming its first lawyer and second management-level employee. In 1918 he became director of the organization. He was also involved in international employer organizations and was a key figure in labor-related legislative issues. He was a member of the Norwegian government delegation, led by Johan Castberg, at the Washington Conference in 1919, which established the International Labour Organization. Betzy Kjelsberg was also a member of the delegation. Both Paus and Kjelsberg were members of the Norwegian Association for Women's Rights. Paus also served on various committees and was a board member of the Birtavarre Mining Company in Northern Norway.

== Mountaineering, skiing, and rowing ==
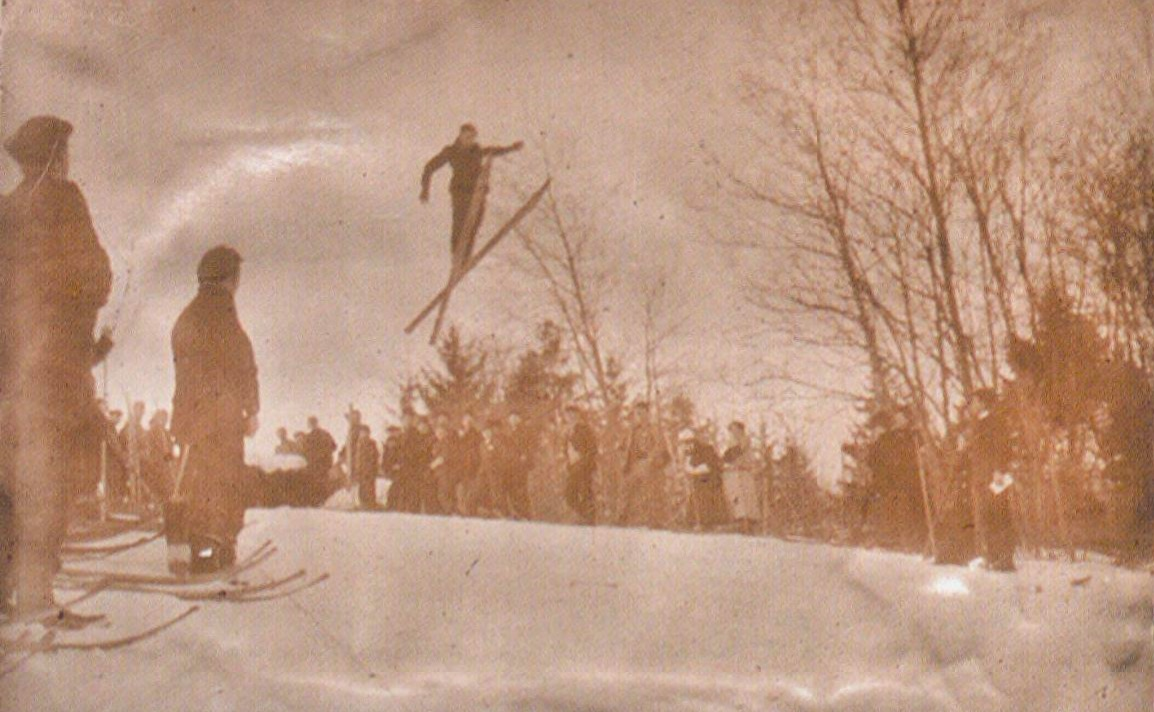
George Paus ski jumping in 1900

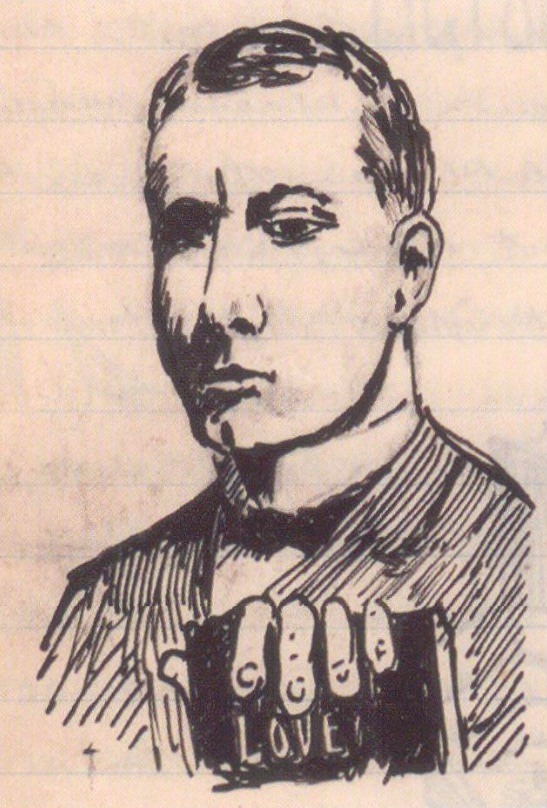
George Paus

When George Paus and Eilert Sundt, respectively 16 and 18 years old, arrived at Turtagrø in 1899, it marked the beginning of a new era for Norwegian mountaineering. [...] In the following years, numerous young mountaineering enthusiasts appeared at Turtagrø – the generation that would form the backbone of the mountaineering community in the coming decades, and who founded the Norwegian Alpine Club

— Jan Aaasgaard, Jotunheimen

George Wegner Paus was one of Norway's most active mountaineers in the early 1900s and a part of young generation of Norwegian mountaineers who formed the backbone of the mountaineering community from the turn of the century, and who founded the Norwegian Alpine Club. He had several first ascents, as described in the articles by his friend Kristian Tandberg in the yearbooks of the Norwegian Trekking Association. Paus climbed with Tandberg, Harold Raeburn, Howard Priestman, Therese Bertheau, Eilert Sundt, Kristian Lous, Henning Tønsberg, and other well-known mountaineers.

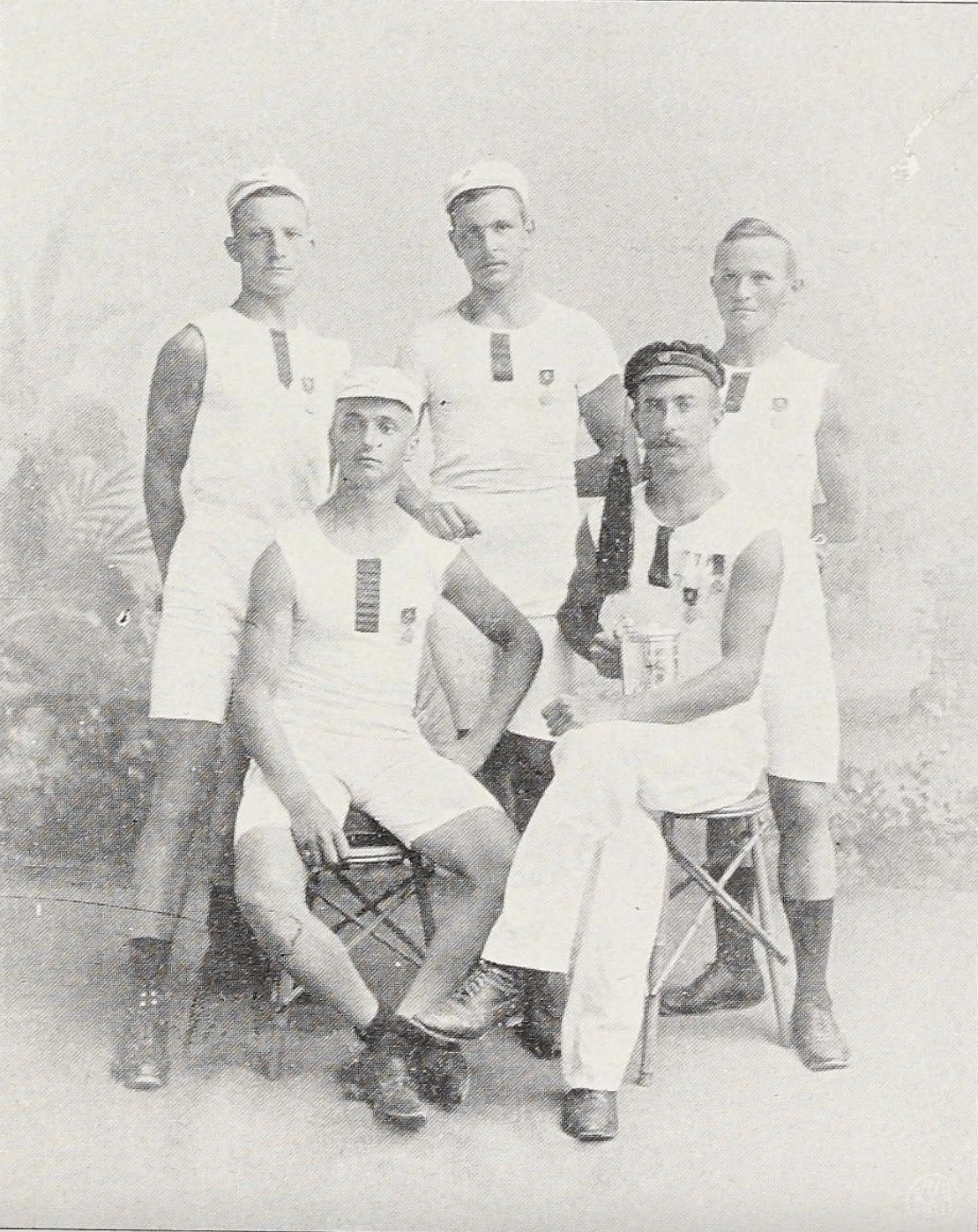
The winners of the 1902 Norwegian Championship in rowing. George Paus sits in front to the left

He co-founded the ski club Starkad in 1897 and served as its first chairman. He was also a prolific contributor to its journal Starkad, which chronicled the early history of skiing as a modern sport in Norway. The ski club and its journal were described in the book Vinterlivets rene glæder (The Joy of Winter Life).

He was also an active sailor and rower and participated in various competitions, winning the national championship in rowing in 1902.

== Poetry ==
George Paus wrote poetry that often explored the connection between nature and human experiences. Some of his poems were published in the journal Starkad and the book Vinterlivets rene glæder (The Joy of Winter Life), itself named after one of his poems.

== Death ==
When he became director of the Norwegian Employers' Confederation, he was already suffering from ill health, and concentrated on what was closest to his interests, labor law procedures and negotiations within the shipping industry. In the fall of 1920 he had to take leave; he died on Christmas 1923, only 41 years old. An article in Tidens Tegn stated that "gradually he had drawn too strong a draft on his strength, and a couple of years ago he had to seek leave. But the rest did not give him the restoration to health and strength that he had hoped for, and in the winter darkness just before Christmas he succumbed".
