= Lord Cecil =

Lord Cecil may refer to:

- Baron Cecil, a subsidiary title of the Marquess of Salisbury
- Lord David Cecil (1902–1986), English aristocrat, literary scholar, biographer and academic
- Lord Eustace Cecil (1834–1921), British Conservative Party politician
- Lord Richard Cecil (1948–1978), Old Etonian
- Robert Cecil, 1st Viscount Cecil of Chelwood (1864–1958), British lawyer, politician and diplomat, and winner of the 1937 Nobel Peace Prize
- Lord William Cecil (courtier) (1854–1943), British royal courtier
- Lord William Cecil (bishop) (1863–1936), Bishop of Exeter, 1916–1936
- William Cecil, 1st Baron Burghley or Lord Burghley (1520–1598), English statesman, the chief advisor of Queen Elizabeth I

== See also ==
- Lord Gascoyne-Cecil (disambiguation)
