= William Cecil Slingsby =

English mountain climber and alpine explorer

Cecil Slingsby
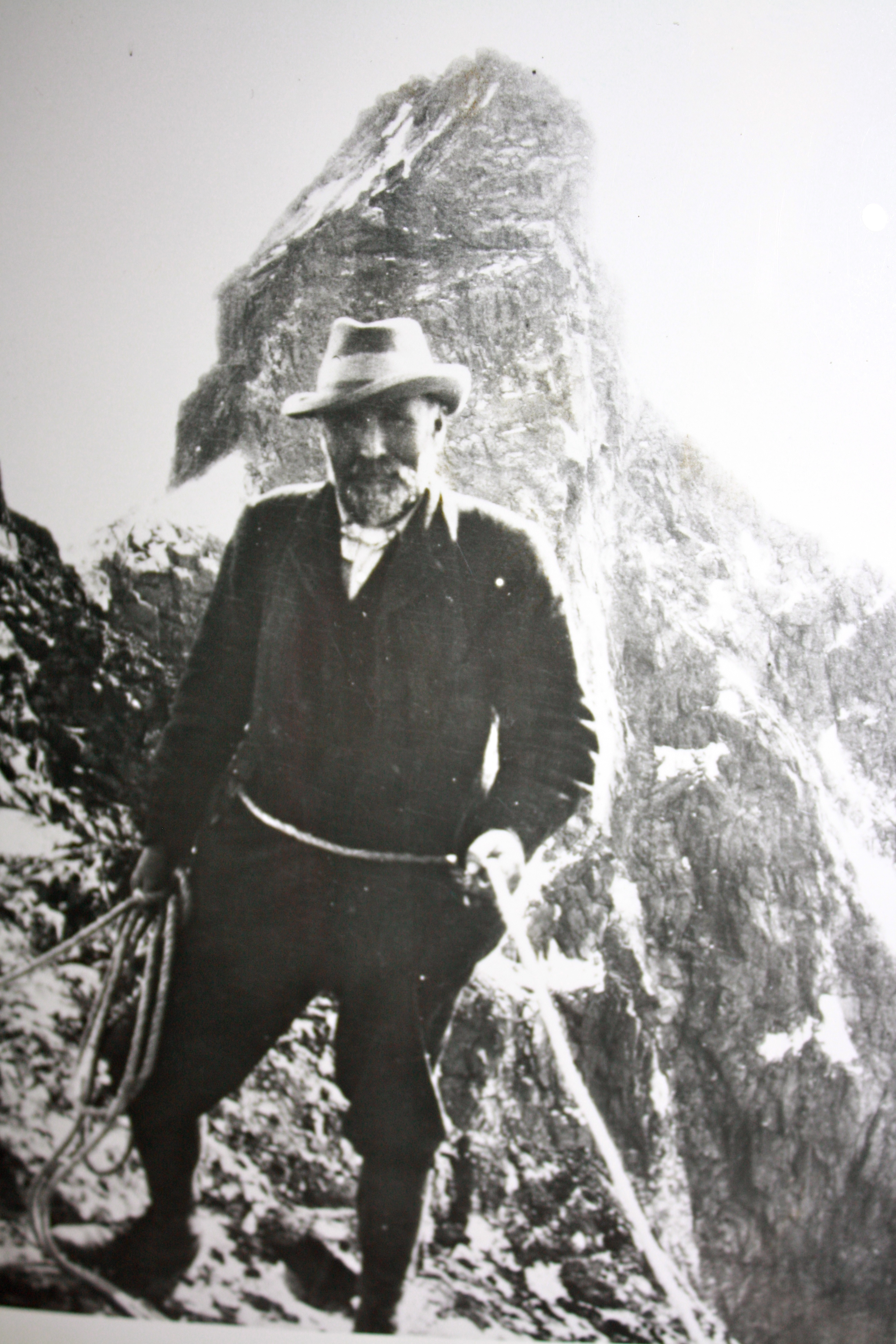
- William Cecil Slingsby near the top of "Storen"
- Born: 25 May 1849; Bell Busk
- Died: 23 August 1929 (aged 80); Hurstpierpoint
- Education: Cheltenham College
- Occupation: Mill owner
- Children: Eleanor Winthrop Young

William Cecil Slingsby (1849–1929) was an English mountain climber and alpine explorer born in Bell Busk, near Gargrave, Yorkshire. In 1863 his family moved to Carleton where they opened a cotton spinning and weaving mill which operated for about 60 years, Slingsby was directly involved in the running of the Carleton Mill and was a partner from 1897 until his retirement in 1909.

== Climbing in Norway ==
Slingsby first visited Norway in 1872 and fell in love with the country. He has been called the discoverer of the Norwegian mountains, and the father of Norwegian mountaineering (insofar as he seems to be the first who actively pursued climbing in Norway and was the first person on several mountains). Together with Norway's early skilled mountain climber Kristian Bing (1862–1935), he is considered to have been a pioneer explorer of Jostedalsbreen, the largest glacier in continental Europe. In 1874 he met the Norwegian Emanuel Mohn and a friendship developed between them, Mohn's vast local topographical knowledge of the Norwegian mountains and Slingsby's mountaineering experience led to an extensive mountaineering campaign together.

Slingsby made the first ascent of numerous peaks in Norway including "Storen", or Store Skagastølstind (7,890 feet (2,405 m)), the third highest peak in Norway, which he climbed in 1876. At the time, it was considered impossible to climb, but Slingsby defied popular notion and climbed the mountain, for the last part alone. Slingsby also attempted to climb the 1392 metres tall and highly steep Stetind in Narvik, but his attempt ended up as a failure, as he never made it to the peak. Slingsby would later describe this mountain as the ugliest one he had ever seen. His crossing of the 5,800-foot (1,800 m) Keiser Pass, Norway, on skis in 1880 also helped inspire the sport of ski mountaineering.

He also spoke and wrote strongly about several other mountains for example Slogen. His classic book on climbing in Norway, Norway, the Northern Playground, was first published in 1904 and republished in 1941. A new edition was released in 2003. The latest edition was published in March 2014. One of his regular mountaineering partners in Norway was Howard Priestman.

== Mountaineering in the Alps ==
Slingsby was part of the movement which promoted the practice of alpine mountaineering without guides and amongst his climbing partners were his relatives the Hopkinson brothers (Alfred, John, Charles and Edward), Albert F. Mummery, Geoffrey Hastings and Norman Collie. He made a number of significant ascents in the French and Swiss Alps; these included the first ascent of the Dent du Requin above the town of Chamonix, with Collie, Mummery and Hastings (regarded as a significant event in the history of Alpine climbing). The same party also made the first traverse of the Aiguille du Plan reaching the summit by the unclimbed Col des Deux Aigles in August 1893 (which has since rarely been ascended).

== Climbing in the UK ==
Slingsby's climbing in the UK was focused on the Lake District where he climbed with Haskett Smith, Charles Pilkington, Horace Walker, Edward Hopkinson and others. In 1892 he was in the party with Godfrey A. Solly, G. Philip Baker and William A. Brigg on 15 April 1892 when Solly led the first ascent of Eagle's Nest Direct on Great Gable, the first climb ever made which today ranks the grade of very severe and an ascent which "must rank as one of the outstanding feats of Lake District climbing history".

Slingsby was "in the vanguard of a turn-of-the-century shift in sensibilities in Britain with regard to women climbers". He climbed with some of the leading male mountaineers active in Britain at the time but he also liked climbing with women and often undertook difficult climbs with them, these not only included family members, Edith his sister, Alizon his wife and Eleanor his daughter but also some of the leading female mountaineers of the time such as Therese Bertheau and Lily Bristow. He actively encouraged female mountaineers and it was during his presidency of the Fell & Rock Climbing Club that women members were first allowed to attend the club's annual dinner (which was also a first for any British mountaineering club) and commented that was "as it ought to be".

Slingsby was an early member of the Yorkshire Ramblers' Club, and its president from 1893 to 1903. He was an honorary member of Norsk Tindeklub and of the Norwegian Trekking Association. He was made an Honorary member of the Fell & Rock Climbing Club when it was founded in 1907 and was elected as President for 1910-1912. He was also an active speleologist and became a Member of the Societe de la Speleologie in 1897.

Mumm's Alpine Register has a more comprehensive record of his activities from 1872 through to 1912 in Norway, the alps and the UK.

== Personal life ==
Slingsby's parents were William and Mary Ann (née Dewhurst) (1817-1886), his maternal grandfather was Isaac Dewhurst of Skipton (1791-1866) whose brother John Dewhurst (1787-1864) was the maternal grandfather of Alfred Hopkinson, Edward Hopkinson and John Hopkinson, the mountaineering brothers who also climbed in the Alps and the UK with Slingsby.

In 1882 Slingsby married Alizon Ecroyd (born 1859), the daughter of William Farrer Ecroyd and they had five children. The youngest son, Henry Laurence Slingsby (1893-1917) was killed in action in Belgium during WW1. Their eldest son, William Ecroyd Slingsby (born 1885), "the most unreliable and troublesome" of Slingsby's sons, climbed in the Alps with Geoffrey Winthrop Young in 1905, thirteen years before Cecil Slingsby's youngest daughter Eleanor Winthrop Young married Winthrop Young. Eleanor herself became a climber and a co-founder of the Pinnacle Club, a women's climbing association.

Slingsby died on 23 August 1929 in a nursing home at Hurstpierpoint, in East Sussex. He is buried in the churchyard at Carleton-in-Craven.

== Selected works ==
- W.C. Slingsby Norway: the Northern Playground, ISBN 1-904466-07-9
- Norway, the northern playground; sketches of climbing and mountain exploration in Norway between 1872 and 1903. Publisher: D. Douglas Edinburgh, 1904
