= Bernhard Pauss =

Norwegian theologian, educator, author and humanitarian

Bernhard Cathrinus Pauss
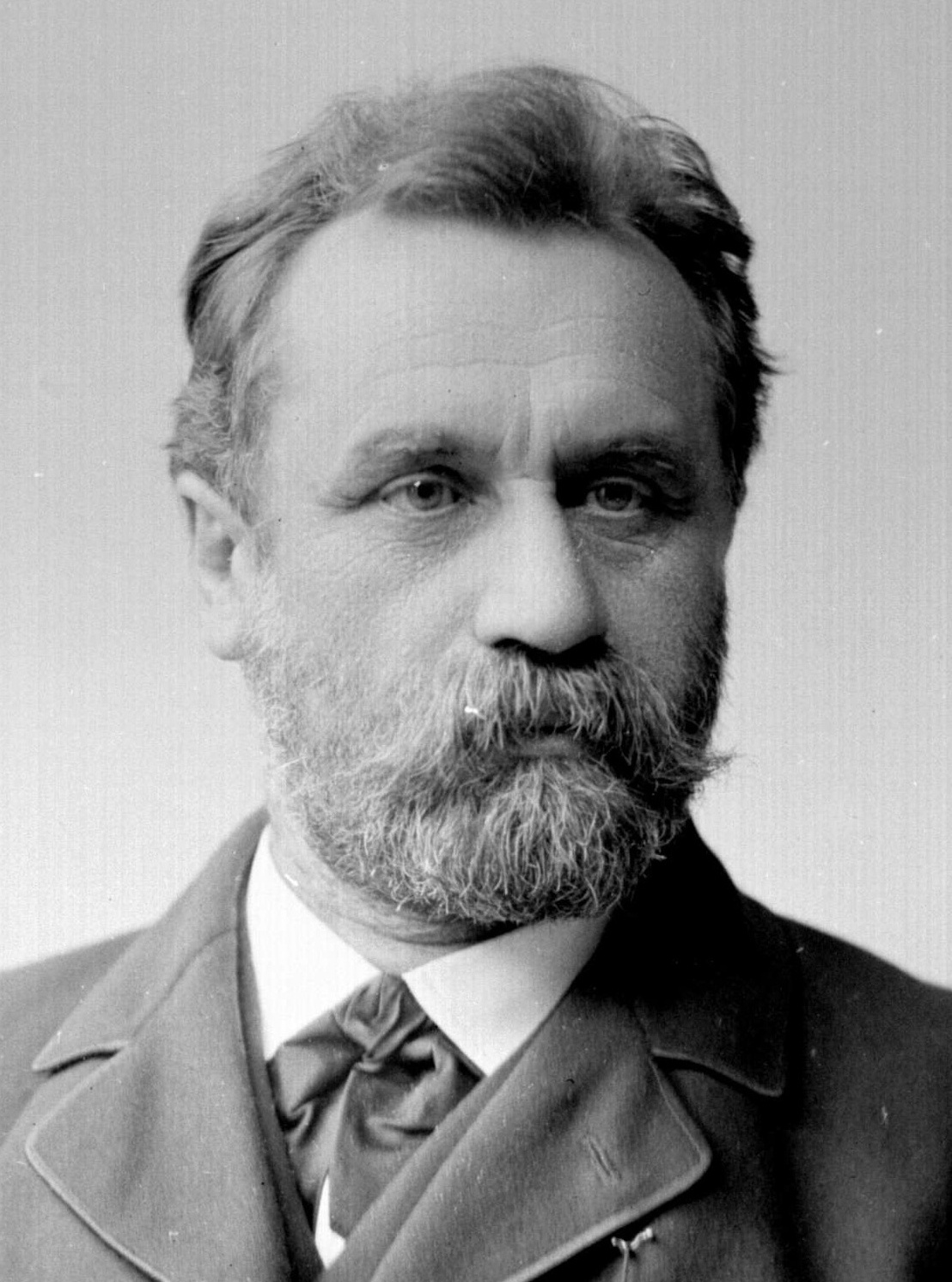
- B.C. Pauss, photographed by Gustav Borgen
- Born: 6 April 1839; Tangen, Drammen
- Died: 9 November 1907 (aged 68); Christiania
- Resting place: Vår Frelsers gravlund
- Known for: Theologian, educator, author and humanitarian and missionary leader
- Spouses: Augusta Thoresen; Anna Henriette Wegner
- Children: Nikolai Nissen Paus, Augustin Paus, George Wegner Paus, Henriette Wegner Paus, Karoline Louise Paus, Evald Pauss

Signature
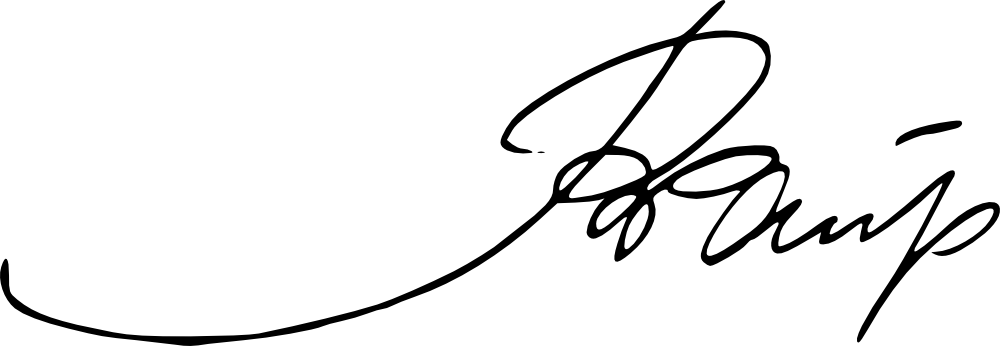

Bernhard Cathrinus Pauss (6 April 1839 – 9 November 1907) was a Norwegian theologian, educator, author, and missionary leader, known for his foundational role in advancing women's education in Norway.

He was headmaster and owner of Nissen's Girls' School, then the country's leading institution for women’s education. Under his leadership, the school became the first in Norway to offer middle school and gymnasium education for girls, and for years also housed the country's only institution of higher education open to women. He initiated key reforms that opened exams and academic pathways to female students, and the school became a centre of the emerging women's rights movement. He served on the government committee behind the Higher School Act of 1896.

Pauss combined his Lutheran faith with a socially engaged and reform-oriented outlook. He chaired the Norwegian Santal Mission (1887–1907) and founded and edited the journal Santalen. He also wrote and edited widely used schoolbooks in Norwegian and German, including Læsebog i Modersmaalet. He also taught at the Norwegian Military Academy (1868–1882) and served as vespers priest in Trinity Church and the Palace Chapel in Christiania. The village of Pauspur in India was named in his honor.

== Education and early career ==
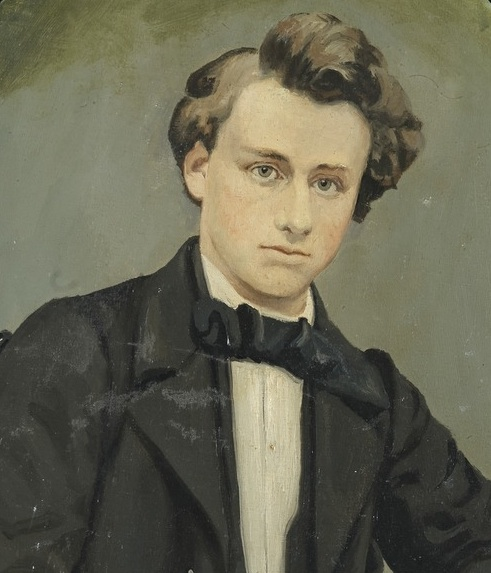
B.C. Pauss, portrait owned by Oslo Museum

He attended Drammen Latin School, where he was one of the first known members of the literary fraternity Silentium, and graduated with the examen artium university entrance exam in 1857. He then studied philosophy and theology (that is, Lutheran theology, the state religion of Norway) at the Royal Frederick University and obtained the cand.theol. degree in 1865. As a student, he worked as a teacher at Christiania Burgher School, a private middle school serving the affluent, from 1860. From 1862 he worked as a private tutor.

== Nissen's Girls' School and other schools ==
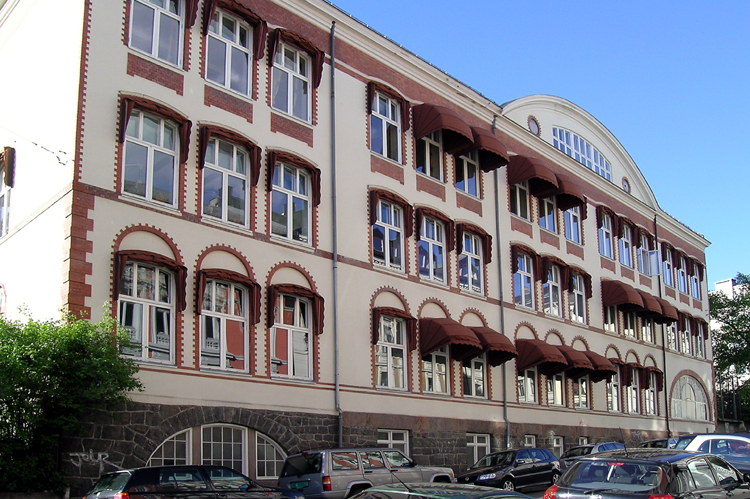
Nissen's Girls' School in Niels Juels gate 56 at Frogner, Oslo. The property was bought by Bernhard Pauss in 1897, who commissioned the construction of the building, which was completed in 1899

Upon graduating from the university in 1865, he became a teacher at Nissen's Girls' School, a private girls' school in Christiania. In 1872 he succeeded the school's founder Hartvig Nissen as one of three co-owners and joint headmasters, and he ultimately became the sole owner and headmaster. In 1903, the school was sold to the company that owned the neighbouring Frogner School, but Nissen's Girls' School was managed independently and he remained as headmaster until his death four years later.

During his time as headmaster, the school became the first in Norway to offer examen artium, the university entrance exam, for women. Nissen's Girls' School was also the first institution—ahead of the University—to provide tertiary education for women in Norway, through its affiliated teachers college, headed by Pauss. During the late 19th century, the college educated a significant proportion of all female teachers in the country. He bought the property where the school is now located in Niels Juels gate 56 in 1897 and commissioned the construction of the school's new building, designed by Henrik Nissen.

He lectured in German and religion at the Norwegian Military Academy from 1868 to 1882. He was also a member of the board of directors of the School for Young Ladies in Christian Augusts Gade.

He was described as a very kind man who was well liked by his pupils and staff. Former pupils erected a grave monument for him at Vår Frelsers gravlund.

From 1890, he was a member of the government-appointed committee which proposed the Higher School Act, adopted in 1896, and served in the sub-committee tasked with matters relating to girls' schools, with Ragna Nielsen and Henriette Wulfsberg.

== Books ==
Bernhard Pauss published numerous schoolbooks. Together with Hartvig Lassen, he edited the reading book series Læsebog i Modersmaalet (from 1884), which became one of the most widely used in Norway over a period of around 80 years. It was published eight years before Nordahl Rolfsen's Læsebog for Folkeskolen, and was more strongly characterized by the continuity from the Danish literary heritage, although it also featured the first contours of the Norwegian literary golden age.

== Chairman of the Norwegian Santal Mission ==
Bernhard Pauss was chairman of the Norwegian Santal Mission, a humanitarian and missionary organisation that was active among the Santhal people of India, from 1887 to 1907, in succession to Oscar Nissen. He was also the first editor of its journal, Santalen ("The Santal"), from 1883 to 1907. After his death, his wife Henriette Pauss succeeded him as editor of the journal and board member of the Norwegian Santal Mission.

A village in Assam, India, Pauspur (also spelled Pausspur), was named in his honour by missionaries of the Santal Mission. The village received this name in the late 19th century and still carried the name as of the 1950s.

== Personal life ==
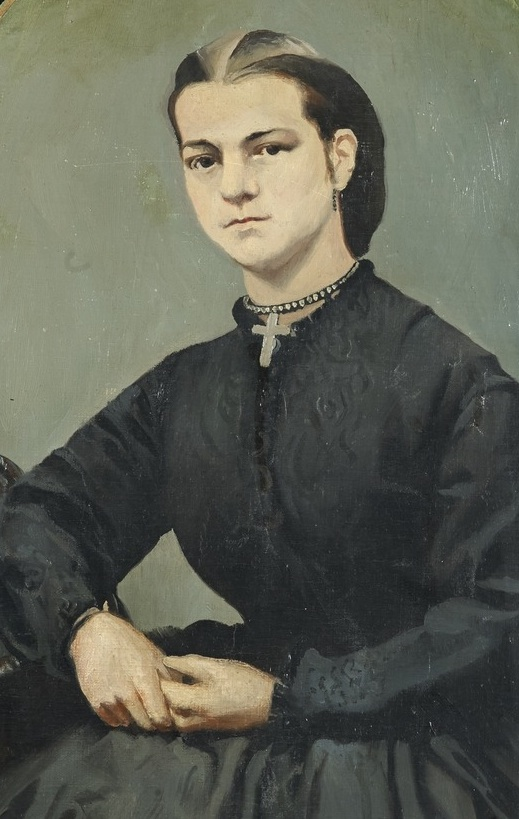
His second wife Anna Henriette Wegner (1841–1918), a daughter of the industrialist Benjamin Wegner

A member of the Paus family, he was a son of shipmaster and ship-owner from Drammen Nicolai Nissen Pauss (1811–1877) and Caroline Louise Salvesen (1812–1887), a daughter of the shipmaster and privateer Bent Salvesen and a granddaughter of the major Drammen timber merchant Jacob Fegth. He was of no relation to either Hartvig Nissen or Oscar Nissen, but was descended from district judge of Upper Telemark Hans Paus (1721–1774) and Danish-born Andrea Jaspara Nissen (1725–1772), a descendant of Nikolaj Nissen and whose family were estate owners in Jutland. He was a male-line descendant of the priests Peder Paus, Povel Paus and Hans Paus, and was also a descendant of the Danish war hero Jørgen Kaas.

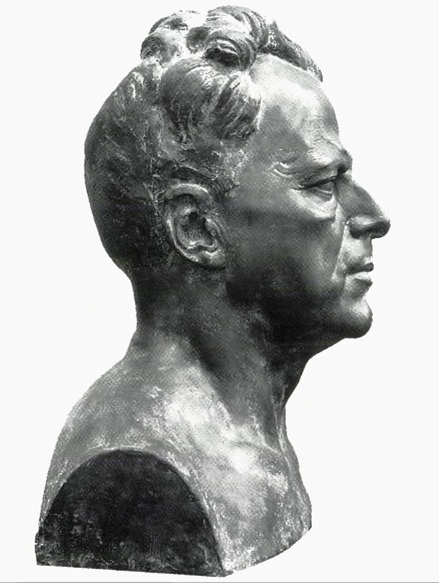
His son, surgeon, hospital director and President of the Norwegian Red Cross Nikolai Nissen Paus

In 1865, he married Augusta Thoresen in Geneva; she was a daughter of the Christiania timber merchant Hans Thoresen. Their only son Evald Pauss died as a medical student from diphtheria, a disease contracted as a student. Augusta died in 1875.

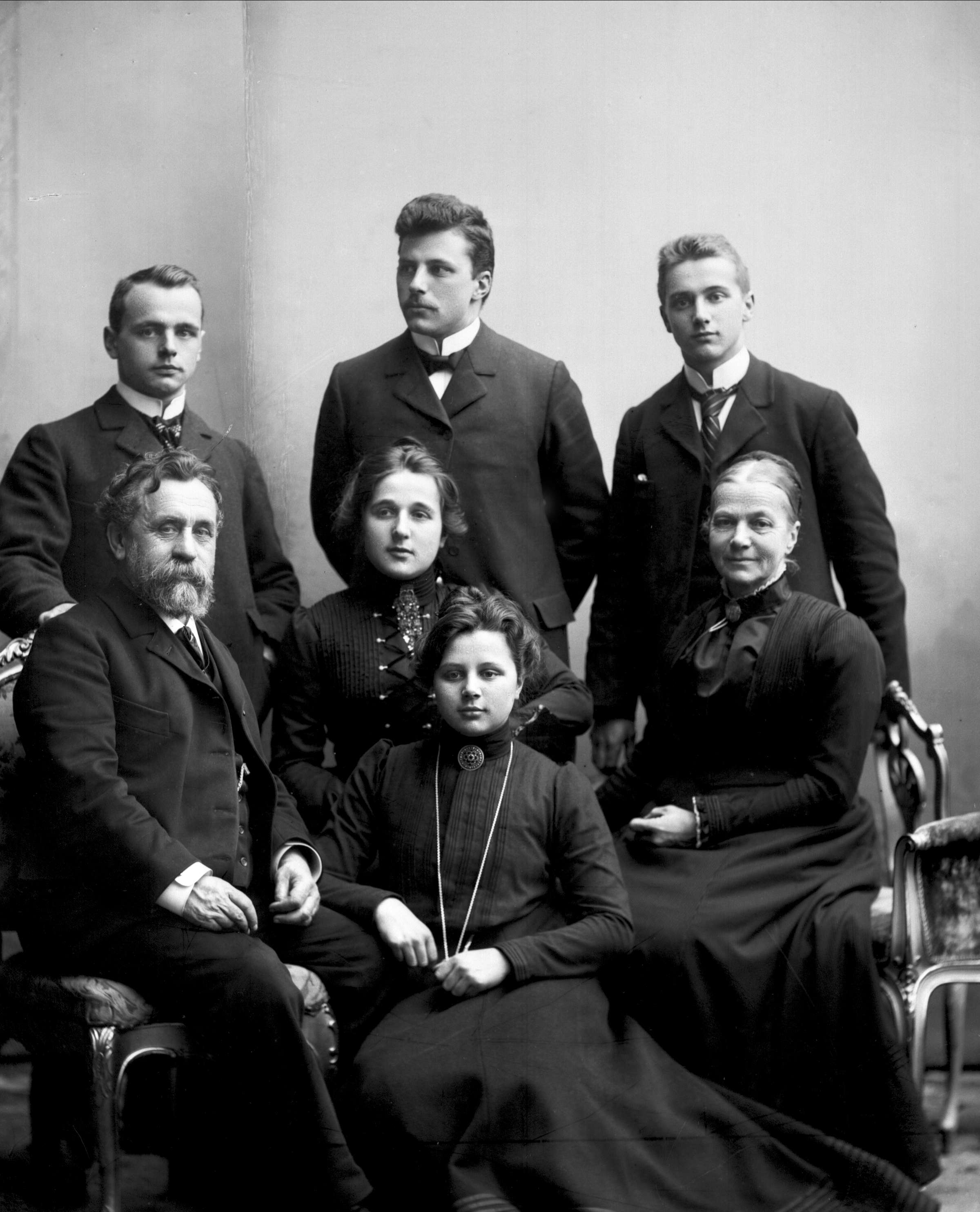
Bernhard Pauss with his second wife and their children, photographed by Gustav Borgen ca. 1900

In 1876, he married Anna Henriette Wegner (1841–1918) in Christiania; she was the youngest daughter of the industrialist Benjamin Wegner and Henriette Seyler, and a granddaughter of the prominent Hamburg banker L.E. Seyler, co-owner of Berenberg Bank. They were the parents of the surgeon, hospital director and President of the Norwegian Red Cross Nikolai Nissen Paus, the engineer and CEO of Akershus Energi Augustin Thoresen Paus and the lawyer and Director at the Norwegian Employers' Confederation George Wegner Paus, as well as the daughters Henriette Wegner Paus, married to private school owner (Frogner School, Nissen's Girls' School, Haagaas School) Theodor Haagaas, and Karoline Louise Paus, married to barrister Thorleif Ellestad.

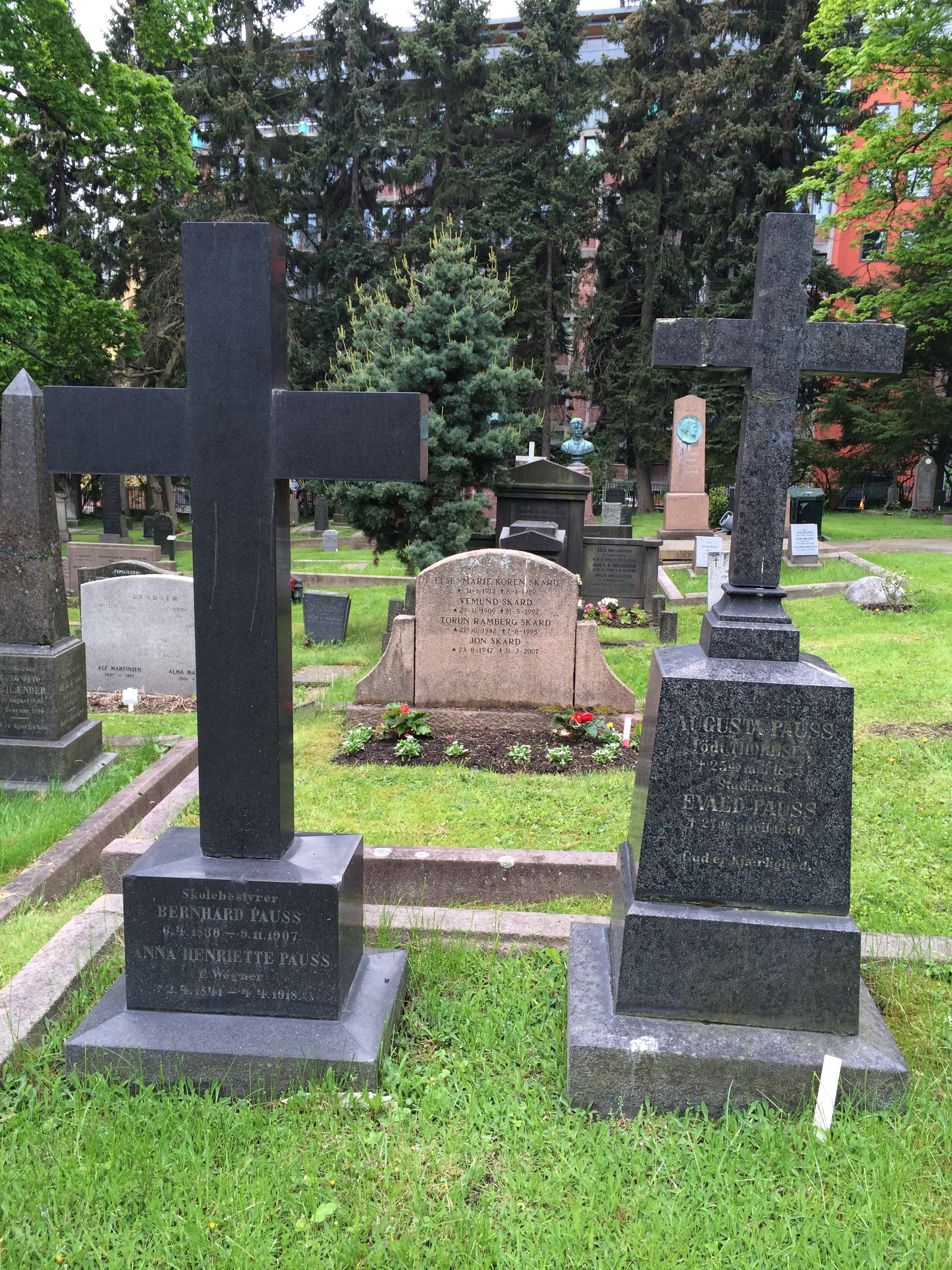
Grave of Bernhard Pauss, his two wives Augusta Pauss and Anna Henriette Pauss, and oldest son Evald Pauss, at Vår Frelsers gravlund

Bernhard Cathrinus Pauss was the grandfather of, among others, the surgeon, humanitarian and Grand Master of the Norwegian Order of Freemasons Bernhard Cathrinus Paus (1910–1999), of the industrial leader Bernhard Paus (1909–1970), of the diplomat and industrial leader Vilhelm Paus (1915–1995) and of the humanist Henriette Bie Lorentzen (1911–2001).

His second wife was a goddaughter of Countess Karen Wedel-Jarlsberg, Prime Minister Nicolai Johan Lohmann Krog, President of the Parliament Søren Anton Wilhelm Sørenssen, banker Johannes Thomassen Heftye, Prime Minister Frederik Stang, the King's aide-de-camp Hans Christian Rosen, Marie Schjøtt and Henriette Benedicte Løvenskiold.

He was the brother of ship-owner Ismar Mathias Pauss (born 1835) and Nicoline Louise Pauss, married to ship-owner, Member of Parliament and Norway's largest sail manufacturer Peter Hannibal Høeg. He was a godfather to his nephews Alf and Nicolay Nissen Paus, who founded the Paus & Paus industrial company.

In his lifetime, the family name was spelled Pauss, but his children reverted to the older spelling Paus, used by other family branches.

== Literature ==
- Einar Boyesen, "Bernhard Cathrinus Pauss," in Norsk biografisk leksikon, Vol. X, Aschehoug, 1949, p. 629
- "Bernhard Cathrinus Pauss," in J.B. Halvorsen, Norsk Forfatter-Lexikon 1814–1880, Vol. 4, 1896
- Einar Boyesen (ed.): Nissens pikeskole 1849–1924, Oslo 1924
- Nils A. Ytreberg: Nissen pikeskole 1849–1949, Oslo 1949
- Nissens Pigeskole og Privatseminar, Christiania, 1900
