= Henriette Pauss =

Norwegian teacher, editor, missionary, and humanitarian (1841–1918)

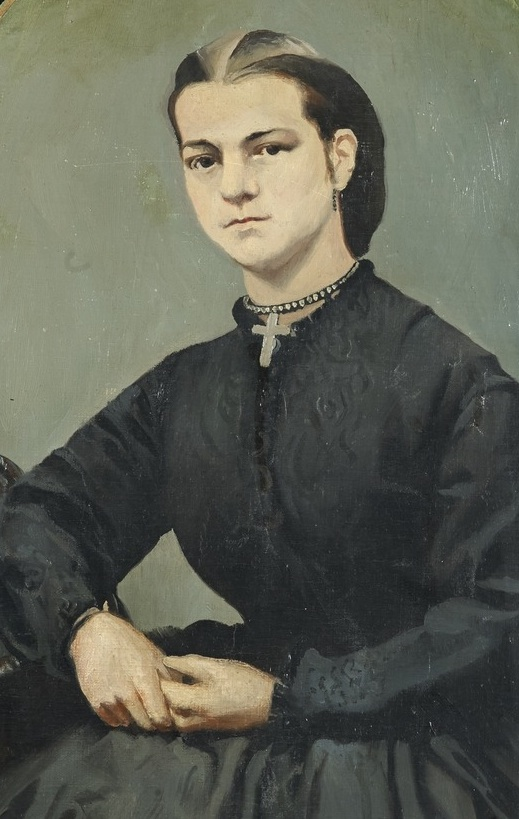
- Portrait owned by Oslo Museum
- Born: Anna Henriette Wegner; 2 April 1841; Frogner Manor, Aker
- Died: 4 April 1918 (aged 77); Christiania
- Resting place: Vår Frelsers gravlund
- Known for: Teacher, editor and humanitarian and missionary leader
- Spouse: Bernhard Pauss
- Children: Nikolai Nissen Paus, Augustin Paus, George Wegner Paus, Henriette Wegner Paus, Karoline Louise Paus
- Parents: Benjamin Wegner (father); Henriette Seyler (mother)

Anna Henriette "Jette" Pauss (2 April 1841 – 4 April 1918), née Anna Henriette Wegner, was a Norwegian teacher, editor, girls' education pioneer, estate owner, and humanitarian and missionary leader. With her husband Bernhard Pauss, she was a major figure in advancing girls' education in Norway in the 19th and early 20th centuries. She was editor-in-chief of Santalen from 1907 to 1912, the first woman to be editor of a nationwide publication that was not specifically focused on women's issues. (Note: Henriette Pauss had assisted her husband Bernhard Pauss in editing Santalen from its beginning in 1883 and, upon his death in 1907, took over as editor-in-chief, with Ivar Holsvik as editorial secretary. Thus, she became the first woman editor of a nationwide publication that was not specifically focused on women's issues. Her friend and close neighbor in her youth, Gina Krog, was the editor of the women's rights journal Nylænde from 1887. The women's magazine Urd was edited by Anna Bøe from 1897. Nanna With became the first woman newspaper editor in 1905, at the local paper Vesteraalens Avis.)

She was born at Frogner Manor and was the youngest daughter of the mining and timber magnate Benjamin Wegner and the banking heir, philanthropist and early women's rights pioneer Henriette Seyler, who was a co-owner of her family's bank, Berenberg Bank. Her parents moved to Norway in the early 1820s when her father became managing director and co-owner of Blaafarveværket, the country's largest mining company and industrial enterprise. She was a goddaughter of Countess Karen Wedel-Jarlsberg and Prime Minister Frederik Stang. Her grandfather was the Hamburg banker and politician Ludwig Erdwin Seyler and her great-grandfather was the theatre director Abel Seyler.

In the 1860s she became a teacher at Nissen's Girls' School, Norway's preeminent educational institution for girls and women. In 1876 she married the school's owner and headmaster Bernhard Pauss, a member of the noted Paus family. She served as the school's headmistress from 1885 to 1909. They established, among other things, Norway's first girls' gymnasium or high school. She was extensively involved in other schools and organizations. She was one of the key leaders of the Norwegian Santal Mission that ran schools, hospitals and social projects in India; she was the first woman to be a national board member of a major Christian organization in Norway. With two of her siblings she was one of the owners of Hafslund Manor, a 340,000 decare estate. She and the other owners sold Hafslund in 1894 to the consortium that became the beginning of the energy company Hafslund.

She was the mother of the surgeon and President of the Norwegian Red Cross Nikolai Nissen Paus, of the industrial leader Augustin Paus and of the lawyer, mountaineer and business executive George Wegner Paus.

== Background ==
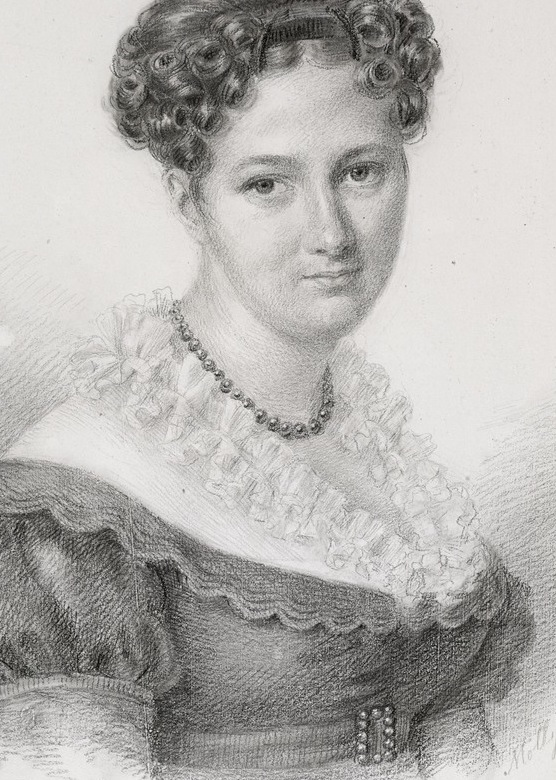
Her mother Henriette Wegner (née Seyler) was a co-owner of Berenberg Bank and a granddaughter of the theatre director Abel Seyler

She was born at Frogner Manor and was the youngest daughter of the mining magnate Benjamin Wegner and the philanthropist Henriette Wegner (née Seyler). Her parents moved to Norway from Germany in the early 1820s; her father was a co-owner and managing director of Blaafarveværket, owner of Frogner Manor and co-owner of Hassel Iron Works, Hafslund Manor and the timber company of Juel, Wegner & Co. Her grandparents were the Hamburg banker L.E. Seyler and Anna Henriette Gossler, for whom she was named. Her mother was a co-owner of her family's bank, Berenberg Bank, and a granddaughter of the Swiss theatre director Abel Seyler.

She was a goddaughter of Countess Karen Wedel-Jarlsberg, Prime Minister Nicolai Johan Lohmann Krog, President of the Parliament Søren Anton Wilhelm Sørenssen, banker Johannes Thomassen Heftye, Prime Minister Frederik Stang, the King's aide-de-camp Hans Christian Rosen, Marie Schjøtt and Henriette Benedicte Løvenskiold. In 1864, her family sold Frognerseteren to her godbrother Thomas Johannessen Heftye.

Together with her sister and her brother George Wegner, she was from 1875 to 1894 one of the main owners of Hafslund Manor, which included sawmills, timber export, around 340,000 decares of forest in Østfold and Østerdalen, and a large number of tenant farms; she and her co-owners sold Hafslund in 1894 to the consortium that marked the beginning of the energy company Hafslund.

In 1876 she married Bernhard Pauss, the headmaster and co-owner of Nissen's Girls' School. They had five children: the surgeon Nikolai Nissen Paus, the lawyer George Wegner Paus and the hydropower executive Augustin Paus, and the daughters Henriette and Louise. She is interred at Vår Frelsers gravlund.

== Teaching career and public service ==
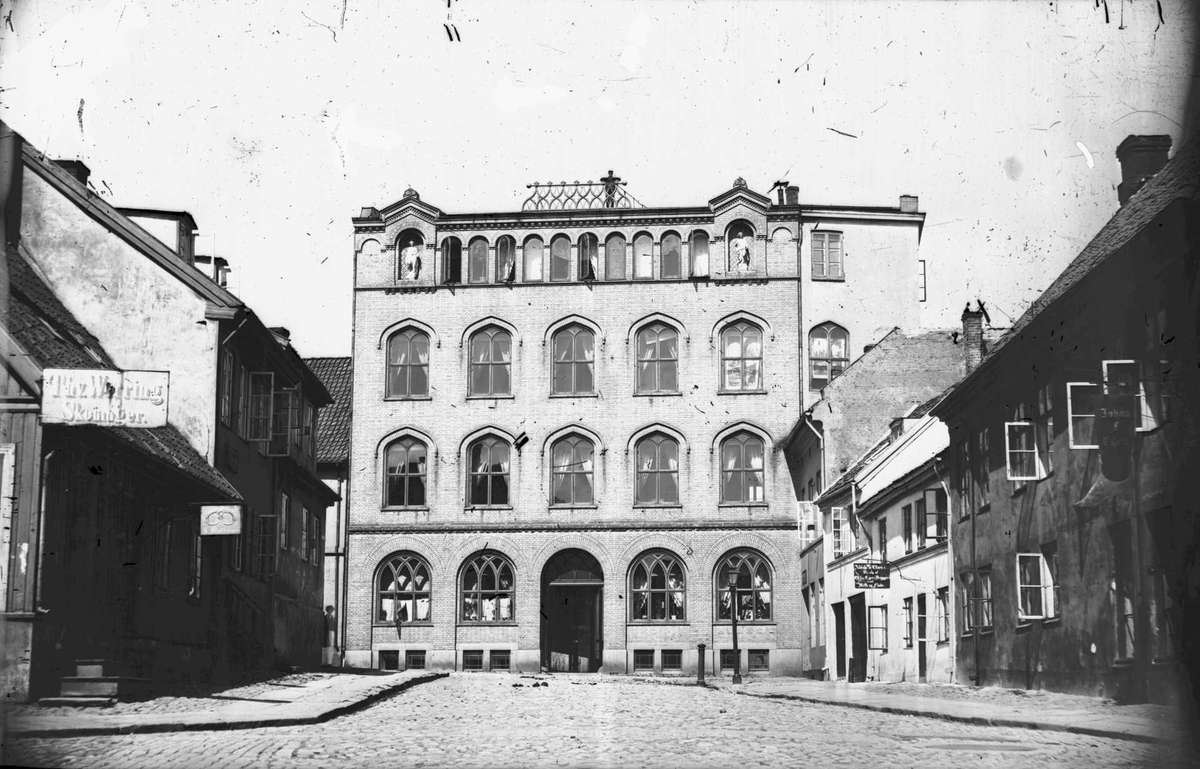
The old building of Nissen's Girls' School. The Pauss family lived on the top floor

She and her husband were the leaders and owners of the private Nissen's Girls' School, the pioneer of higher girls' schools in Norway, for several decades. She served as the school's first teacher or headmistress and was the only woman in the school's management from 1885 to 1909.

She was also one of the early leaders of the Norwegian Santal Mission, a humanitarian and missionary organisation that was active among the Santhal people of India. In 1907, she succeeded her husband as editor of the organisation's journal Santalen ("The Santal") and also became a member of its executive board, as the first woman elected to the national leadership of a Norwegian missionary organization. The village of Pauspur in India was named for her husband.

She was also a member of the board of directors of the School for Young Ladies in Christian Augusts Gade, one of the key leaders and a board member of the Morality Association and a board member of the Association for the Promotion of the Proper Use of Sunday, of which Supreme Court Justice Edward Hambro was chairman. Together with e.g. Moltke Moe, Erik Werenskiold, Gina Krog, Axel Johannessen, Erika Nissen and Bjørnstjerne Bjørnson, she was among the co-authors of the book Forældre og Børn, edited by Aksel Arstal (1902).
