= Augustin Paus =

Norwegian engineer and industrial leader

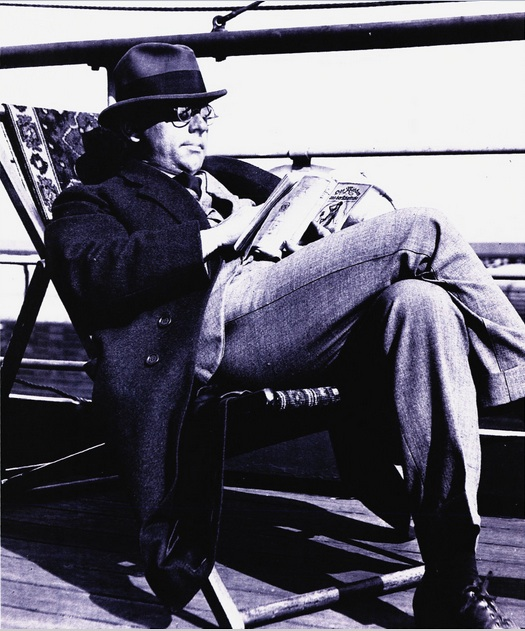
Augustin Paus during the construction of the Rånåsfoss hydroelectric power plant

Augustin Thoresen Paus (22 July 1881, in Christiania – 20 September 1945) was a Norwegian engineer and industrial leader who played a key role in hydropower development in Norway through the first half of the 20th century. He graduated as an officer from the Military Academy and as a civil engineer from Dresden, starting his engineering career at Norsk Hydro as an associate of Sam Eyde during the development of the Rjukan industrial facilities. From 1918, he led the construction of the hydroelectric Rånåsfoss power plant, one of the largest in Europe. Upon its completion in 1922, he became the first managing director of Akershus elektrisitetsverk (now Akershus Energi), a position he held until his death around two decades later. He was described as the "absolute ruler" of the industrial community that emerged at Rånåsfoss. He also held several other positions in the Norwegian power industry and was described as "one of the most prominent leaders in the Norwegian energy industry." He served as chairman of Glommens og Laagens Brukseierforening, Foreningen Samkjøringen—the precursor to the Nordic electricity exchange Nord Pool—the Norwegian Museum of Cultural History, and several power companies.

== Career ==
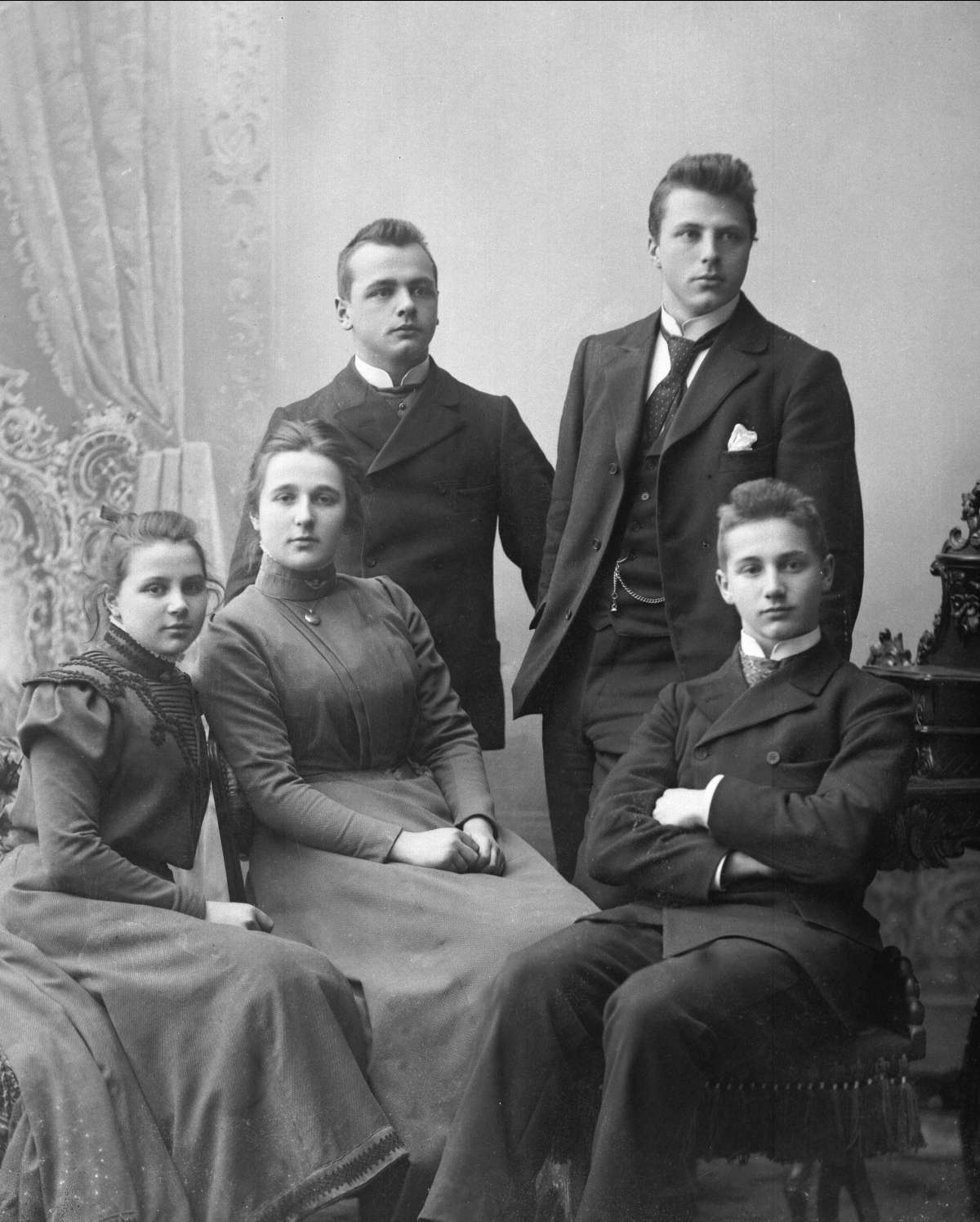
Augustin (third from left) with his siblings Louise, Henriette, Nikolai and George, photographed by Gustav Borgen

At age 15 he put to sea without parental permission and only returned two years later in 1898 to pass his examen artium university entrance exam in 1900. He graduated from the Norwegian Military Academy in 1901 and became a second lieutenant in the Norwegian Army from 1901 and a first lieutenant from 1914. He graduated as an engineer from the Dresden University of Technology in 1906. After living in London 1906–1907, he became an engineer at A/S Rjukanfos, working with Sam Eyde. He was chief engineer in the hydropower project in the Arendal watercourse from 1912, chief engineer at Elkem from 1915 and chief engineer in the construction of Bjølvo power plant in Hardanger from 1916. He became chief engineer and head of development for the construction of the Rånåsfoss power plant in 1918. At its peak, he was in charge in 1,200 employees at the construction site. He was the first managing director of Akershus Energi from 1922 until his death in 1945. He became one of the foremost leaders of the hydropower industry in Norway and has been described as the "absolute ruler" of the industrial community at Rånåsfoss. Although a director's villa was built for him at Rånåsfoss, he eventually moved back to Oslo, and led the company from its Oslo office in Kongens gate 14.

He was elected by the Parliament as a deputy member of the board of the directors of the Norwegian Water Resources and Energy Directorate from 1919. He was chairman of the board of directors of the companies Norsk Folkemuseum, Glommens og Laagens Brukseierforening, Funnefoss Tresliperi og Elektrisitetsverk, A/S Brødbølfoss Elektrisitetsverk, a co-founder and chairman of the board of directors of Foreningen Samkjøringen (the predecessor of both Nord Pool Spot, the largest power market in Europe, and of NASDAQ OMX Commodities Europe), and a board member of other power companies. He published a book on the construction of the Rånåsfoss plant in 1925.

The road Pausvegen at Rånåsfoss is named in his honour (Akershus Energi is headquartered in Pausvegen 6).

== Personal life ==
Augustin Paus was a son of the theologian Bernhard Pauss and Anna Henriette Wegner, and was a grandson of the industrialist Benjamin Wegner and Henriette Seyler (whose family owned Berenberg Bank).

He was married to Helga Jacobsen, daughter of ship-owner from Flekkefjord and Member of Parliament Hans Sivert Jacobsen. He had four sons, among them the industrial leader Bernhard Paus, long-time CEO of Nora.

== Publications ==
- Aug[ustin] Paus, Akershus elektricitetsverk og utbygningen av Raanaasfoss kraftverk, Oslo, Grøndahl, 1925, 170 pages

== Literature ==
- Bjørnsen, Bjørn, En fortelling om fossen og samfunnet, ISBN 8299425204, 1997
- Hoel, Kari, Rånåsfoss kraftverk, Rånåsfoss, 1989
