= Nikolai Nissen Paus =

Norwegian surgeon, hospital director and humanitarian

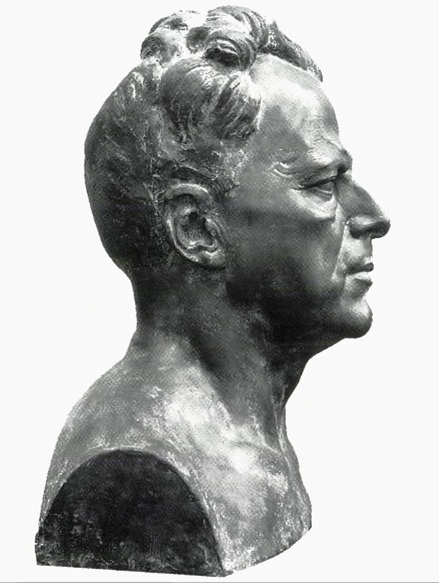

President of the Norwegian Red Cross
- In office 1945–1947
- Preceded by: Fridtjof Heyerdahl
- Succeeded by: Erling Steen

Personal details
- Born: 4 June 1877 Christiania
- Died: 23 December 1956 (aged 79) Tønsberg
- Parents: Bernhard Pauss (father); Henriette Wegner (mother)

Nikolai Nissen Paus (4 June 1877, in Christiania – 23 December 1956, in Tønsberg) was a Norwegian surgeon, hospital director and humanitarian. He was the director of Vestfold Hospital from 1918 to 1947, building and decisively shaping the institution. He served as President of the Norwegian Red Cross, President of the Norwegian Florence Nightingale Committee and chaired several governmental committees. He led and took part in the Norwegian humanitarian effort in Finland during the Winter War as the head of the Norwegian Red Cross field hospital. He also served on the executive board of the Norwegian Medical Association. He received the Order of St. Olav for his "long-standing and distinguished humanitarian work" in 1948 and was described by Aftenposten as "one of the country's preeminent physicians" on his death.

== Career ==
After graduating from Aars and Voss School, Paus entered the Royal Frederick University, where he graduated as a medical doctor in 1903. He also became a second lieutenant in 1896 and a first lieutenant in 1905. He was conferred the dr.med. (D.Sc.) degree in 1916, with a dissertation on tuberculosis. Between 1903 and 1918, he worked at a number of hospitals and visited several foreign hospitals. He was a deputy consultant in surgery at the National Hospital 1912–1917. In 1916 he was appointed senior consultant and managing director of the Jarlsberg and Larvik Hospital (renamed Vestfold Hospital in 1918), but did not assume his position before 1918. He served as director of Vestfold Hospital until 1947, building and decisively shaping the institution. He organised and participated in humanitarian work in Finland during the Winter War. He served two terms on the executive board of the Norwegian Medical Association. He was described by Aftenposten as "one of the country's preeminent physicians" on his death.

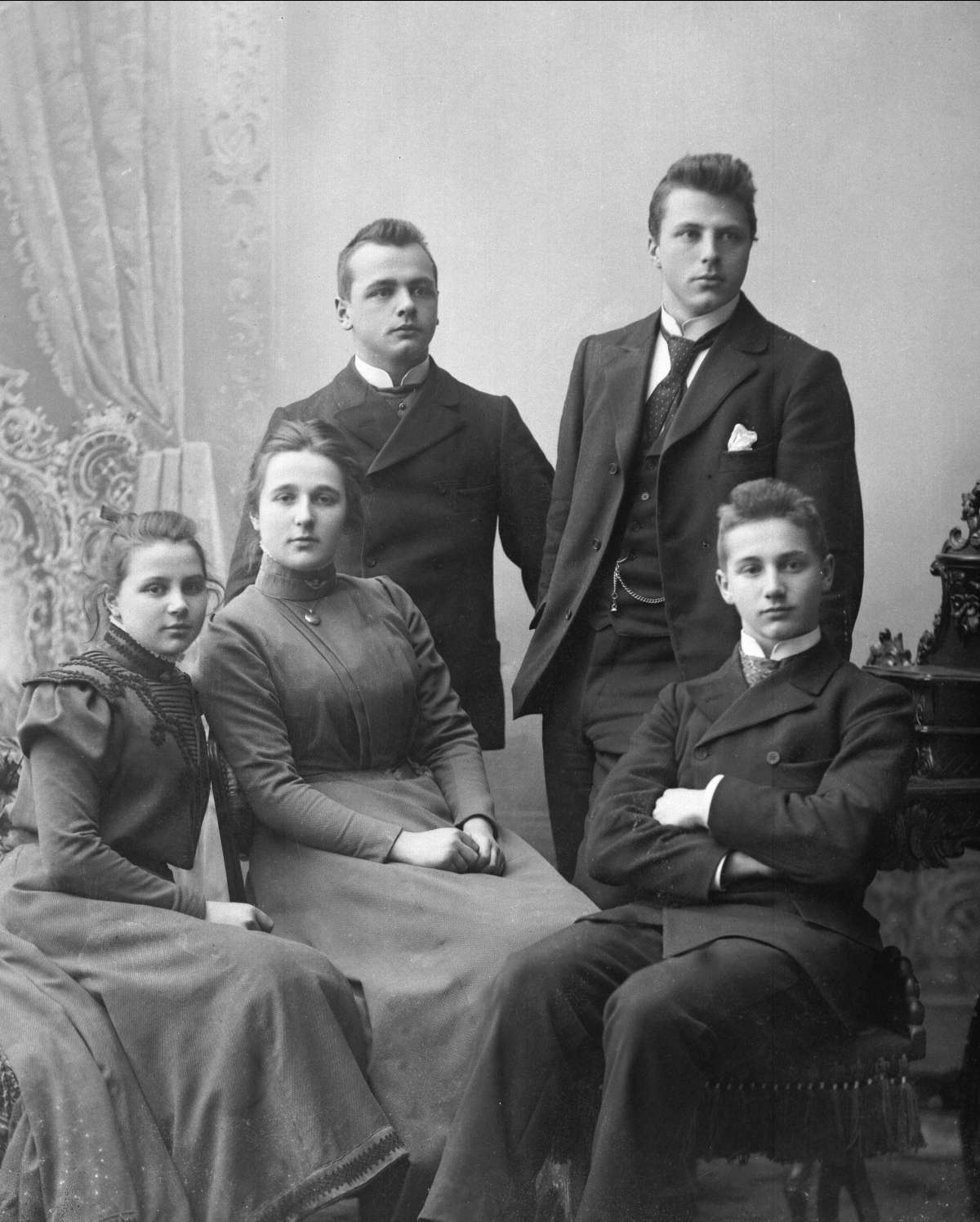
Nikolai (second from right) with his siblings Louise, Henriette, Augustin and George, photographed by Gustav Borgen

A member of the Paus family, Nikolai Nissen Paus was a son of the theologian Bernhard Cathrinus Pauss and Anna Henriette Wegner. He was a grandson of the industrialist Benjamin Wegner and his grandmother was a member of the Berenberg banking family of Hamburg. His paternal grandfather Nicolai Nissen Pauss was a ship-owner in Drammen, and he was ultimately named for his 6th great grandfather, Danish estate owner and high court judge Nikolaj Nissen. He was a brother of the barrister and Director at the Norwegian Employers' Confederation George Wegner Paus and of the hydropower executive Augustin Paus.

In 1907, he married Sofie Amalie Brandt Ødegaard, daughter of colonel and freemason leader Vilhelm Ødegaard and granddaughter of timber merchant and Member of Parliament Frederik J. Holst. They were the parents of Inger-Helvig Ødegaard Paus, who married barrister and employer representative Jens Christian Rogstad, surgeon, humanitarian and Grand Master of the Norwegian Order of Freemasons Bernhard Paus, who married humanitarian Brita Collett, and barrister, diplomat and managing director of Press Paper, Ltd. in London Vilhelm Paus, who married Anne Collett. His daughters-in-law Brita and Anne Collett were daughters of estate owner Axel Collett and Lucie Trozelli Krefting, and nieces of the noted pediatrician Arthur Collett.

Nikolai Nissen Paus was a freemason of the XI and second highest degree, and held the third highest office in the Norwegian Order of Freemasons. He has been portrayed in a drawing and an oil painting by Erik Werenskiold (both 1934) and busts by sculptors Wilhelm Rasmussen (1939) and Carl E. Paulsen (1947). The bust by Rasmussen is displayed outside Vestfold Hospital.

== Honours ==
- (Belgium) Belgian order (1939)
- Order of the Cross of Liberty with Sword of Finland (1941)
- Croix de l'Ordre de la Santé publique of France (1947)
- (Finland) Finnish order (1947)
- Honorary member of the Norwegian Red Cross (1947)
- Knight First Class of the Order of St. Olav of Norway, for "long-standing and distinguished humanitarian work" (1948)
- Badge of Honour of the Norwegian Order of Freemasons
