= Johannes Skaar =

19th and 20th-century Norwegian bishop

The Right Reverend Johannes Nilsson Skaar
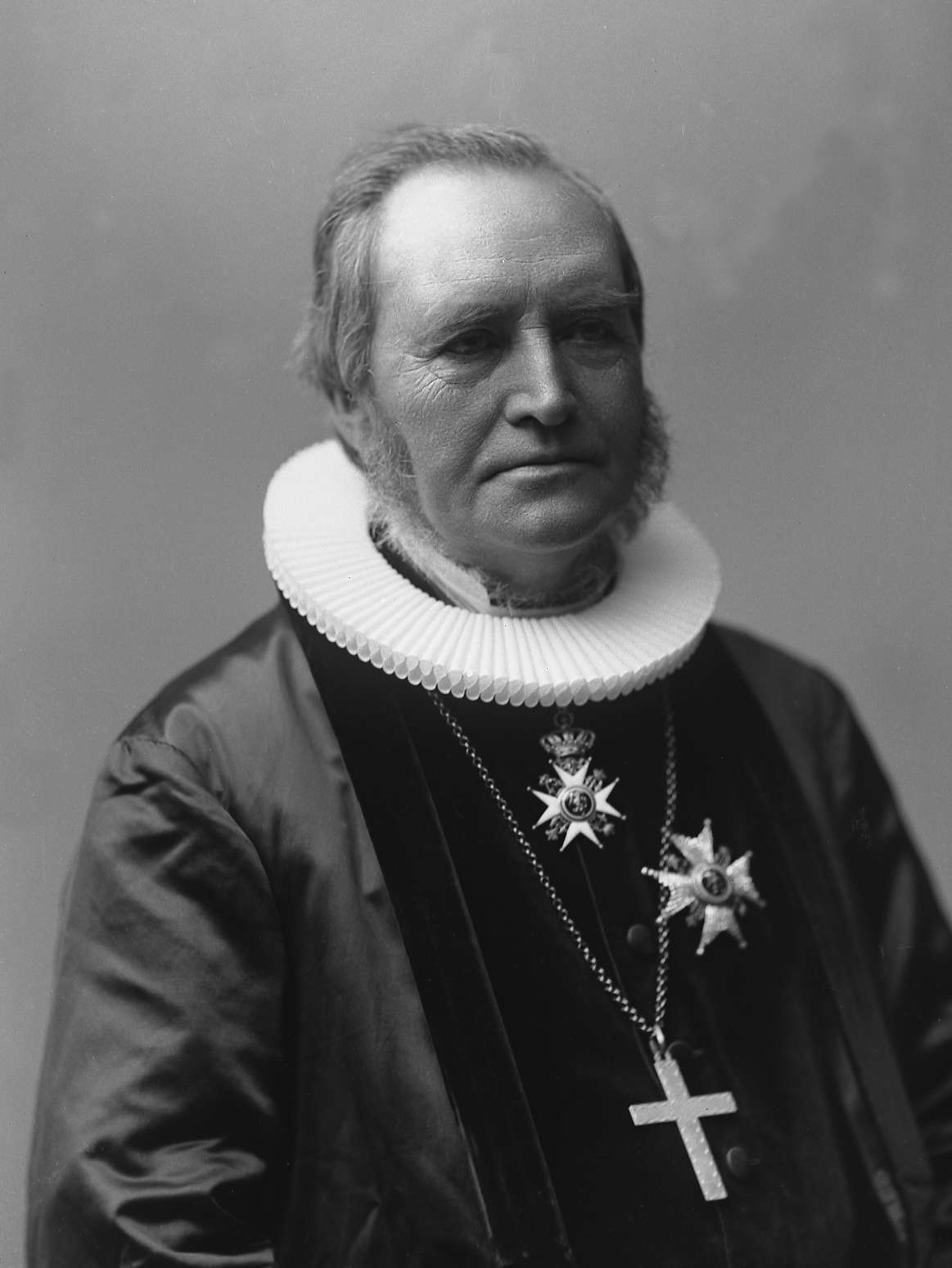
- Johannes Nilsson Skaar, photographed by Gustav Borgen
- Church: Church of Norway

Personal details
- Born: 15 November 1828 Kvam, Norway
- Died: 13 December 1904 (aged 76) Trondheim, Norway
- Denomination: Christian
- Parents: Nils Gjermundsen Skaar; Elseber Torgeirsdatter Flatabø
- Spouse: Cathinka Wilhelmine Pauline Hansen (1857-1896); Marie Jacoba Flood (1898-1904)
- Occupation: Priest
- Education: cand.theol. (1857)

Johannes Nilssøn Skaar (also spelled Johannes Nilsson Skaar) (15 November 1828 – 13 December 1904) was a Norwegian bishop and hymnologist.

Skaar was born in Øystese, Kvam, Norway in 1828. He received his cand.theol. degree in 1857. Skaar began his career in Skien where he was a chaplain. He went on to be a parish priest in Gjerpen Municipality in 1872. In 1885, he was named the bishop of the Diocese of Tromsø. He served in that post until 1892 when he was appointed as the bishop of the Diocese of Nidaros. He served there until his death in 1904. He was decorated a Knight of the Royal Norwegian Order of St. Olav in 1887 and then a Commander of the same order in 1893.

Skaar's daughter Anna Elisabet was married to politician Sven Adolf Svensen.

== Selected works ==
- Lovsange og aandelige Viser (1863)
- Norsk salmehistorie (1879–1880)

Church of Norway
Preceded by Jakob Sverdrup Smitt	Bishop of Tromsø; 1885–1892	Succeeded by Peter Wilhelm Kreydahl Bøckmann
Preceded by Niels Laache	Bishop of Trondhjem; 1892–1904	Succeeded by Vilhelm Andreas Wexelsen
