= Santalen =

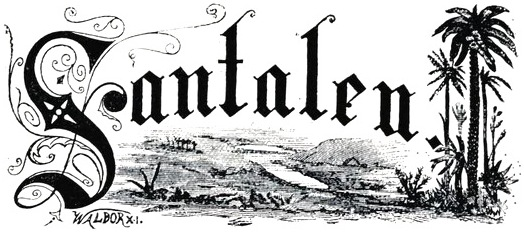
- Editor: Bernhard Pauss, Henriette Pauss
- Publisher: Norwegian Santal Mission
- Founder: Bernhard Pauss
- First issue: 1883; 142 years ago
- Final issue: 2001; 24 years ago
- Country: Norway
- Language: Norwegian

Santalen was a magazine published by the Norwegian Santal Mission from 1883 to 2001. The journal was founded and edited by Bernhard Pauss, who was also the chairman of the Norwegian Santal Mission's central committee from 1887 to 1907. Following his death his widow Henriette Pauss became editor. The journal had a circulation of around 5,000 in the 1880s and 14,000 in 1977. In 2001 the Norwegian Santal Mission merged to become part of Normisjon, and the publication was succeeded by Agenda 3:16.
