= Læsebog i Modersmaalet =

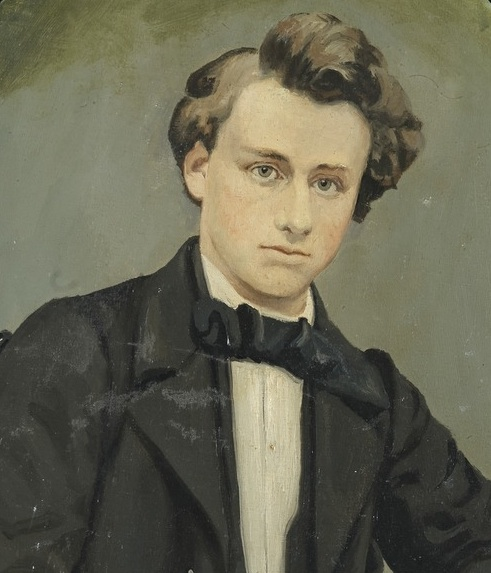
Bernhard Cathrinus Paus (1916)

Læsebog i Modersmaalet (informally referred to as "Pauss og Lassen"), later titled Hjemme og ute and Heime og ute, was a reading book series that was published in numerous editions between 1884 and 1958 and that was widely used in the school system of Norway for around 80 years. The work's original authors were Bernhard Cathrinus Pauss and Hartvig Lassen. After Lassen's death, the series was edited by Pauss and Andreas Martin Corneliussen, and after Pauss' death by Corneliussen and Olaf Ellefsen. From 1921, the work was edited by Mathilde Munch and Sven Svensen and retitled Hjemme og ute. At times, the series was used by half of all pupils in Norwegian schools.

The first edition was published eight years before Nordahl Rolfsen's Læsebog for Folkeskolen, and was more strongly characterized by the continuity from the Danish literary heritage, although it also featured the first contours of the Norwegian literary golden age.
