= Hedevig Rosing =

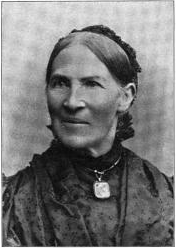
Hedvig Rosing, 1895

Hedevig Rosing (16 May 1827 – 30 November 1913) was a Danish-born Norwegian author, educator, school founder, and suffragist. She specialized in teaching the deaf-mute. She was the first woman to teach in Copenhagen's public schools.

== Biography ==
=== Denmark ===
Hedevig Sophie Rosing was born on 16 May 1827 in Horsens, Denmark. Her parents were Ulrik Frederik Rosing (1776–1841), a priest, and Ursula Sophie Lasson (1786–1838). She grew up in Central Jutland, where she worked as a governess. In 1860, she became the first woman teacher in Copenhagen's public schools.

=== Norway ===
In 1865, Rosing traveled to Norway to visit family. On 9 September that year she married her cousin, the Norwegian agricultural school teacher, Anton Rosing (1828–67), and emigrated to Norway. Two years later, she became a widow. Having removed to Oslo after her husband's death, Rosing started teaching at an elementary school in 1868.

In the capital city, she became acquainted with issues concerning women's equity and those that are important to teachers. There, she met Fredrik Glad Balchen, a pioneer in deaf-mute education, who had developed a method for teaching deaf people. In 1872, she became a teacher at Balchen's institute. During her time here, she made a plan to set up her own school for the deaf-mute using a "purer oral method". In the summer of 1880, with public scholarship funding, she visited several countries to study their teaching methods for the deaf, and, as the only representative from the Nordic countries, she attended the Second International Congress on Education of the Deaf.

In 1881, she gave up on her plan to create a small family school, because she could not get state support for it subsequent to the passage of the Abnormal School Law of that year. But using a state subsidy, she founded Fru Rosing's Speech School for Deaf-Mute in 1881. Using the "pure speech method", it was first located in "Little Bloksbjerg", in Briskeby, Oslo, relocating three years later to "Høien" at St. Hanshaugen. She managed it until 1895, when she retired with the largest pension (1200 SEK; 1200 DKK) that a woman was ever granted in Norway. She was a member (the only woman) of the school commission set up by Minister Johan Sverdrup that was to prepare the Folkeskole Act of 1889.

Rosing published two collections of her late husband's documents, Ungdomstid og Reiseliv (1869) and Anton Rosings Alvorsliv (1871), as well as her father's account of his work as a priest in Great Britain with Danish-Norwegian prisoners of war during the period of 1807 until 1814. She also wrote a series of pieces about folk life and history. Two school books were very successful, Barnets første bog (1879, and several editions thereafter) and Veiledning ved undervisning i samtidig læsning og skrivning efter lyd- og stavemethoden (Guidance on Teaching in Simultaneous Reading and Writing according to the Sound and Spelling method). She wrote several papers on teaching deaf-mutes, as well as articles regarding children's education, school teachers, female education, and women in society.

With Fredrikke Marie Qvam, Gina Krog, Aasta Hansteen, and others, Rosing was a leader in Norway's woman suffrage movement. In 1908, she was one of the Norwegian representatives who attended the Fourth Conference of the International Woman Suffrage Alliance in Amsterdam. Rosing was a member of the National Windmill Association, the Norwegian Association of Deaf Teachers, and The Deaf Association in Kristiania. She was a board member of the Oslo Døveforening until 1896.

She died on 30 November 1913 in Oslo and is buried in that city's Cemetery of Our Saviour together with her spouse.

== Awards ==
- 1907, Citizens' Council Medal in Silver

== Selected works ==
- Ungdomstid og Reiseliv. Udvalg af Anton Rosings Breve og Optegnelser, 1869
- Anton Rosings Alvorsliv. Et Minde, 1871
- Livet paa de engelske Fangeskibe 1807–14, 1875
- Billed-A.B.C. i Farvetryk, 1876
- Nogle Ord om de Døvstumme, 1878
- Barnets første Bog. Med 58 Billeder, 1879 (20th edition 1916)
- Veiledning ved Undervisning i samtidig Læsning og Skrivning efter Lyd- og Stave-Methoden, 1879
- Om Døvstummes Undervisning, 1883
- Udkast til Læsebog for Døve Børn i de første Skoleaar, 1884
- Udkast til Læsebog for døve Børn i Mellemklassene, 1887
- En liden Religionsbog til Skolebrug, 1890
- 1878–1903. De døves forenings 25-aars jubilæum. Et festskrift, 1903
