= Herman Wedel Jarlsberg =

Norwegian politician

Count Wedel Jarlsberg

Governor-general of Norway
- In office 16 September 1836 – 27 August 1840
- Monarch: Karl III Johan
- Preceded by: Baltzar von Platen
- Succeeded by: Severin Løvenskiold

Personal details
- Born: Johan Caspar Herman Wedel Jarlsberg; 21 September 1779 Montpellier, France
- Died: 27 August 1840 (aged 60) Wiesbaden, Germany
- Resting place: Jarlsberg Manor
- Spouse: Karen Anker (m. 1807)
- Children: Harald Wedel-Jarlsberg; Herman Wedel-Jarlsberg

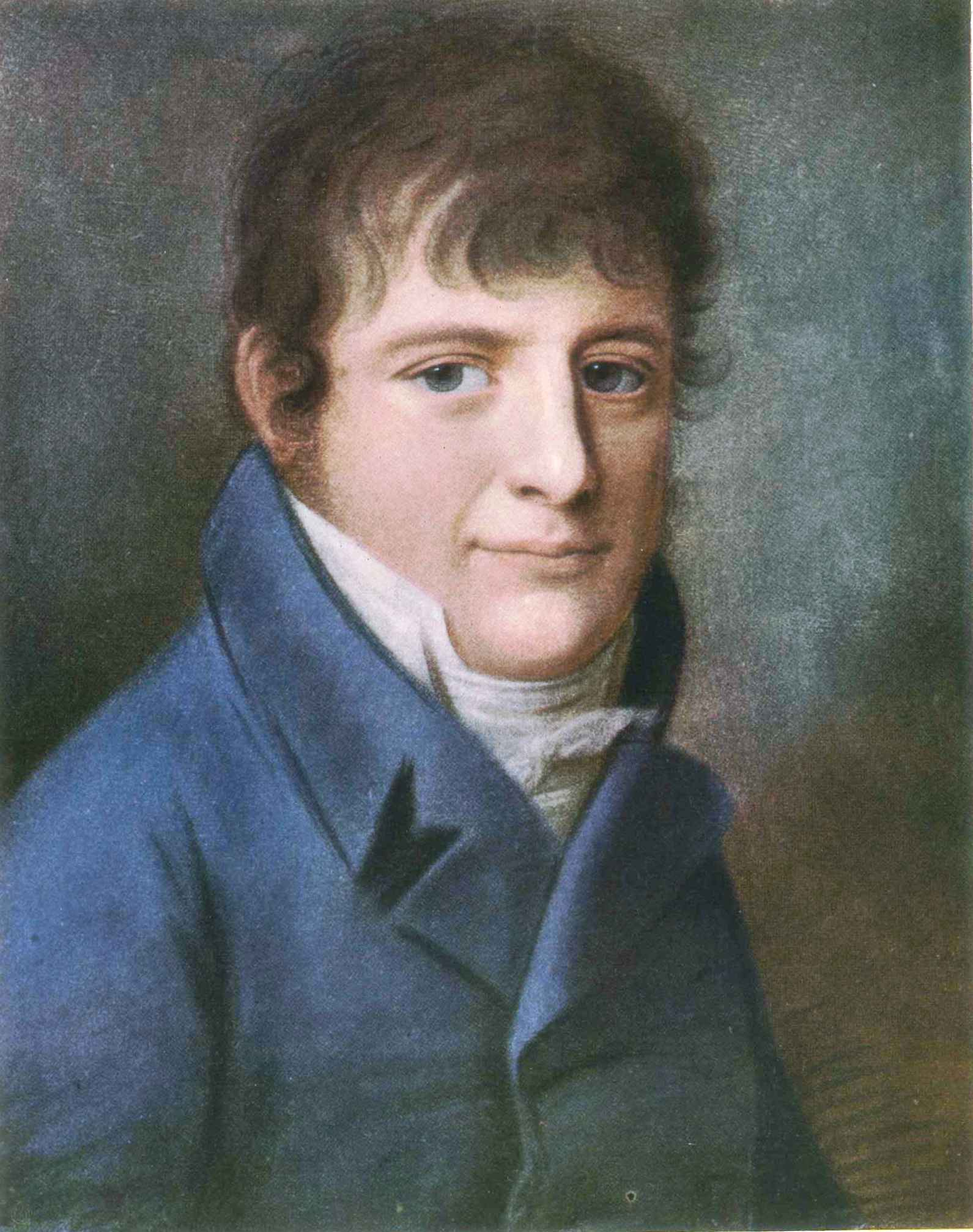
Portrait of Herman Wedel Jarlsberg (by the Danish painter Christian Horneman, circa 1805)

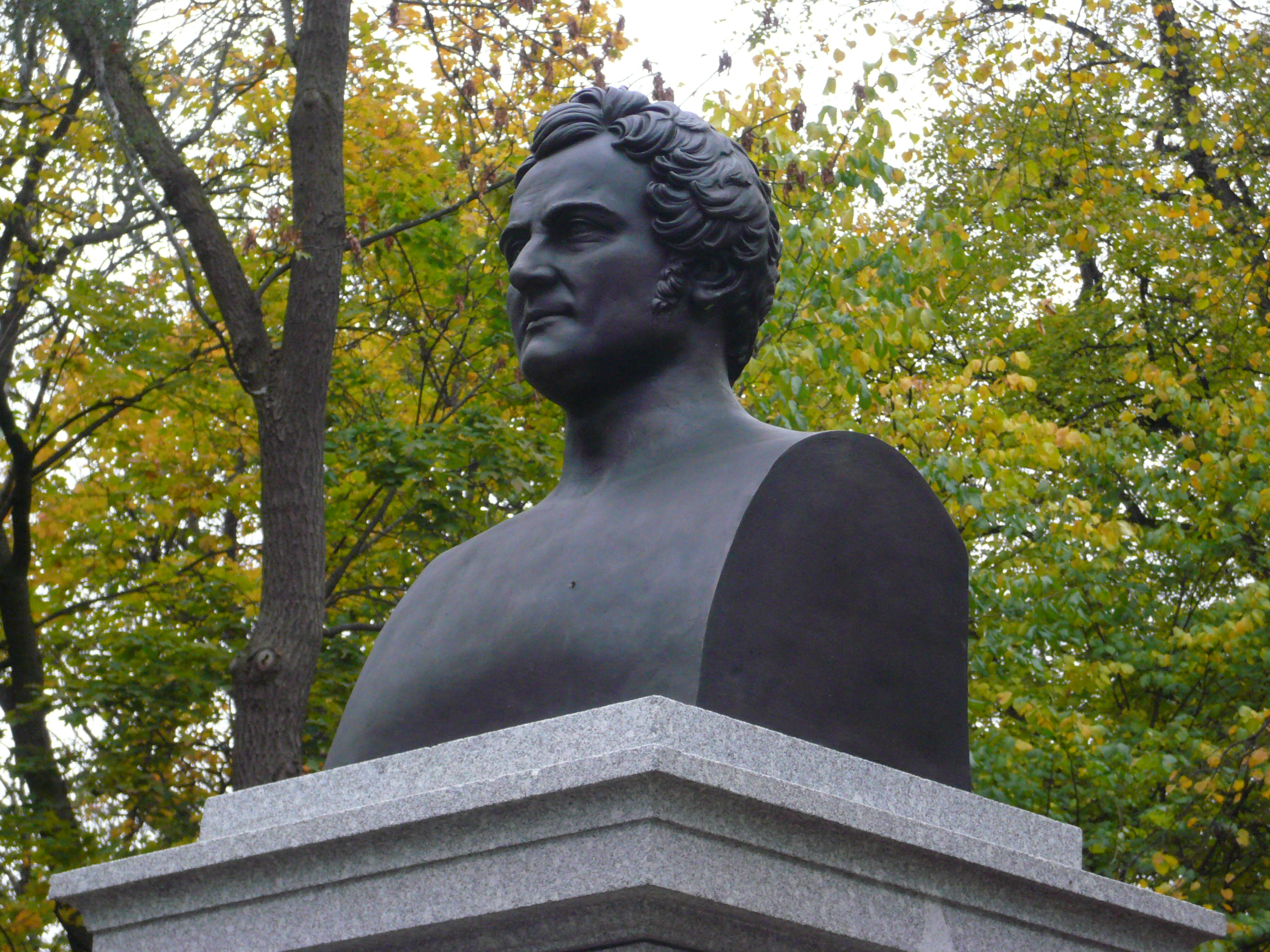
Bust of Herman Wedel Jarlsberg at Bygdøy in Oslo

Count Johan Caspar Herman Wedel Jarlsberg (21 September 1779 – 27 August 1840) was a Norwegian statesman and nobleman. He played an active role in the constitutional assembly at Eidsvoll in 1814 and was the first native Norwegian to hold the post of Governor-general of Norway with the authority of a viceroy, representing the absent king of Norway as head of the Norwegian cabinet during the union with Sweden.

== Background ==
Wedel Jarlsberg was born in Montpellier, France, son of diplomat Frederik Anton Wedel-Jarlsberg (1748–1811) and Catharina von Storm (1756–1802). His younger brother Ferdinand Carl Maria Wedel-Jarlsberg (1781–1857) was a military officer and commanding general of the Royal Norwegian Army.

He grew up in London, where his father was serving as diplomat on behalf of Denmark-Norway. From 1794 to 1798, he was tutored by Friedrich August Nitsch, who had studied under Immanuel Kant. Wedel Jarlsberg fled with his brother Frederik Anton in June 1799, to get away from their abusive father. After getting to Edinburgh, they got on a boat to Copenhagen, where their mother had fled to some years earlier, to get away from her husband. There he studied law at the University of Copenhagen and graduated in 1801. He accepted a commission as the king's county governor for the district of Buskerud in 1806.

== Career ==
During the Napoleonic Wars, his connections with Sweden increased, and when the appointed and adopted Swedish crown prince, Carl August died in 1810, his name was mentioned as a possible substitute in a desperate situation. Jean Baptiste Bernadotte was appointed and adopted and changed his name to Carl Johan.

Wedel Jarlsberg was elected to the National Assembly at Eidsvold in April–May 1814 as representative of the County of Jarlsberg. His engagement for a Norwegian union with Sweden did not diminish. He maintained strongly that Norwegian interests were often contrary to the Danish, and that after the Swedes had adopted a constitution in 1809, Norwegian interests would be more strongly secured in a union with that country. He was of course well aware of the Swedish campaign to incorporate Norway as a substitution for the lost Finnish provinces. In some popular works, Count Wedel Jarlsberg has been described as a traitor – a fifth-columnist – which is completely unjust. His opinions were well known to the educated public, and even if he was politically isolated to some extent, his title and position in the Norwegian society never changed much.

During Norway's efforts to secure independence from Denmark and Sweden in 1814, he hence advocated a moderate approach to the issue. He was the obvious leader of the party, which has been named "the Union Party"or "the Swedish Party". He maintained that Norway would not manage to stand completely alone, alienated from all the leading powers in Europe, which had unanimously guaranteed Norway as a Swedish province. But there is no evidence that his point of view in any sense prevented him from fighting for a Norwegian constitution inspired by those of the United States and France, which the Swedish constitution was not. He belonged to the minority in the main topic on the Constitutional Assembly at Eidsvoll, but he was vindicated by subsequent events.

He was made Minister of Finance in 1814 and served in this role until 1822. His efforts to restore a Norwegian monetary policy were successful, and he was without contest as the leading force of the government – even with Swedish governors as the formal leaders of the cabinet. His relations with King Carl Johan had at that time cooled to a point where close cooperation was no longer possible. He was elected to Stortinget in 1824, where he served until 1832. He was president of Parliament twice, in 1824 and 1830, and in 1836, after relations with the king had improved again, he was appointed governor and held that post until his death at Wiesbaden in 1840. The choice of him as governor was a popular one. He was almost unanimously respected because of his obvious political and administrative talents. His status as a nobleman in a country where nobility had been abolished as early as in 1821 (those wearing a title were still maintaining them, but no new titles would ever be given or inherited), did not diminish Norwegian affection for him. It is beyond doubt that his contributions to diminish the rather aggressive relations between the Parliament – the Storting – and King Carl Johan were decisive.

== Personal life ==
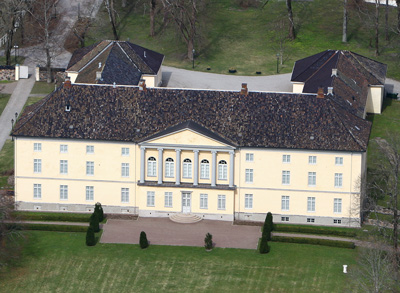
Jarlsberg Hovedgård

Wedel Jarlsberg was married to Karen Anker, the only child of prime minister Peder Anker. From her family he inherited a vast fortune, consisting mostly of the forests around Christiania – present day Oslo. At the death of his father-in-law Peder Anker in 1824, Wedel also inherited Bogstad gård, Vækerø gård and Bærums Verk. In 1812, Johan Caspar Herman Wedel Jarlsberg rebuilt the manor house at Jarlsberg (Jarlsberg hovedgård) in the empire style. Around the manor there were arranged big, but simple garden and parks areas.

== Other sources ==
- Barton, Hildor Arnold (2003). Sweden and visions of Norway: politics and culture, 1814–1905. (SIU Press). ISBN 0-8093-2441-5.
- Carl Emil Vogt (2014) Herman Wedel Jarlsberg. Den aristokratiske opprøreren (Oslo: Cappelen Damm) ISBN 9788202448080

Preceded by Baltzar von Platen	Governor-general of Norway; 1836–1840	Succeeded by Severin Løvenskiold
