= Bent Salvesen =

- Born: 20 October 1787; Hesnes, Grimstad Municipality, Norway
- Died: 17 September 1820 (aged 32); Santander, Spain
- Known for: Ship's captain in the merchant navy, lieutenant in the Royal Danish Navy, privateer
- Spouse: Goran Cathrine Fegth

Bent Salvesen (20 October 1787 – 17 September 1820) was a Norwegian ship's captain, privateer and adventurer. During the Gunboat War he served as a lieutenant in the Royal Danish Navy and then engaged in privateering, commanding one of the two private ships from Drammen which received the letter of marque from the Dano-Norwegian government that authorized them to attack British ships. In 1817 he abandoned his family to undertake a long voyage to the East Indies as an officer of a Danish ship, and died three years later in Spain as the captain of a Danish ship, never having returned. Bent Salvesen is remembered for his lively personality, wit, and adventurous lifestyle, and was the subject of stories and anecdotes, with several sayings attributed to him. He was remembered in the oral tradition of Drammen a century after his death.

== Background ==
He was a son of ship's captain and ship-owner Salve Olsen Hesnes (1749–1813) and Louise Bentsdatter (1760–1814), and his ancestors on both sides had been ship's captains from today's Grimstad and Arendal for generations. He was named for his maternal grandfather, ship's captain Bent Pedersen Kolbjørnsviken (1724–1781) from Kolbjørnsvik. He was married to Goron Cathrine Fegth (1785–1838), a daughter of the Drammen timber merchant Jacob Fegth.

== Naval officer and privateer ==
After serving as a lieutenant in the Navy from 1807, he became a burgher in Strømsø on 19 September 1810 and sailed as a captain of his father-in-law's ships. Aged 26, he received letter of marque on 10 November 1813 for his ship Recovery (owned by Niels and Gabriel Omsted) with 14 cannons and a crew of 30 men. The ship was taken over by the Navy in 1814.

== East Indies ==
In 1817, he left his wife and seven children, and went on a long voyage to the East Indies as an officer of a Danish ship. He did not return, and died in 1820 in the Spanish port town Santander, aged 33. He had been employed as captain of a Danish ship bound for Spain in Copenhagen in 1820, after returning from the East Indies.

On 18 September 1818, his wife petitioned the King for burghership of Strømsø in her own right to be able to support herself and her children. Parish priest of Skoger and Tangen, Andreas Jacob Lund, wrote in a recommendation of the application on 25 September 1818 that his wife, "Goran Cathrine Salvesen has always distinguished herself by her diligence and concern for her children's upbringing. A rare and totally inexcusable indifference to her, his children and his household, on the other hand, has always characterised her husband, Captain Bent Salvesen. Based on his behaviour in his absence, she has no reason to hope for any contribution to her or her children's subsistence. She therefore must provide for her family herself." The application was finally granted on 14 December 1823, after being recommended by many of Strømsø's leading men and by governor Johan Collett.

== Bent Salvesen in cultural history ==
According to Alfthan Vogt Brocklesby Juel, Bent Salvesen was well known in Drammen for his witty humour, giving rise to several sayings in Norway. One example is the phrase "it cannot last forever, said (Bent) Salvesen", which he reportedly uttered when he accidentally tore his new coat. Another saying attributed to him was "Gladly for me, said (Bent) Salvesen," which he wrote in a guest book as a response to a haughty citizen. These anecdotes and witticisms added to his reputation as a charismatic and entertaining individual.

== Issue ==
He was the father of, among others, Jacob Fegth Salvesen (born 1809), who settled in Africa and married an English woman, of ship's merchant in Antwerp Iver Feght Salvesen (born 1817), and of Caroline Louise Salvesen (1812–1887). Some of his children grew up with their uncle Anders Juel, a ship-owner in Skoger near Drammen. Bent Salvesen has descendants with names including Salvesen, Paus, Høeg, Kapteijn, Løvenskiold, Wessel, and other names.
