= Fraternitas and Gevjon =

Fraternitas and Gevjon were originally societies for pupils at Drammen Latin School, and the societies continue today at the Latin School's successor, Drammen Upper Secondary School. Fraternitas (Latin for "fraternity") is a male fraternity, and was founded as a literary fraternity under the name of Silentium ("silence") on 19 November 1850. 22 members of the original Silentium are known, and the fraternity's existence remained secret for ten years. Gevjon was founded in 1911 as a girl sorority and the sister society of Fraternitas, and was named for the goddess Gefjon in Norse mythology.

== Notable members ==
The 22 members of the original fraternity Silentium include

- Anders Nicolai Kiær, the first director-general of Statistics Norway
- Georg August Thilesen, cabinet minister and industrialist
- Michael Schjelderup Hansson, director of Storebrand
- Bernhard Pauss, theologian and educator
