= Sven Adolf Svensen =

Norwegian politician

- Born: 29 January 1863; Brunlanes, Norway
- Died: 21 May 1943 (aged 80)
- Occupations: Schoolteacher; Politician
- Relatives: Johannes Skaar (father-in-law)

Sven Adolf Svensen (29 January 1863 – 21 May 1943) was a Norwegian schoolteacher and politician.

He was born in Brunlanes Municipality to Søren Henrik Svensen and Oleane Nilsdatter. He was married to Anna Elisabet Skaar, and was thus son-in-law of bishop Johannes Skaar. He worked as schoolteacher in Gjerpen Municipality and Christiania, and school inspector in Trondheim and Drammen. He was elected representative to the Storting for five periods from 1922 to 1936, for the Conservative Party. His publications include Bibelhistorie for Middelskolen og for folkeskolen, Lærebok i grammatik, analyse og tegnsætning (1901), Trondhjem, byen og dens historie (1907), Katekisme-undervisning (1922) and Drammens tekn. aftenskole i 50 år (1936). He was decorated Knight, First Class of the Order of St. Olav in 1934.

== See also ==
- Læsebog i Modersmaalet
