= Ivar Ueland =

Norwegian politician (1943–2020)

Ivar Ueland (6 August 1943 – 27 August 2020) was a Norwegian politician from the Conservative Party.

He was born in Sauda, but moved to Stavanger already in 1947. He moved to Oslo in 1965 to attend the Norwegian Police University College, and worked as a law enforcer in the Asker and Bærum Police District from 1967 to his retirement in 2000. He moved to Asker in 1969.

He was a member of the municipal council of Asker Municipality from 1975 to 1983 and 1991 to 1999, and of Akershus county council from 1983 to 1991 and 1999 to present. He was the board chairman of Akershus Energi and Bio Varme Akershus, and was also a member of the political administration group of Oslo Package 3.
