= Vilhelm Paus =

Norwegian lawyer, diplomat and business executive

Vilhelm Christian Ødegård Paus (born 25 April 1915 in Oslo, died 22 November 1995 in London) was a Norwegian lawyer, diplomat and business executive in the pulp and paper industry. He held leadership positions in Norsk Hydro, Borregaard and what is now Norske Skog, and was managing director of Press Paper Ltd. in London from 1969.

== Career ==
He graduated with the cand.jur. degree at the Royal Frederick University in 1939 and obtained a Master of Business Administration degree at Harvard Business School in 1941. He was called to the bar in Norway in 1952.

He briefly served as a deputy judge in his hometown Tønsberg from 1939, until leaving the country for Harvard shortly afterwards. He joined the Norwegian diplomatic service in exile in 1941, and served as a legation secretary at the Norwegian legation in Montreal 1941–1942. He worked as an attaché at the Norwegian Embassy (of the government in exile) in London 1942–1943 and as a secretary in the trade department of the Norwegian Ministry of Foreign Affairs in exile in London 1943–1945. He also received military training in Scotland. He was legation secretary and vice consul in London 1945–1948. He was also the Norwegian representative to several international organisations which later merged to form the United Nations Economic Commission for Europe. In 1948 he was legation secretary in Bern and Vienna.

He was a manager in Norsk Hydro 1950–1952 and became sales director for cellulose at Borregaard in 1952. In 1969 he became managing director of Press Paper Ltd. in London, the main representative in the United Kingdom of Norwegian and Swedish pulp and paper companies. He was a member of the board of directors of several companies.

A member of the Paus family, he was a son of the surgeon and President of the Norwegian Red Cross Nikolai Nissen Paus. He was a grandson of the theologian Bernhard Pauss and of the colonel and noted freemason Vilhelm Christian Marius Ødegaard. He was married to Anne Collett (1918–2008), daughter of estate owner Axel Collett. His brother, the surgeon and Grand Master of the Norwegian Order of Freemasons Bernhard Paus, was married to Anne's sister Brita Collett.

He was a member of Norske Selskab from 1954, and of the Norwegian Order of Freemasons.
