= Hans Thoresen =

Norwegian businessman (1767–1840)

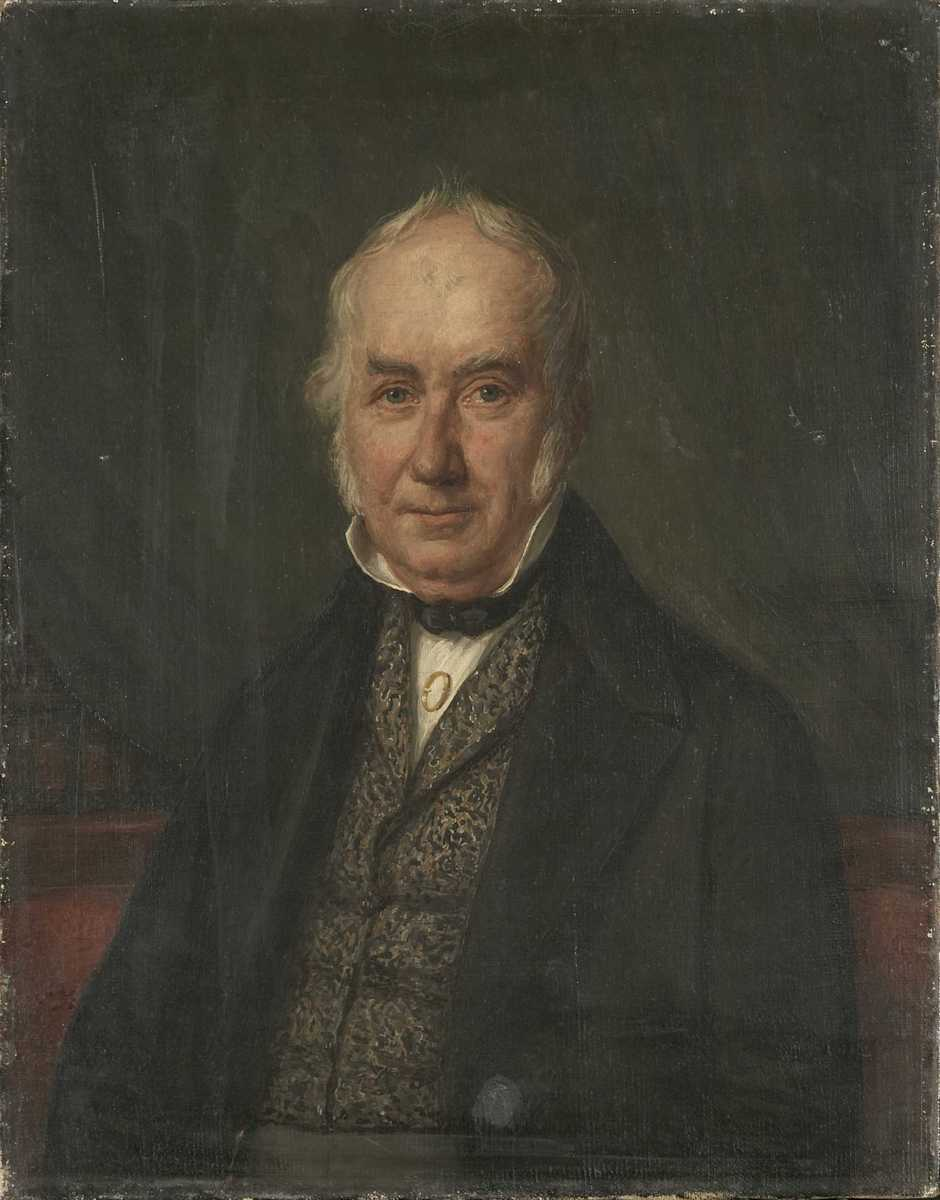
Hans Thoresen, painted by Johan Gørbitz in 1839

Hans Thoresen (1767 – 1840) was a Norwegian timber merchant and ship-owner in Christiania (now Oslo), Norway. He became a burgher in Christiania in 1790 and built a large timber business in the city.

He was born at Degrum in the parish of Enebakk in Akershus, Norway. He was a well known public figure in Christiania during his lifetime. He bought the Sommerro estate from Bernt Anker, now part of the grounds surrounding the Norwegian Royal Palace in Oslo. In 1810, he bought Skinderstuen where the Norwegian Nobel Institute is found today.

He married Anna Ramstad on 17 February 1816 in Christiania. Their daughter Augusta (1822–1875) married Lutheran theologian, Bernhard Cathrinus Pauss during 1865 in Geneva.

A painting of him from 1839 by Johan Gørbitz is owned by Oslo Museum.

He should not be confused with timber merchant in Christiania Hans Thorn Thoresen (1761–1823).
