= Pauspur =

- Village
- Interactive map of Pauspur
- Country: India
- State: Assam
- District: Kokrajhar
- Time zone: UTC+05:30 (IST)

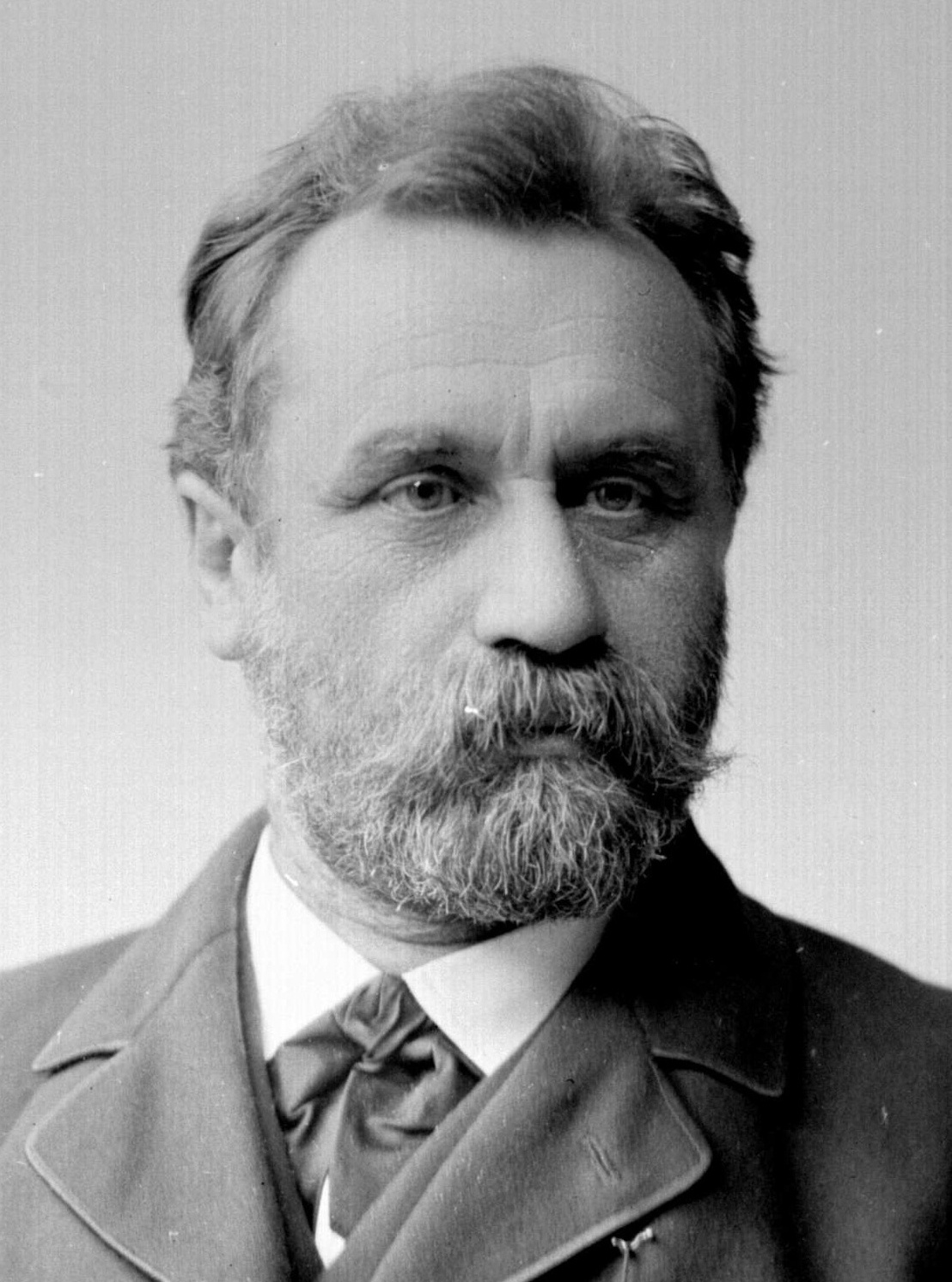
Bernhard Pauss, for whom the village was named

Pauspur is a village in the state of Assam in India, located to the south of the Mornai Tea Estate within Kokrajhar district. It had its own Lutheran congregation and church, Pauspur Church. A small church was built 1919–1920 and replaced by a larger church in 1939. Pauspur Church was closed in 1951, as religious services were moved to a new church in Dingdinga.

== History ==
It was built just outside Mornai Tea Estate at the colony's southern border in the late 19th century by missionaries affiliated with the Santal Mission of the Northern Churches. The village of Pauspur is mentioned as early as 1896. The village was named in honour of Bernhard Pauss (whose last name is also spelled Paus), the chairman of the Norwegian Santal Mission, and thus consists of the Norwegian family name Paus and the Sanskrit suffix pur, meaning "city" or "settlement." The village's name was usually spelled Pauspur, although its namesake Bernhard Pauss used a different spelling of his last name.

A map including the village's location is included in the book Santalmisjonens historie. Pauspur is located around 40 kilometres to the south of Bhutan and around 25 kilometres to the north of Bangladesh.

=== Pauspur Church ===
The village had its own Bengali-language Protestant church. The Bengali-speaking Christians of the colony lived mainly in Pauspur or Bijoepur. In 1919 services were held in a buffalo stable in Pauspur. The 1919–1920 annual report of the Santal Mission of the Northern Churches noted that "as we have some Christians of different races in Pauspur we got a small church built for worship in the Bengali language. But we placed it close to the southern boundary of the Colony in order that it might become the starting point for work outside. Though we have not seen much fruit in that direction yet, I am glad to tell that the Rajbongsis call it 'our church.'" Santalen also mentioned the small church in Pauspur in 1921. A new, larger church in Pauspur was completed in 1939. However, in 1951, Pauspur church was closed and religious services were moved to a newly completed church in Dingdinga.
