= Fegth =

Fegth is a Norwegian surname. Notable people with the surname include:

- Hannibal Fegth (1879–1967), Norwegian rower
- Jacob Fegth (1761–1834), Norwegian merchant and ship-owner

== See also ==
- Feith
