= Olav Hodne =

Norwegian humanitarian and missionary (1921–2009)

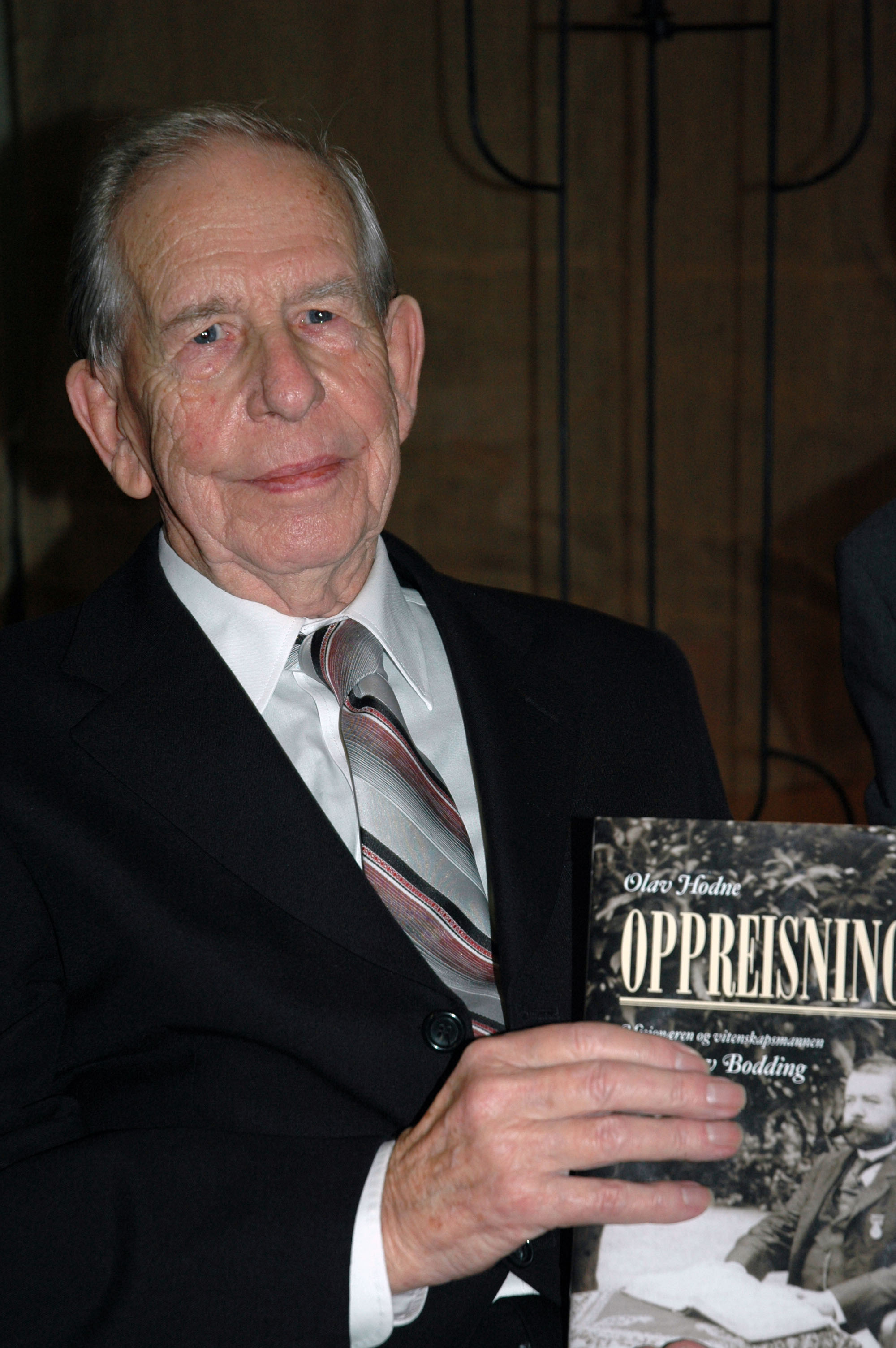
- Hoden in 2006
- Born: 16 June 1921; Lindås, Hordaland, Norway
- Died: 29 October 2009 (aged 88)
- Employer: Norwegian Santal Mission
- Organization: Cooch Behar Refugee Service
- Awards: Nansen Refugee Award (1976)

Olav Hodne (16 June 1921 – 29 October 2009) was a Norwegian humanitarian and missionary, affiliated with the Norwegian Santal Mission.

He was awarded the Nansen Refugee Award in 1976.

== Early life and education ==
Hodne was born at Lindås Municipality in Hordaland, Norway. He was raised in Bergen where he took his examen artium in 1941. He attended a missionary school in Stavanger from which he graduated in 1946.

== Career ==
After graduation, Hodne was employed by the Norwegian Santal Mission (Den norske Santalmisjon) and sent to India in 1948.

In 1972, he became the founder and director of initially the Cooch Behar Refugee Service extended to support refugees during the Bangladesh War of Independence. Following the war, Olav Hodne was instrumental in the founding of Rangpur Dinapur Relief Service. The organization was created in order to give aid to the refugees returning to the Rangpur District and Dinajpur District of northwest Bangladesh. This evolved into a rehabilitation, then a large and progressive development programme RDRS Bangladesh, Bangladesh. He was also instrumental in founding the Lutheran World Federation programmes in India that responded to drought and floods.

== Honours ==
Hodne received an Honorary Doctorate in Theology from the University of Oslo in 1967. In 1976, he received the Nansen Refugee Award from the United Nations High Commissioner for Refugees. In 1983 he was appointed Commander of the Order of St. Olav. He was awarded the Wittenberg Award in 2005 by the Luther Institute for his outstanding service to church and society.

== Selected works ==
- The Seed Bore Fruit: A Short History of the Santal Mission of the Northern Churches 1867-1967 (1967)
- Oppreisning: misjonæren og vitenskapsmannen Paul Olav Bodding 1865-1938 (2006)
