= Rånåsfoss =

- Village
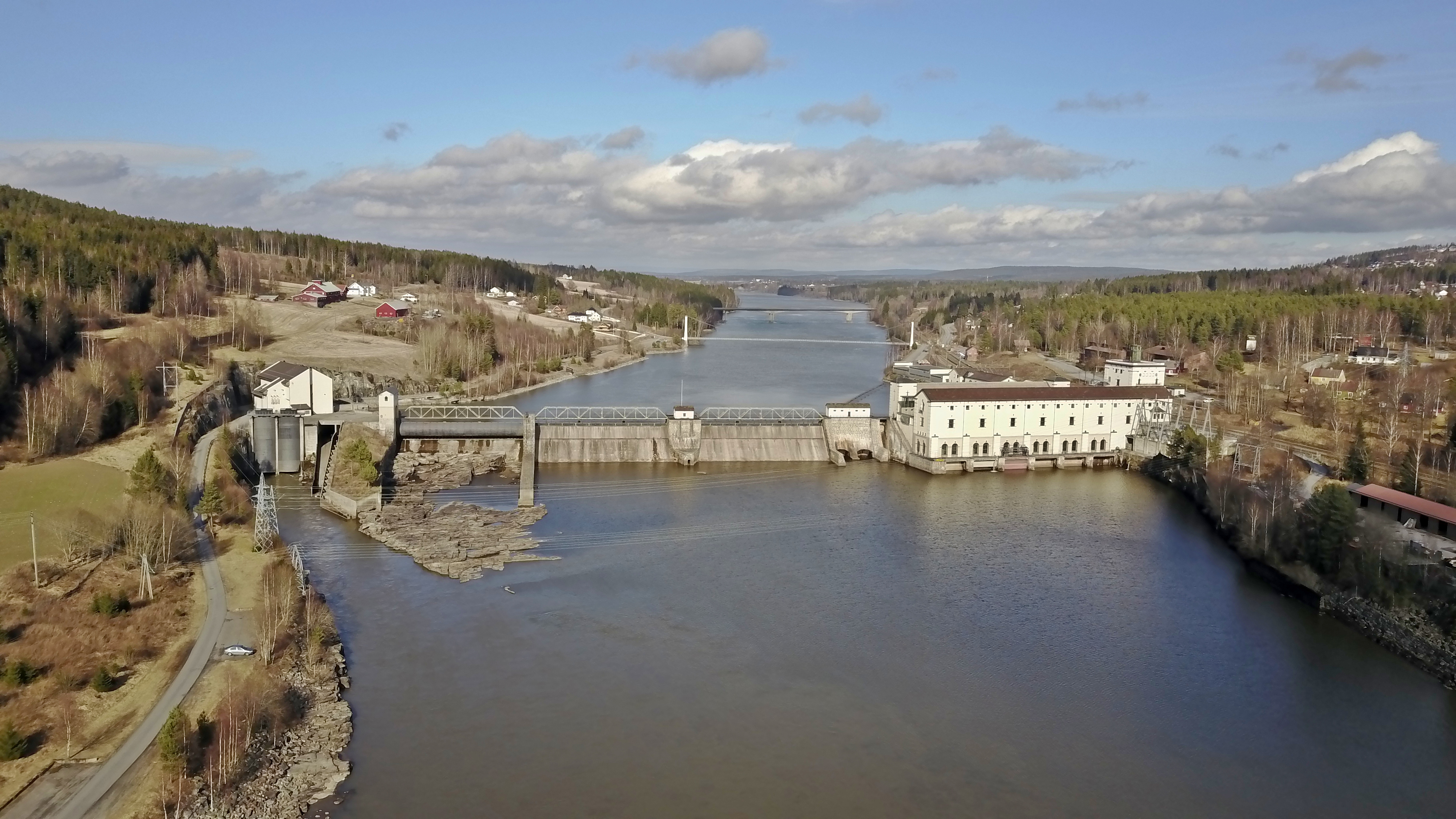
- Rånåsfoss powerstation

- Location in Akershus
- Coordinates: 60°02′N 11°20′E
- Country: Norway
- Region: Østlandet
- County: Akershus
- Municipality: Nes
- Time zone: UTC+01:00 (CET)
  - Summer (DST): UTC+02:00 (CEST)

Rånåsfoss is a village in Nes, Akershus, Norway on the Glomma River. The village was developed in the early 20th century to meet the power needs of Akershus County.

== Power plants ==
The town has multiple power plants.

Construction on the oldest began in 1918 and was completed when the dam first supplied power to a generator in December 1921. It boasted the largest "section shutters" in Europe at the time at 50 meters. It was designed by architects Thorvald Astrup and Otto V. Juell in the neoclassical style. Now known as Rånåsfoss I, the power plant was considered a significant cultural achievement at the time and now "has status as a state-listed cultural monument in Norwegian power production." Some buildings that were meant to temporarily house workers—1,200 at its peak—still exist. It was decommissioned in 2014.

A new dam, Rånåsfoss II, was designed by Knut Nergaard in 1983 and features a flume for log floating and a fish ladder.

Rånåsfoss III was completed in 2016.

== Hiking and sites ==
A 4.2 mile "Cultural Trail" leads from Bingsfoss to Rånåsfoss, which showcases the town's dam as well as a nearby waterfall and beach and fishing opportunities.
