= Nikolaj Nissen =

Danish judge (1627–1684)

Nikolaj Nissen (born 29 May 1627 at Oldemorstoft, died 19 April 1684 in Hamburg), also spelled Nicolai Nissen or Nicolaus Nissen, was a Danish judge and estate owner. He served as war commissioner of Jylland, and was appointed a high court judge in 1680, residing in Viborg. He owned the ancestral Vestre Oldemorstoft estate in Southern Jutland as well as the estates Lerbæk and Rugballegaard.

He was a member of the Nissen family of estate owners from Southern Jutland. His paternal 3rd great-grandfather Henrik (Henrich, Hinrich) Lorentzen (Schack) had received the Oldemorstoft estate as a fief from John, King of Denmark, and King Christian IV of Denmark was a guest at Oldemorstoft several times in his youth.

He was married to Magdalene Boysen (1644–1676), a granddaughter of Flensburg burgomaster Johannes Boysen and a 2nd great-granddaughter of the prominent Reformation-era jurist and statesman Christian Beyer. They were the parents of war commissioner, councillor of state and estate owner Herman Lorentz von Nissen (1663–1717), who was ennobled by letters patent in 1710, of war commissioner and estate owner Nicolai Nissen (1664–1717), and of Magdalene Catharina Nissen (born 1665), who married Jacob von Holten. Herman Lorentz von Nissen was married to Ida Sophie Amalie Glud (1672–1703), daughter of Viborg bishop Søren Glud (ennobled 1679) and Ida Christine Moth, a sister of the King's mistress Sophie Amalie Moth. Nikolaj Nissen was the grandfather of, among others, supreme court justice, governor of Tranquebar and governor of Copenhagen Christian Ulrich von Nissen-Benzon, of major-general Christian Siegfried von Nissen-Benzon, and of governor of Saint Croix Gregers Høeg Nissen.

Numerous of his descendants have been named for him, for example, the Norwegian humanitarian Nikolai Nissen Paus.
