= Hartvig Lassen =

Norwegian editor, educator and literary historian

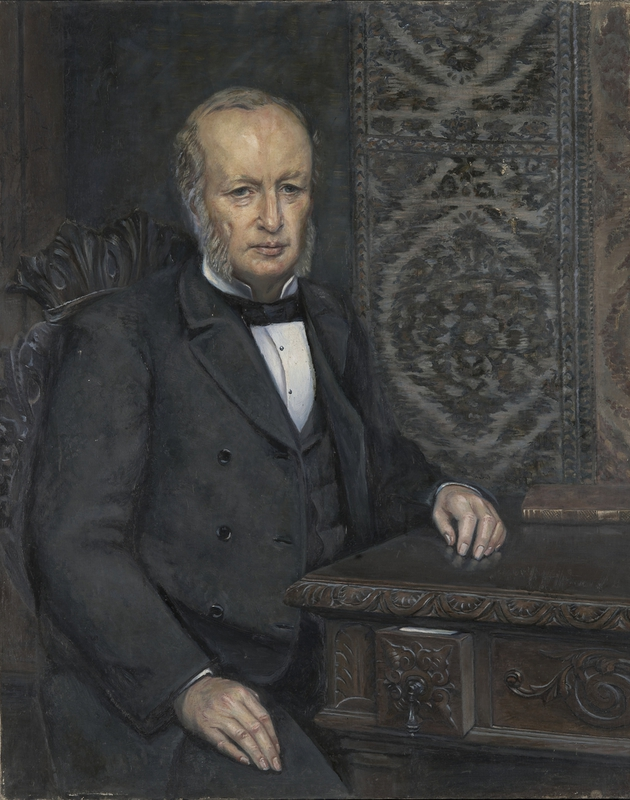
Hartvig Lassen

Hartvig Marcus Lassen (9 August 1824 – 9 August 1897) was a Norwegian editor, educator and literary historian.

== Personal life ==
He was born in Bergen, Norway as a son of police chief and burgomaster Albert Lassen (1783–1860) and his wife Abigael Vogt Monrad (1792–1861). He was a nephew of professor Christian Lassen (1800–1876). He attended Bergen Cathedral School and graduated from the University of Christiania in 1843.

== Career ==
From 1852, he was a teacher at Hartvig Nissen School in Christiania (now Oslo). He edited the magazines Skilling-Magazin from 1857 to 1891, Folkevennen from 1868 to 1897 and Folkebladet from 1891 to 1896. He was also known for publishing the complete works of Henrik Wergeland, in nine volumes between 1852 and 1857. In 1866 he issued the biography Henrik Wergeland og hans Samtid. This was the first Wergeland biography. Lassen portrayed Wergeland as a wordsmith first and foremost, not as a liberal political figure.

Lassen died during 1897 in Christiania and was buried at Vår Frelsers gravlund. In 1915, the Hartvig Lassens medalje was established at the University of Oslo for outstanding literary dissertations. The first medals will be awarded in 1919 and the last in 1933.
