= Cemetery of Our Saviour =

Cemetery in Oslo, Norway

Vår Frelsers Gravlund
- Interactive map of Vår Frelsers Gravlund

Details
- Established: 1808
- Location: Gamle Aker, Oslo
- Country: Norway
- Coordinates: 59°55′16″N 10°44′40″E

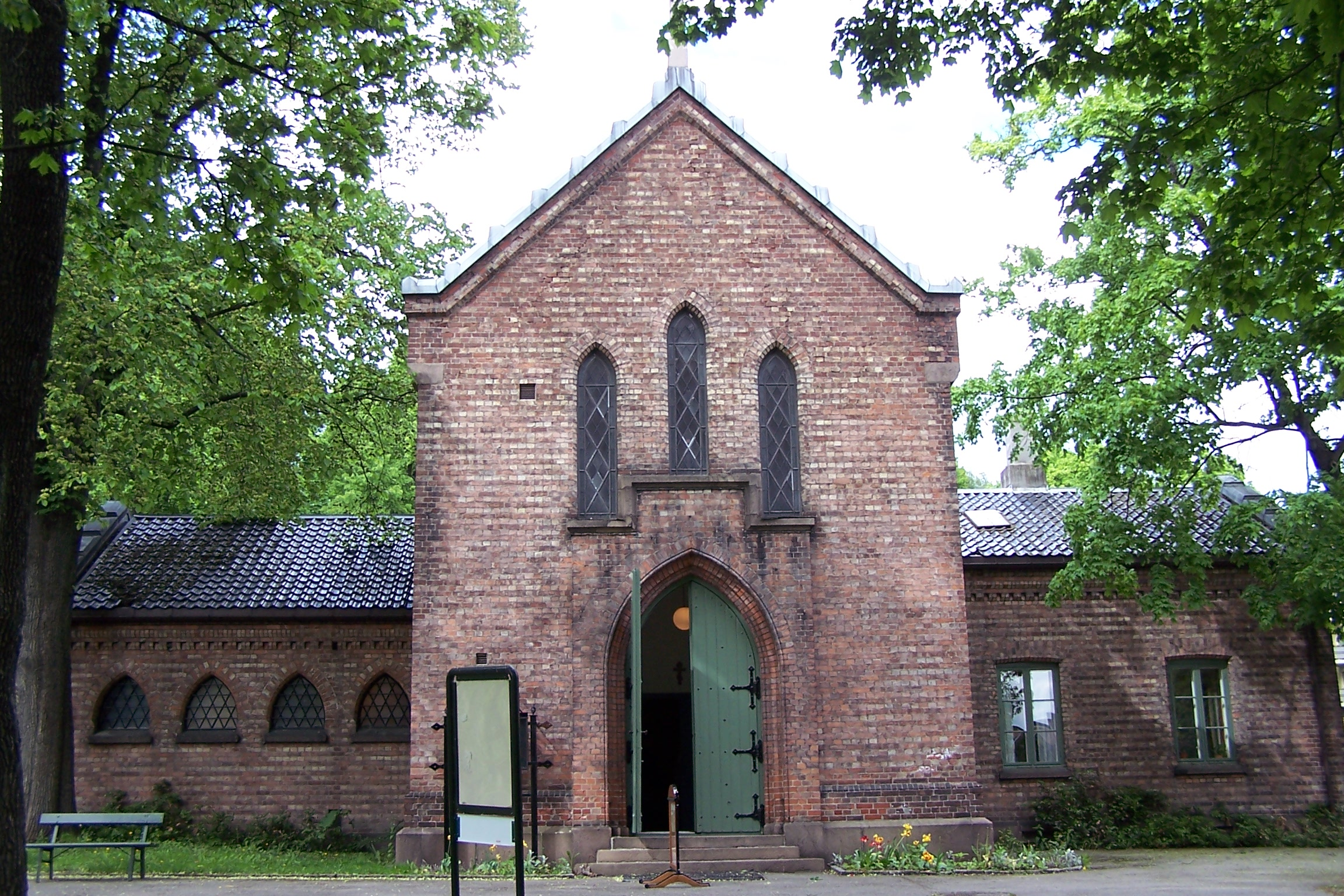
Our Saviour's Orthodox Church, formerly the chapel

The Cemetery of Our Saviour (Norwegian: Vår Frelsers gravlund) is a cemetery in Oslo, Norway, located north of Hammersborg in Gamle Aker district. It is located adjacent to the older Old Aker Cemetery and was created in 1808 as a result of the great famine and cholera epidemic of the Napoleonic Wars. Its grounds were extended in 1911. The cemetery has been full and thus closed for new graves since 1952, with interment only being allowed in existing family graves. The cemetery includes five sections, including Æreslunden, Norway's main honorary burial ground, and the western, southern, eastern and northern sections. The Cemetery of Our Saviour became the preferred cemetery of bourgeois and other upper-class families. It has many grand tombstones and is the most famous cemetery in Norway.

== Notable interments ==
- Ari Behn, writer
- Eivind Astrup, Arctic explorer
- Johan Diederich Behrens, singing teacher and choral conductor
- Christian Birch-Reichenwald, politician
- Bjørnstjerne Bjørnson, writer
- Peder Bjørnson, priest and father of Bjørnstjerne Bjørnson
- Otto Albert Blehr, Prime Minister of Norway
- Carsten Borchgrevink, Anglo-Norwegian polar explorer and leader of the Southern Cross Expedition
- Jens Bratlie, politician
- Anne Brown, soprano singer and actress
- Olaf Bull, poet
- Camilla Collett, writer
- Niels Christian Ditleff, diplomat
- Frederik Due, military officer and statesman
- Birger Eriksen, army officer
- Edward Evans, Royal Navy officer and member of the Terra Nova Expedition
- Thomas Fearnley, painter
- Carl Gustav Fleischer, general
- Hans Gude, painter
- Francis Hagerup, professor, diplomat and politician
- C. J. Hambro, journalist, author and politician
- Aasta Hansteen, painter and early feminist
- Viggo Hansteen, lawyer
- Knut Haukelid, World War II commando
- Henrik Ibsen, playwright
- Lillebil Ibsen, dancer and actress
- Tancred Ibsen, director, screenwriter, World War I pilot
- Gina Krog, suffragist and activist
- Christian Krohg, artist and author
- Bjørg Lødøen, painter
- Sophus Lie, mathematician
- Jorgen Gunnarsson Lovland, Prime Minister of Norway
- Agnes Mowinckel, actress and theatre director
- Edvard Munch, painter
- Rikard Nordraak, composer
- Harald Nørregaard, lawyer, art collector and Chairman of the Norwegian Bar Association
- Sigurd Odland, theologian
- Ole Olsen, musician
- Arnulf Øverland, poet, WWII concentration camp survivor
- Christopher Tostrup Paus, count, papal chamberlain and philanthropist
- Bernhard Pauss, theologian and educator
- Henriette Pauss, teacher, editor, humanitarian and missionary leader
- Alf Prøysen, writer and musician
- Marcus Gjøe Rosenkrantz, government minister
- Hedevig Rosing, author, educator, school founder; first woman to teach in Copenhagen's public schools
- Evald Rygh, banker and politician
- Kirsten Sand, architect
- Christian Homann Schweigaard, lawyer and politician
- Christian August Selmer, politician
- Michael Skjelderup, first Professor of Medicine at the University of Christiania
- Emil Stang, jurist and politician
- Frederik Stang, lawyer, public servant, and politician
- Johannes Steen, politician
- Johan Sverdrup, liberal politician and first Prime Minister of Norway
- Jan Peter Syse, Prime Minister of Norway
- Marcus Thrane, author, journalist, and the leader of the first labour movement in Norway
- Oscar Torp, politician
- Grete Waitz, world champion marathon runner
- Henrik Wergeland, writer
- Rolf Wickstrøm, labour activist
- Gisken Wildenvey, writer

== Gallery ==
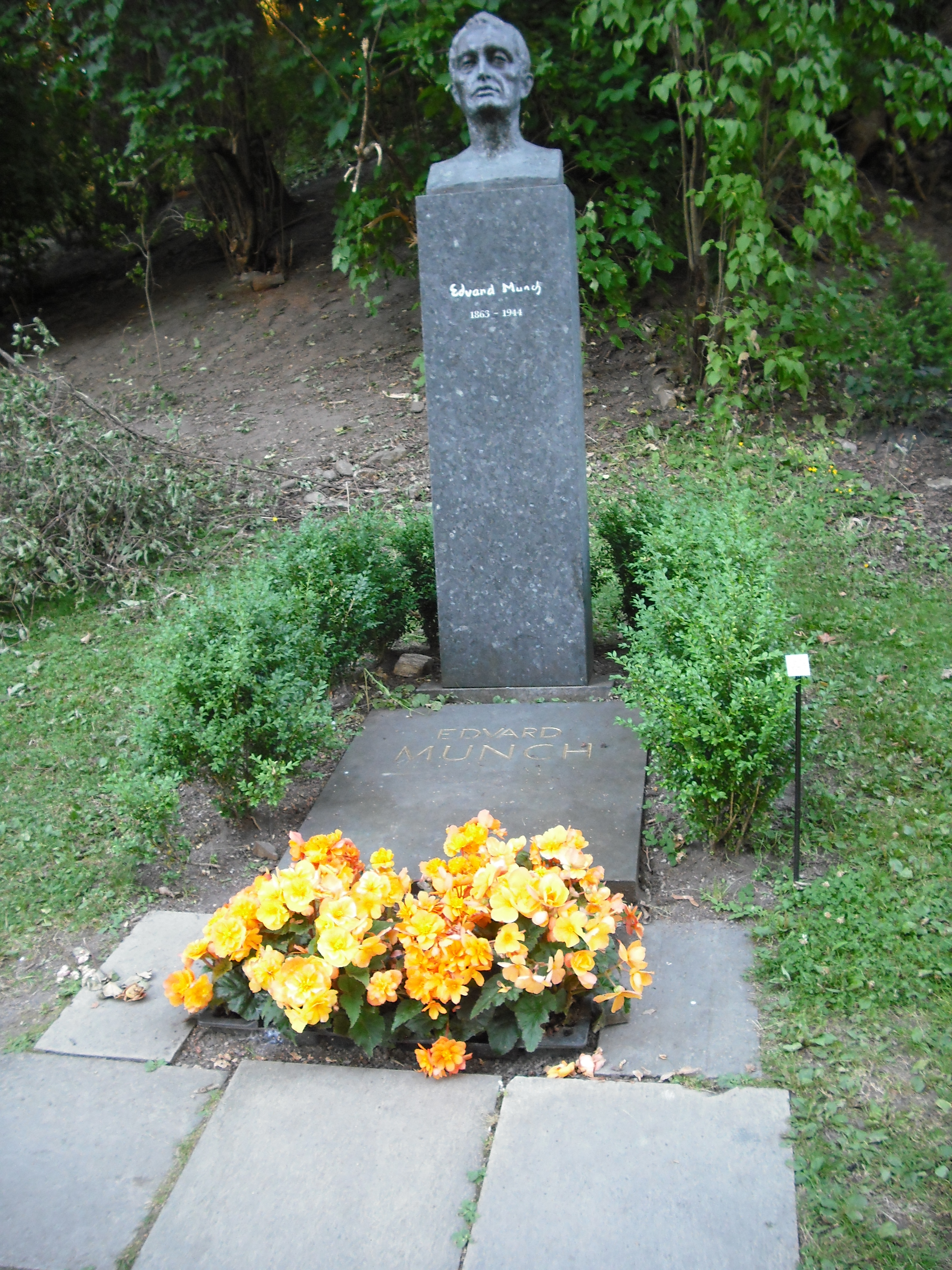
The grave of Edvard Munch

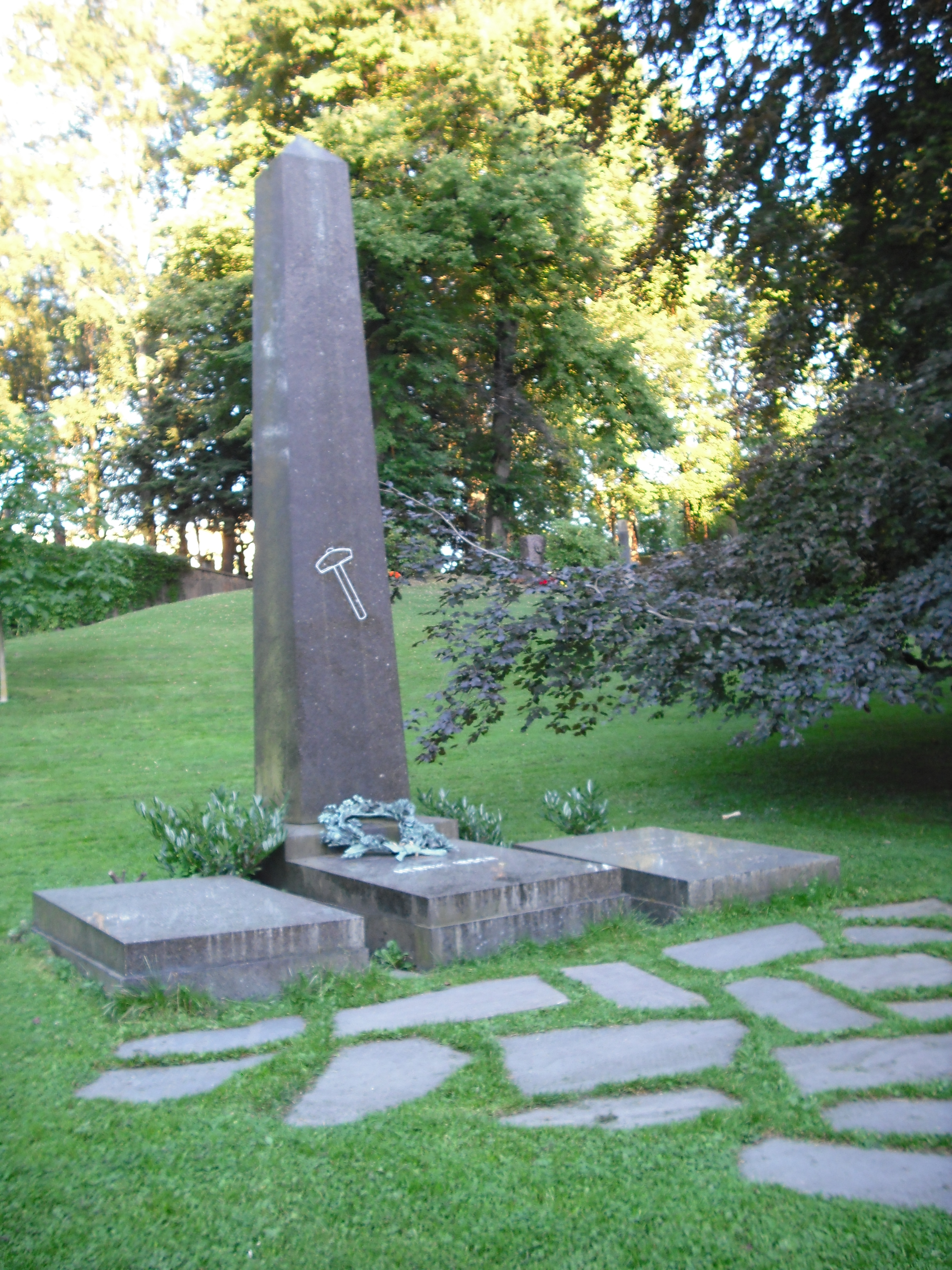
The grave of Henrik Ibsen

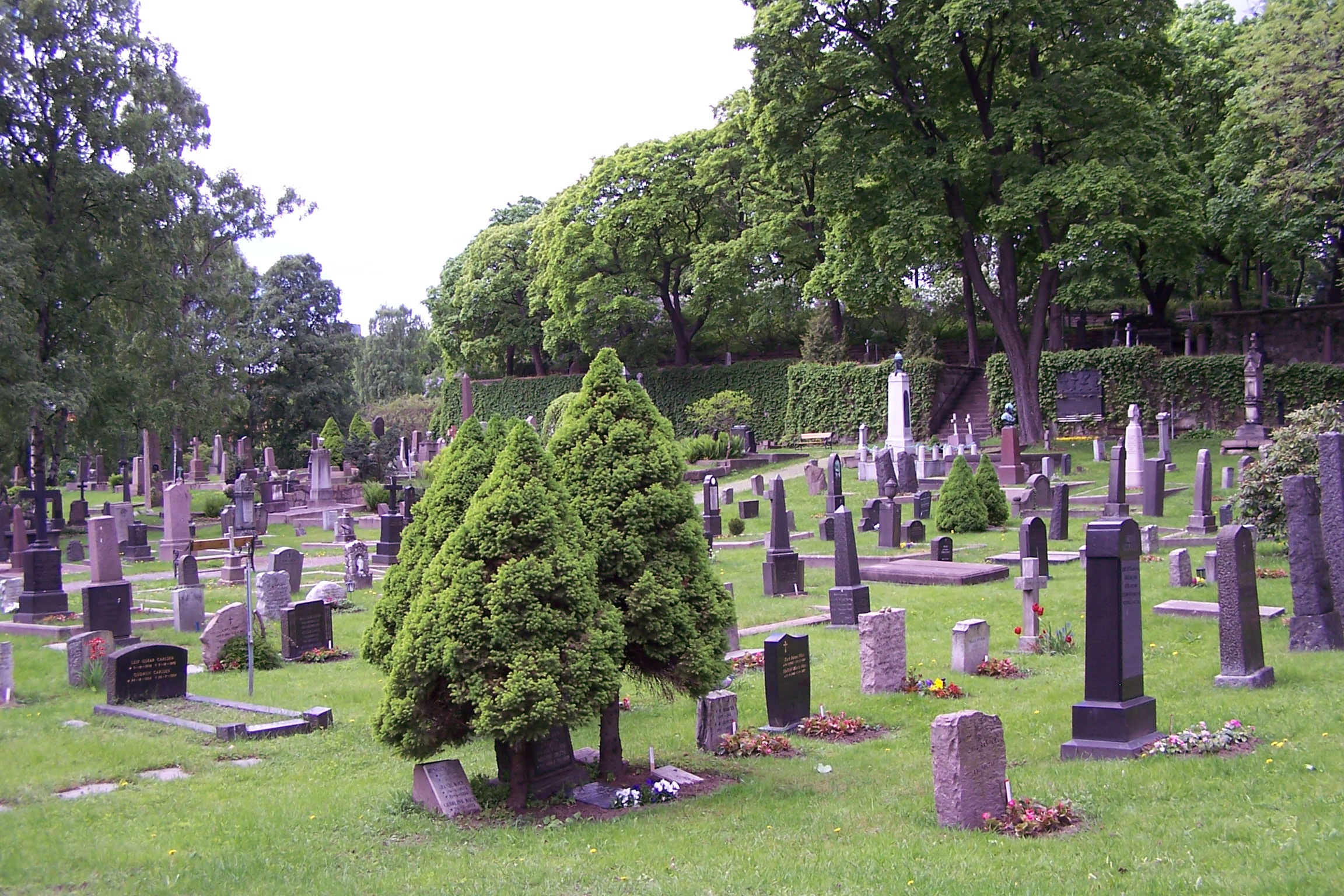
Southern section

Vår Frelsers gravlund in the autumn
