= Krefting =

Krefting is a surname. Notable people with the surname include:

- Anna Krefting (1683-1766), Norwegian businesswoman
- Herman Krefting (1592-1651), Norwegian ironworks pioneer
- Kristian Krefting (1891-1964), Norwegian footballer, military officer, chemical engineer and company owner
- Rudolf Krefting (1860-1942), Norwegian dermatologist
- Ruth Krefting (1900-1987), Norwegian painter and playwright
