= Christiania Burgher School =

Former school in Oslo, Norway

Coordinates: 59.9192°N 10.7532°E

Christiania Burgher School Norwegian: Christiania Borgerskole
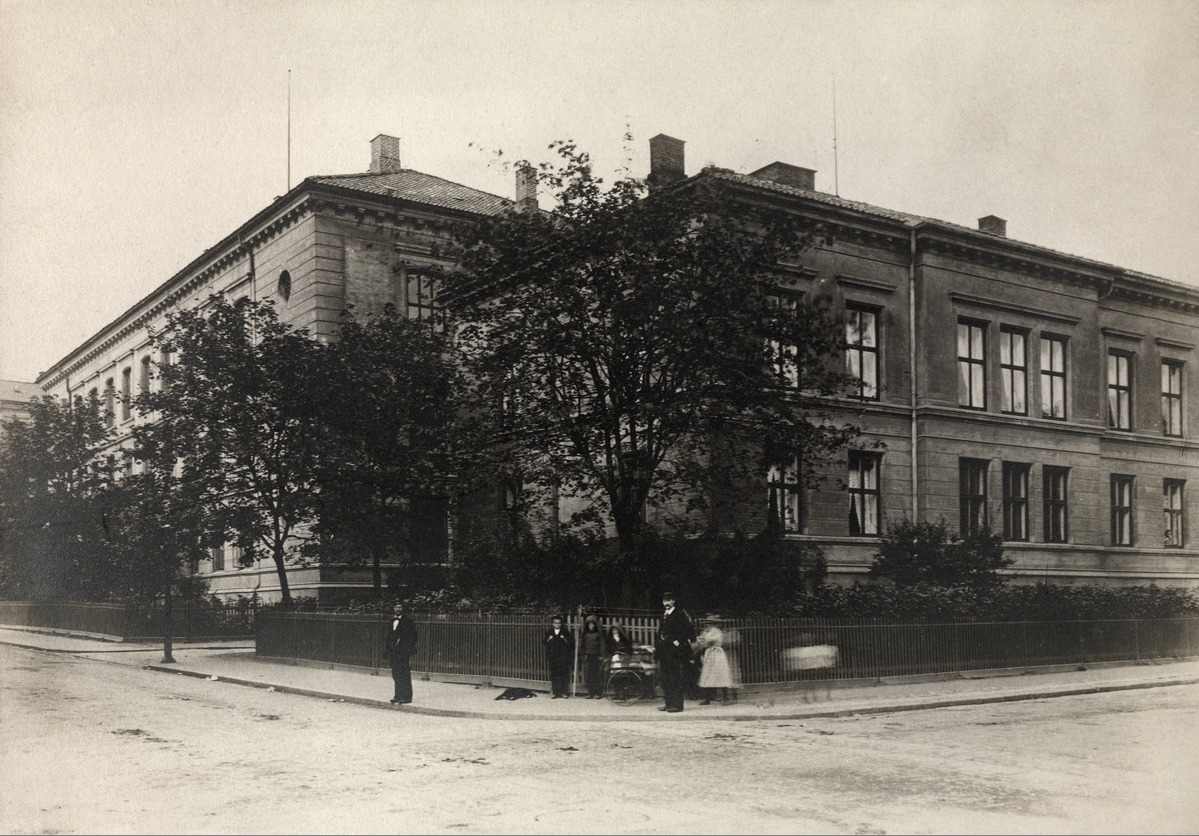

Information
- Established: 1812
- Closed: 1932

Christiania Burgher School (Christiania Borger- og Realskole or Christiania Borgerskole, commonly known as Borgerskolen) was a private middle school in Christiania (now Oslo), Norway. It was founded in 1812 and prepared pupils for enrolment at Oslo Cathedral School.

The school charged tuition throughout the 19th century. In the 20th century the school received municipal subsidies. The school was closed down in 1932.
