= Akershus Energi =

Norwegian power company that produces hydroelectricity

Akershus Energi AS
- Company type: County owned
- Industry: Power
- Founded: 1922
- Headquarters: Sørum, Norway
- Area served: Akershus
- Key people: Jørn Myhrer (CEO); Ivar Ueland (Chairman)
- Products: Hydroelectricity
- Revenue: ▲NOK 838 million (2006)
- Operating income: NOK 608 million (2006)
- Net income: NOK 355 million (2006)
- Number of employees: 24 (2007)
- Parent: Akershus County Municipality
- Website: akershusenergi.no

Akershus Energi is a Norwegian power company that produces hydroelectricity.

== Production ==
Annual production is 2.3 TWh. There are five plants in Glomma, three in Haldensvassdraget, and two in Skiensvassdraget.

== History ==
The company was founded in 1922. Its first managing director was Augustin Paus. The company is wholly owned by Akershus County Municipality.

In 2011, the Nordic Investment Bank reported: "NIB and the Norwegian energy company Akershus Energi have signed a loan totalling NOK 500 million (EUR 63.3 million) for financing the upgrade of two of Akershus Energi's hydropower plants and the construction of a new district heating plant."

In 2016, Akershus Energi bought half of the Nittedal property after Aller Trykk. In June 2017, the Swedish company Infranode bought one third of Akershus Energi Varme AS.

== See also ==
- Hydroelectricity in Norway
