= Karen Wedel-Jarlsberg =

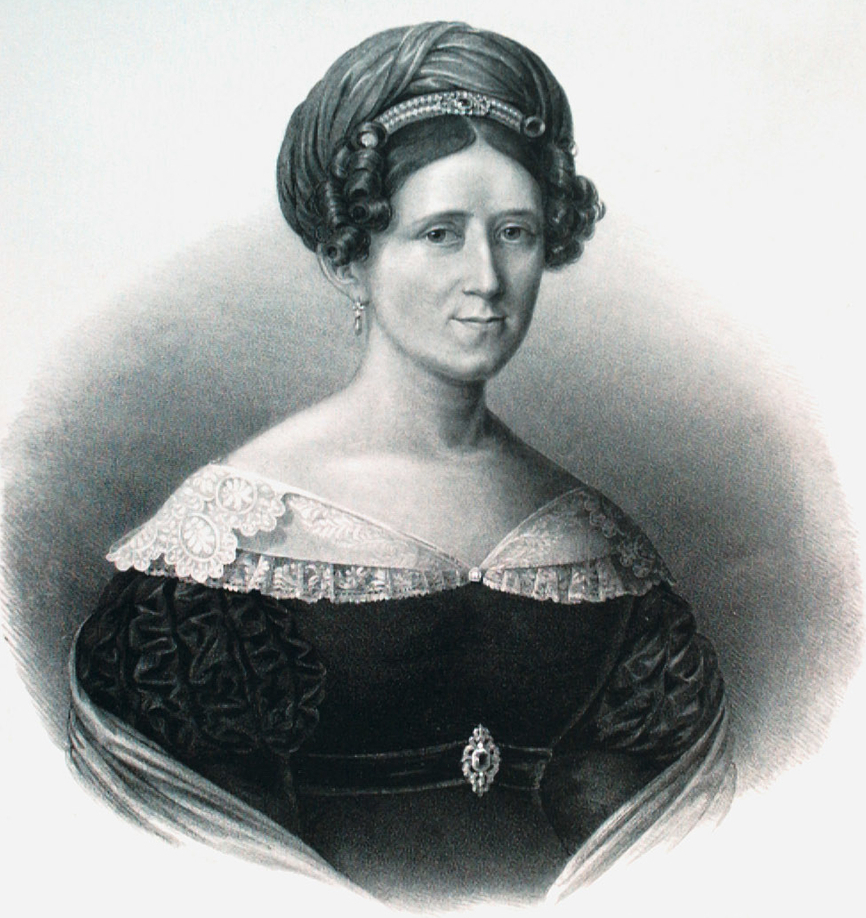
Karen Wedel-Jarlsberg

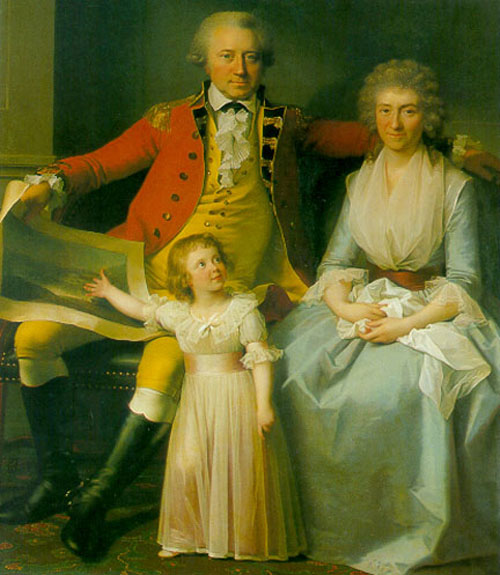
Karen with her parents

Countess Christiane Andrea "Karen" Wedel-Jarlsberg (née Anker; 2 November 1789 – 19 June 1849) was a Norwegian noblewoman and lady-in-waiting.

== Life ==
Wedel-Jarlsberg was born on 2 November 1789, in Christiania (now Oslo), the only surviving child and heir of landowner and prime minister Peder Anker and Anna Elisabeth Cold (1749–1803). She was one of the richest heirs in Norway.

She married count Herman Wedel-Jarlsberg 19 May 1807 on Bogstad. Her spouse was one of the influential Norwegians who supported a union between Norway and Sweden.

=== Court career ===
In 1814, Norway and Sweden were united and shared the same royal house. During the visits of the royal family in Norway, it was to have a separate Norwegian court, who met them at the border and served them during their stay in Norway. Karen Wedel-Jarlsberg was given the task to be the head lady in waiting of the first Norwegian court since the Middle Ages.

From 1817 onward, she served as principal lady-in-waiting to three Swedish-Norwegian queens in succession: Hedwig Elizabeth Charlotte of Holstein-Gottorp, Désirée Clary and Josephine of Leuchtenberg, first with the title hovmastarinna ('Court mistress') and from 1825 as overhoffmesterinne ('Chief court mistress').

Initially, her office was purely honorary, as queen Charlotte never visited Norway. She served for the first time when crown princess Josephine visited Norway in 1824. Queen Desiree mainly stayed in Sweden, but did visit Norway a couple of times between 1827 and 1847. In 1844, Josephine became queen. Wedel-Jarlsberg initially remained in office, but asked to be relieved of her position in 1845.

Wedel-Jarlsberg died on 19 June 1849, in Bogstad gård.

== Sources ==
- Cecilia af Klercker (1942). Hedvig Elisabeth Charlottas dagbok IX (1812–1817). Stockholm: Norstedt & Söners förlag. page 710
- Yngvar Hauge & Nini Egeberg: Bogstad, 1773–1995. H. Aschehoug (1960)

Court offices
| Preceded by - | Overhoffmesterinne to the Queen of Norway (1817) 1825–1845 | Succeeded by Fanny Løvenskiold |
