= Jacob Fegth =

Norwegian shipowner and timber merchant

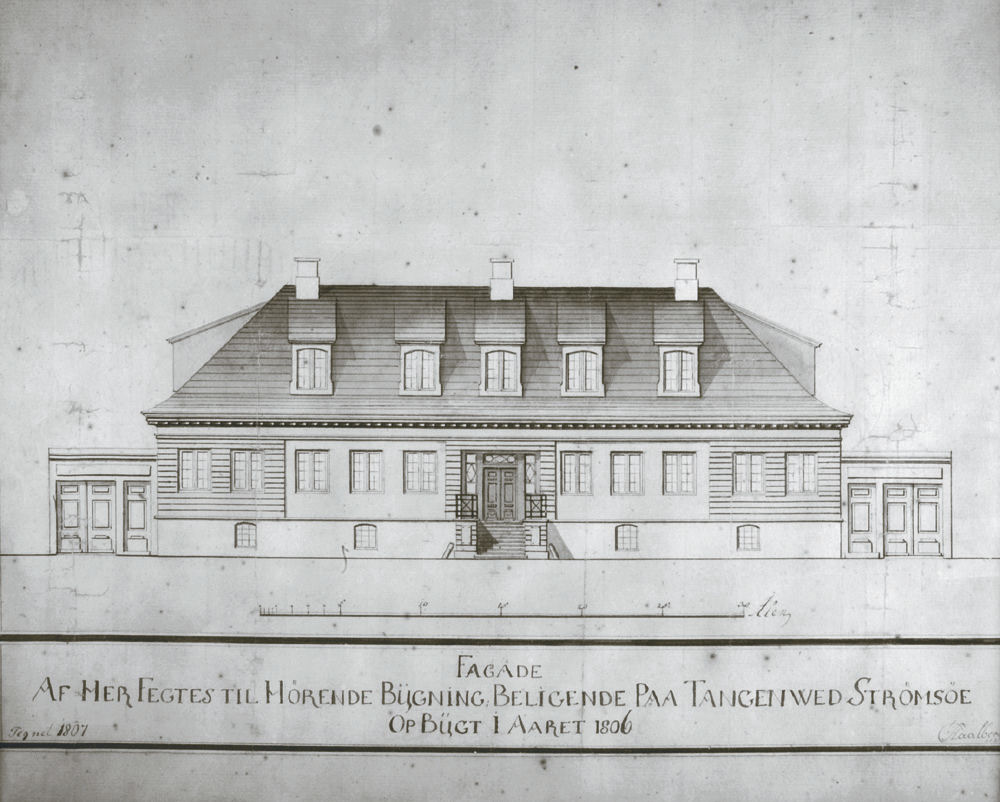
Feghtgården in Havnegaten 10, Tangen, Drammen

Jacob Fegth (also spelled Feght) (born 18 September 1761 at Tangen, Drammen, died 2 October 1834 at Tangen, Drammen) was a Norwegian timber merchant and ship-owner, and one of the largest timber merchants of Drammen in the early 19th century.

He was the son of wigmaker Christian Nicolay Fegth (1722–1766) from Frederikshald, whose family was probably of Dutch origin (the family name might derive from the river Vecht).

The townhouse Feghtgården was built for him in 1806, designed by architect Christian Staalberg. In 1808, he bought the estate Stormoen outside Drammen. He owned several sawmills, a distillery, ships and other properties in Drammen. By the early 19th century, he had become Drammen's third largest timber merchant. He was also Public Guardian (overformynder) of Strømsø from 1802 to 1807. He was one of around fifty prominent private citizens in Norway who contributed funds to the establishment of the Royal Frederick University; he contributed 5,000 Norwegian rigsdaler.

He was the father-in-law of ship owner and estate owner Anders Juel (1787–1852), ship's captain and privateer Bent Salvesen (1787–1820) and ship owner Mathias Andreas Holst (1793–1849). He has descendants with names including Fegth, Juel, Salvesen, Holst, Paus, Høeg, Prytz, Browne, Kapteijn, Løvenskiold, Wessel, and other names.
