= Norwegian Santal Mission =

The Norwegian Santal Mission (Norwegian: Den norske Santalmisjon) was a Norwegian humanitarian and missionary organisation that was mainly active in India, particularly among the Santhal people. It was affiliated with the (Lutheran) Norwegian State Church and existed from 1867 until it merged with other organisations to form Normisjon in 2001. The Norwegian Santal Mission has operated schools and hospitals in India and Bhutan.

The organisation was the Norwegian branch of the Santal Mission of the Northern Churches, that was established by the Norwegian missionary Lars Olsen Skrefsrud and the Danish missionary Hans Peter Børresen. Similar organisations existed in Denmark, Sweden, the United Kingdom and the United States. Notable people affiliated with the Norwegian Santal Mission include Olav Hodne.

Between 1883 and 2001, the Norwegian Santal Mission published the journal Santalen ("The Santal").

== Chairmen ==
Prior to 1883, the Norwegian Santal Mission consisted of local committees and lacked a national leadership. In 1883, a national central committee was formed. It was replaced by a national board from 1911. The chairmen were (incomplete):

- 1883–1887 Oscar Nissen
- 1887–1907 Bernhard Pauss
- 1911–1912 Joh. Baklund
- 1912–1917 Ole Hallesby
- Hans Høeg
