= Gustav Borgen =

Norwegian photographer

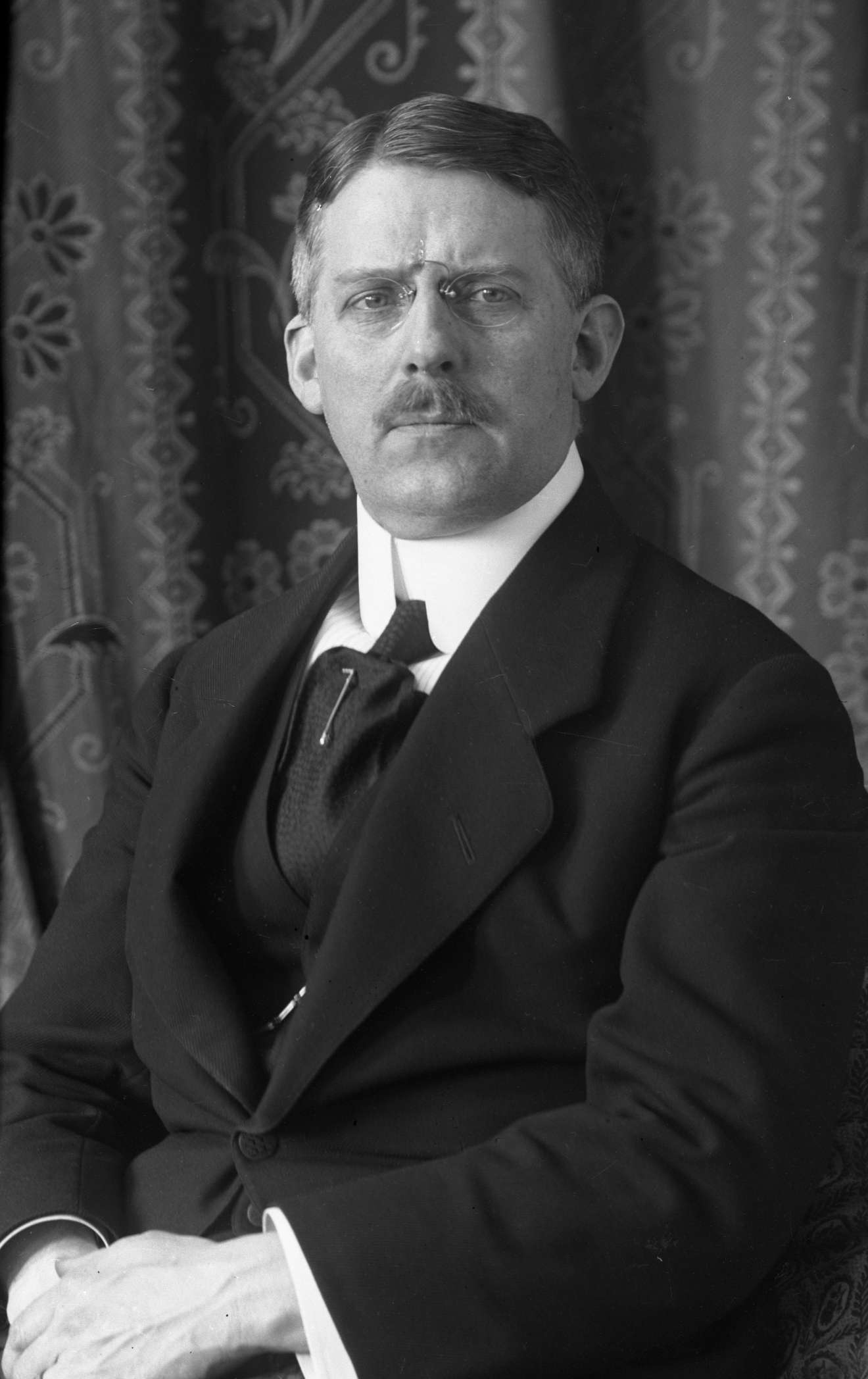
A 1915 self-portrait.

Gustav Borgen (10 June 1865 – 16 August 1926) was a Norwegian photographer. He is well known for his portraits of many prominent Norwegians from the period 1891–1922, including King Haakon VII of Norway, Henrik Ibsen and Bjørnstjerne Bjørnson, and numerous cabinet ministers, members of parliament, writers and artists, and members of upper bourgeois families. His collection of around 60,000 photographs is in the public domain and has been made available by Digitalt Museum (Digital Museum).
