= Theodor Haagaas =

Norwegian mathematician and private school owner

Theodor Christian Petersen Haagaas
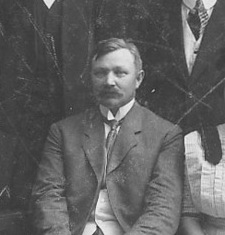
- Theodor Haagaas, 1911
- Born: 15 June 1873; Tistedalen
- Died: 25 December 1961 (aged 88); Oslo
- Resting place: Vestre gravlund 59.931924°N 10.701681°E
- Occupations: Mathematics educator and private school owner
- Awards: King's Medal of Merit in Gold (1949)

Theodor Christian Petersen Haagaas (15 June 1873, Tistedalen – 25 December 1961, Oslo) was a Norwegian mathematician, mathematics educator and private school owner.

He was the founder and owner of the Haagaas School, a private gymnasium at Frogner, Oslo that existed 1915–1955. Haagaas School was Norway's best known intensive gymnasium or "student factory" (Norwegian: studentfabrikk) in the first half of the 20th century, in the tradition of the historical Heltberg School of the 19th century; the noted educator Mosse Jørgensen wrote that "if any school had deserved the epithet 'The New Heltberg', it was Haagaas School." He was also a co-owner of Frogner School and Nissen's Girls' School, and taught mathematics at Frogner School for nearly half a century. He was the author of the widely used Haffner og Haagaas series of textbooks in mathematics, which was published between 1925 and 1979 in dozens of editions and which was the most widely used series of mathematics textbooks in Norway for a large part of the 20th century.

He was described as a distinctive and unconventional teacher with a keen sense of humor, and as the country's best-known mathematics educator. Upon his passing, he was described by Aftenposten as "a very widely known Norwegian educator." He received the King's Medal of Merit in Gold in 1949 for his services to education in Norway. Among his four daughters was the humanist and resistance fighter Henriette Bie Lorentzen.

== Background ==
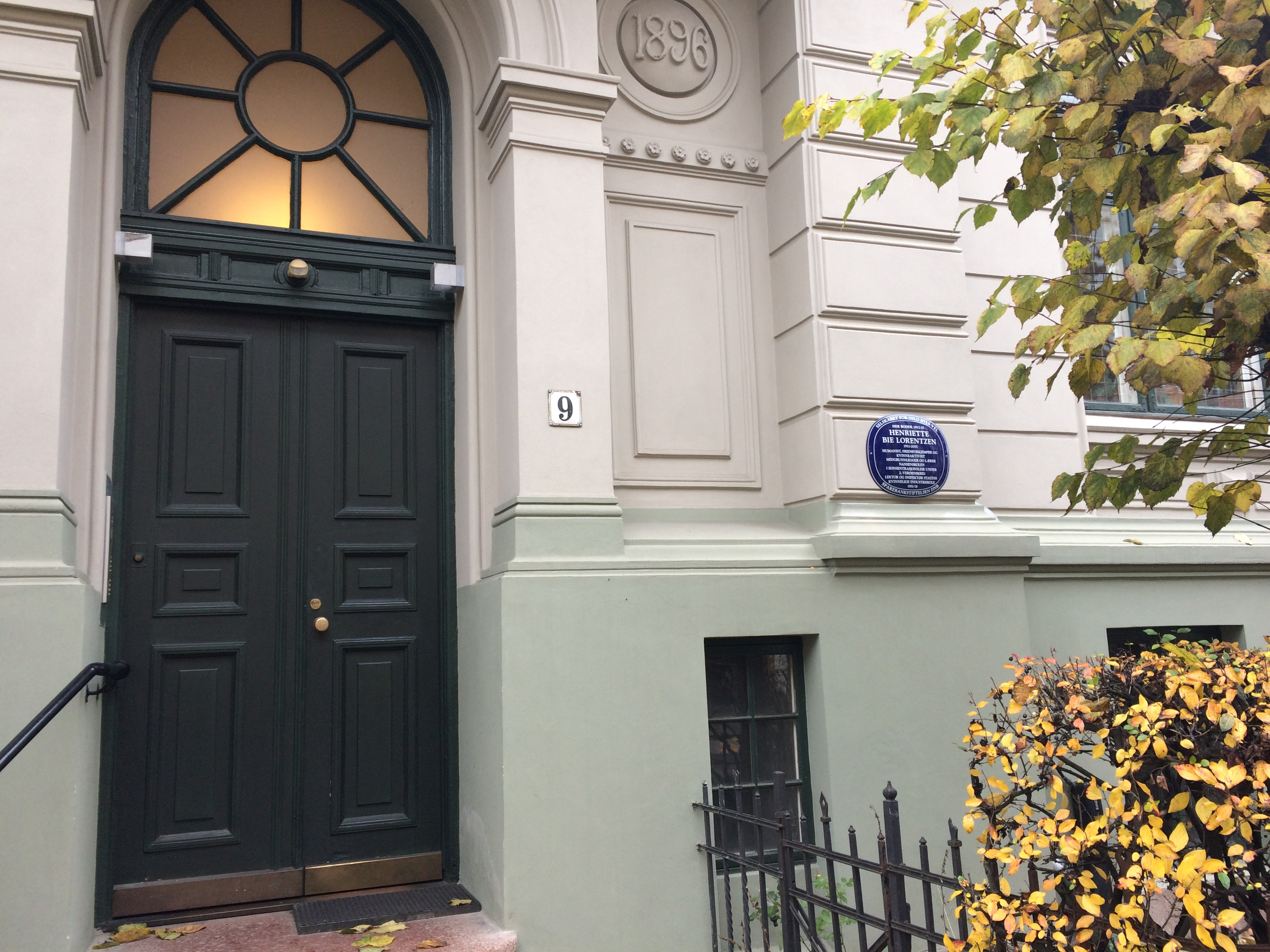
A blue plaque, placed by Oslo Byes Vel, commemorates his daughter Henriette Bie Lorentzen at Riddervolds gate 9, where the family lived from 1912

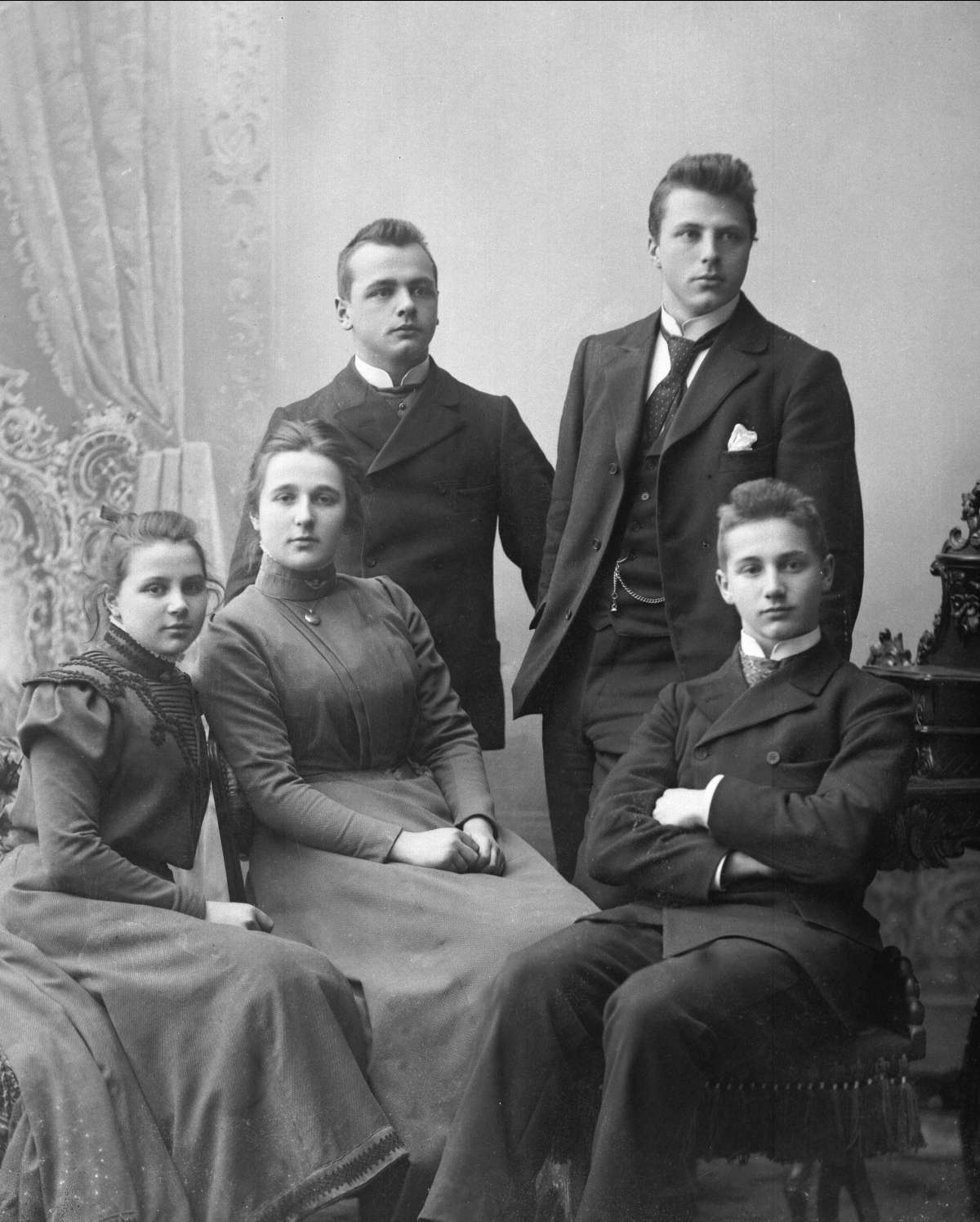
His wife Henriette (second from left) with her siblings Louise, Augustin, Nikolai and George, photographed by Gustav Borgen

He grew up in Tistedalen outside Frederikshald. His father Theodor Christian Haagaas (1823–1899) was the sawmill director (1862–1892) of Norway's largest timber company, Saugbrugsforeningen, and a shipowner; the elder Theodor was born on the farm Haagaas (from Old Norse Haukáss, "hawk hill") in Trøgstad, which his family had owned at least since 1555. His mother Nora was born in Norway to Swedish immigrant parents of Forest Finnish heritage, and died early. His father later lived at Veden Manor, which had previously belonged to Theodor's maternal grandfather. Theodor Haagaas was one of the pioneers of skiing in Tistedalen around 1885–1886.

In 1908 he married his former pupil Henriette Wegner Paus (1879–1942), a university-educated teacher at Nissen's Girls' School. She was the daughter of Bernhard Pauss and Henriette Pauss (née Wegner), major figures in the development of girls' education in Norway and long-time owners and leaders of Nissen's Girls' School, and the granddaughter of the mining magnate Benjamin Wegner and the banking heir and philanthropist Henriette Wegner. His wife was a goddaughter of Wilhelm Adelsten Maribo. Theodor and Henriette were the parents of four daughters, among them the journalist, humanist and resistance fighter Henriette Bie Lorentzen (née Henriette Wegner Haagaas). A blue plaque, placed by Oslo Byes Vel, commemorates his daughter Henriette at Riddervolds gate 9, where the family lived from 1912.

He was the uncle of the publisher Henrik Groth and the brother-in-law of Nikolai Nissen Paus, George Wegner Paus and Augustin Paus.

== Career ==
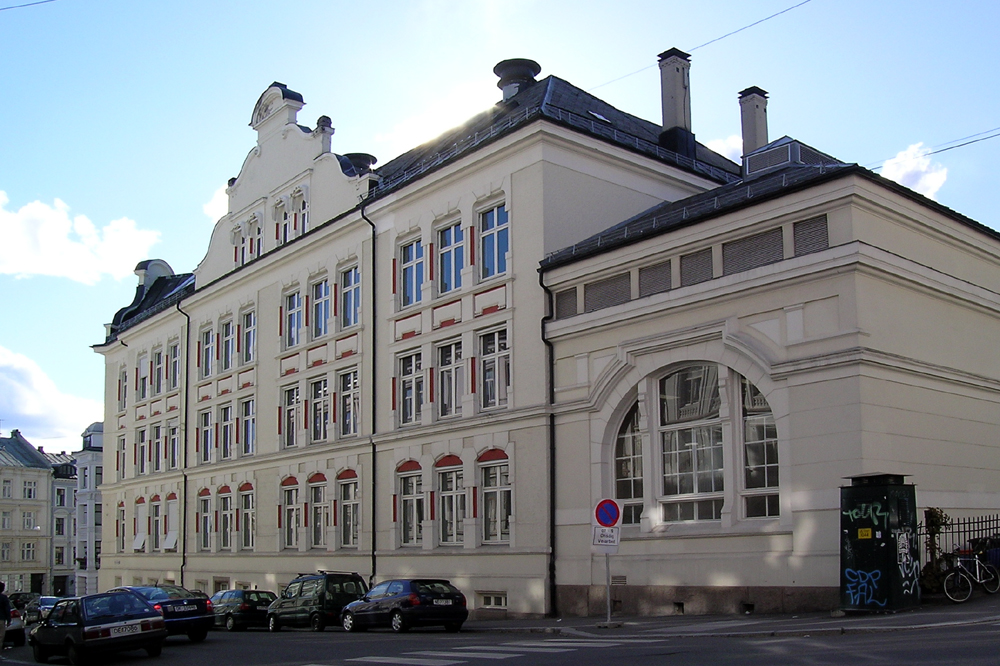
The shared building of Frogner School and Haagaas School at Frogner, Oslo

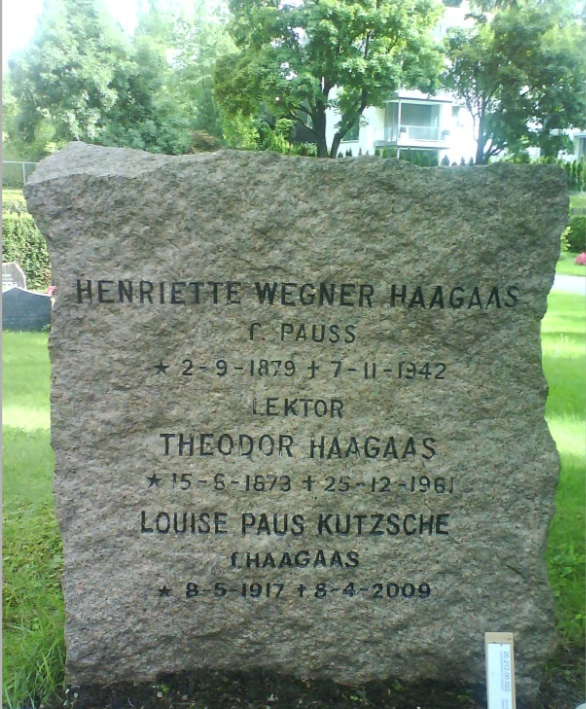
Grave at Vestre gravlund

He attended the Frederikshald Gymnasium and graduated with the examen artium university entrance exam in 1891. He subsequently studied philosophy, mathematics, natural sciences and law at the Royal Frederick University. He also served as a lieutenant in the Royal Norwegian Navy 1898–1902.

From 1900 he was a lecturer in mathematics at the private gymnasium Frogner School in Oslo. In 1911 he became a member of the management of the school and in 1913 he became one of the school's co-owners. At the time Frogner School's neighbour, the Nissen's Girls' School, was also owned by Frogner School, although they operated as separate schools. He and the other owners sold both schools to Christiania municipality in 1918 and continued to manage them until 1919. In 1917 he was appointed by the King-in-Council as a lecturer at Drammen Higher School, and took office in 1918. In 1920 he left this position to become a lecturer at Frogner School again.

In 1915 he founded Haagaas School, a private gymnasium in Oslo that existed until 1955, and was the school's headmaster until 1946. Haagaas School was the last school in Norway in the tradition of the Heltberg School of the 19th century, offering a fast track to the examen artium (a so-called studentfabrikk, "student factory" or intensive gymnasium). The noted educator Mosse Jørgensen wrote that "if any school had deserved the epithet 'The New Heltberg', it was Haagaas School." According to his former pupil Harald Throne-Holst, Haagaas was characterized by a "strong and active sense of humor." The journal Den høgre skolen (The Higher School) noted that:

Throughout his teaching career, he worked primarily at Frogner School in Oslo, where he was a central and unifying figure ... his main subject was mathematics. All of his students remember him as an outstanding teacher; they feared and loved him, and they reveled in his incomparable humor. He must have been the ideal math teacher. He possessed great authority, was conscientious and meticulous, practical and down-to-earth, patient, clear, and concise. And he had a sense of humor! Along with all these qualities, he was also quite the humanist – a humanist of the classical type.

— Den høgre skolen (The Higher School)

He was a co-author and subsequently the sole author of the Haffner og Haagaas series of textbooks in mathematics, which was published between 1925 and 1979 in numerous editions. He was one of the handful of government-appointed examiners in mathematics at the examen artium university entrance exams for several decades. On his death he was described by Aftenposten as a "very widely known educator."

== Quotes ==
- "Latin, it is mathematics, language mathematics"
- "If we have two twins and one is named Clariss and the other is named Magdalena, and we say that Clariss equals Magdalena, then that is an equation."
- "We cannot afford to spend education on the lazy"

== Honours ==
- King's Medal of Merit in Gold, 1949, for services to education and for fostering culture and Bildung in wide circles of society
