= Foreign nobility in Norway =

Arms of the family de Créqui dit la Roche; they were noble in France and non-noble in Denmark and Norway. However, they had a prominent position in the country and its military.

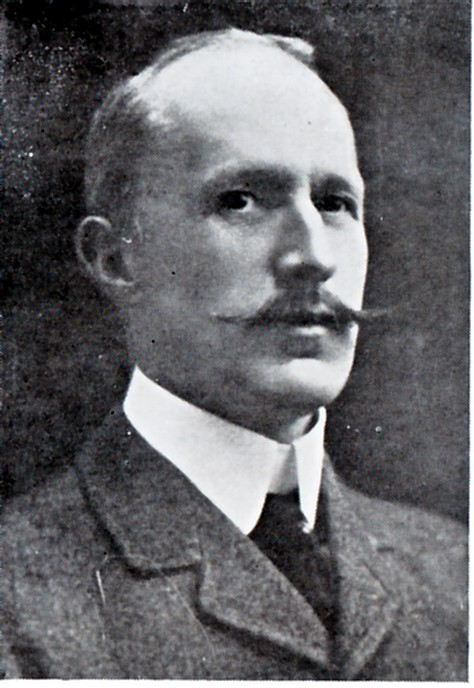
Thor von Ditten.

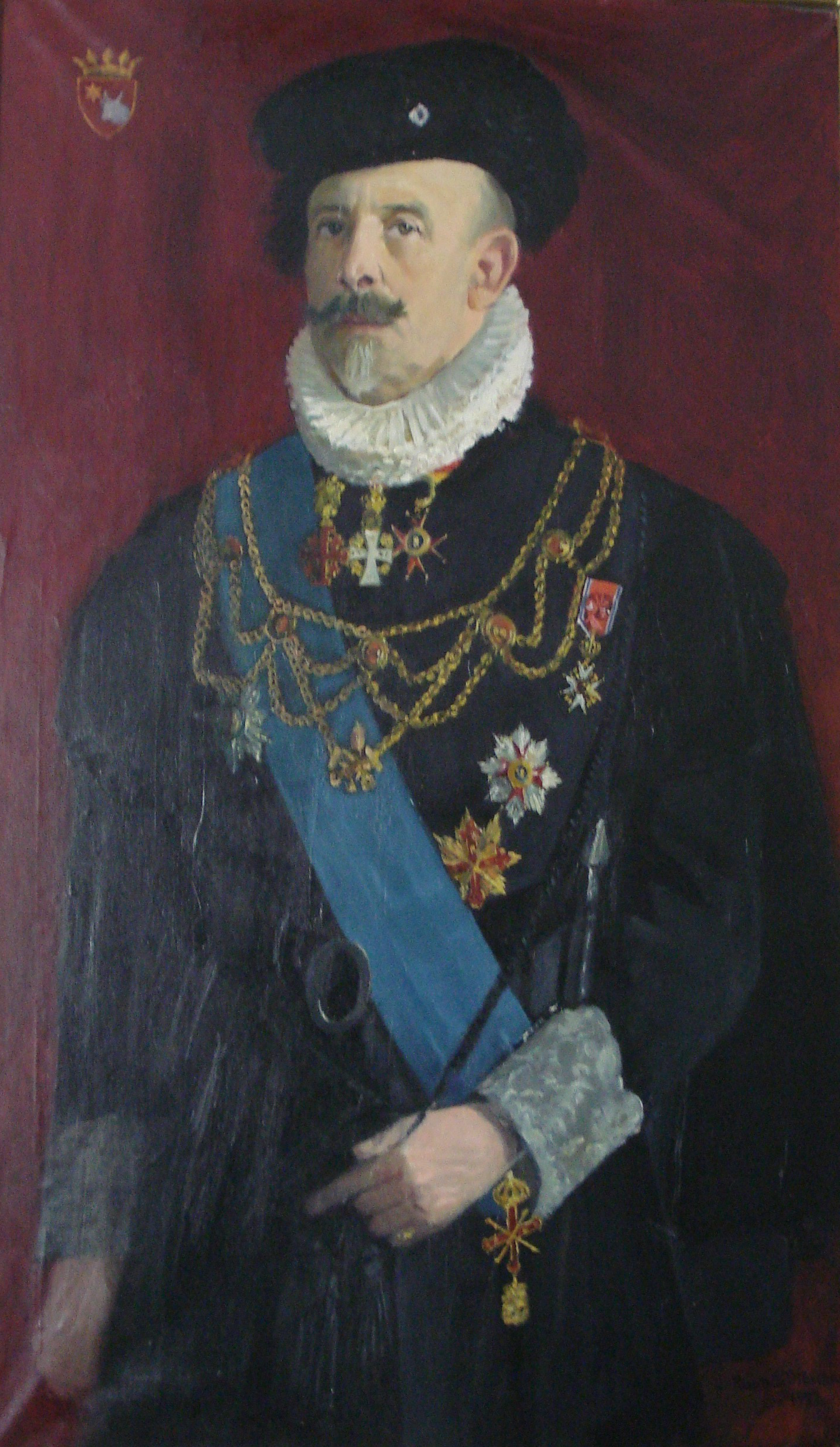
Christopher Tostrup Paus, a Norwegian of the Eastern Norwegian patriciate, was ennobled in 1923 by the Pope and conferred a hereditary comital title, recognised by the Holy See and Italy. The family has previously claimed, but never received official recognition of, status as ancient nobility.

Foreign nobility in Norway refers to foreign persons and families of nobility who in past and present have lived in Norway as well as to non-noble Norwegians who have enjoyed foreign noble status. Although being noble in their native countries, their foreign noble status did not automatically lead to naturalisation when entering the Kingdom. While some immigrant families were naturalised and became a part of the Norwegian nobility and later the Dano-Norwegian nobility, like Wedel-Jarlsberg, others did not apply for or receive a particular recognition, like de Créqui dit la Roche.

== General ==
According to genealogist and nobility expert Henrik Jørgen Huitfeldt-Kaas's list from 1886, Foreign Noble Families without Recognition as Dano-Norwegian Nobility, many of these foreign noble families had lived in Norway since the 16th and 17th century, and a few of their descendants still live in Norway today. Some of these families are also found in the surve Stifts-Relationer, made by Danish genealogist Terkel Klevenfeldt. The survey concerns Norwegian and Danish noble families, reported between 1747 and 1749, based on collected documents from the District Governors (Norwegian: stiftsamtmann) and bishops in various parts of Norway.

== List of families claiming foreign nobility without naturalization ==
C.o.a.	Name	Classification	Clame	Origin of nobility clame	Extinction	Ref.
	Barclay de Tolly	Noble	Came to Norway with major Stephan Barclay de Tolly (1677-1732).	Livonia		
	de Besche	Noble	Came to Norway with senior lieutenant Hans Henrich Christopher von Brømbsen (1772-).	Sweden		
	Bratt af Höglunda	Noble		Sweden		
	von Brømbsen	Noble	Came to Norway with senior lieutenant Hans Henrich Christopher von Brømbsen (1772-).	Livonia		
	Bärenfels von Warnau	Noble	Came to Norway in 1700s with lieutenant colonel Nicolai Christian Bärensfels de Warnau	Mecklenburg		
	af Geijerstam	Noble	1773 ennobled in Sweden. Came to Norway in 1905 with Gösta af Geijerstam (1888-1954).	Sweden		
	von Ditten	Noble	Came to Norway in 1789 with lieutenant colonel Friederich Christopher von Ditten (1761–1832).	Mecklenburg		
	von Haffner	Noble	Came to Norway in 1700s with Johan Frederich Wilhelm von Haffner to Dal.	Alsace		
	von Heinen	Noble	Came to Norway in 1600s with majorgeneral Albrecht Christopher von Heinen.	Livonia		
	von Huun	Noble	Came to Norway in 1732 with Mathias Christopherson von Hoyningen genannt Huene.	Westphalia		
	von Ingenhaeff	Noble	Came to Norway in 1770 with lieutenant general Christopher Fredrik von Ingenhaeff	Livonia		
	von Kaltenborn	Noble	Came to Norway in 1774 with majorgeneral Carl Friedrich von Kaltenborn.	Rhineland		
	von Koss	Noble	Came to Norway in 1600s with captain Johan Christoph von Koss.	Mecklenburg		
	von Koppelow	Noble	Came to Norway in 1662 with major Curt Christoph von Koppelow.	Mecklenburg		
	von Krogh	Noble	Came to Norway in 1600s with major Bernhardus von Krogh.	Bremen		
	von Kwetzinsky-Stetzenkow	Noble	Came to Norway with lieutenant-general Michael von Kwetzinsky.	Russia		
	von Lüttichau	Noble	Came to Norway with major general Wulff Caspar von Lüttichau or Lyttchau (1788-1831).	Saxony		
	von Meidell	Noble	Came to Norway with court junker Gert von Meidel (-1696).	Estonia		
	Mountevans	Baron	Came to Norway with Admiral Edward Ratcliffe Garth Russell Evans, 1st Baron Mountevans, how married in 1916 Elsa Andvord.	England		
	von Møsting	Noble	Known in Norway with major Nicolai Abraham von Møsting (1622-1683) to Høfdestad.	Brandenburg	1720 by extinction with major general Christian Georg von Møsting.	
	Paus	Count	With Christopher de Paus.	Holy See		
	von Printzen	Noble	Came to Norway with major Hjob Wilhelm von Printzen (-1740).	Brandenburg		
	von Racknitz	Baron	Came to Oslo with friherre Otto von Racknitz (1829-1913) how married Caspara Møller.	Steiermark		
	von Ramm	Noble	Came to Norway in 1670s with major Henrich Ramm (1654-1719).	Courland		
	von Reuss	Noble	Came to Norway in 1700s with Heinrich von Reuss.	Germany		
	Rokling (Roclenge)	Noble	Came to Norway around 1670 with senior lieutenant Johan Adam de Rochlenge. Line was not naturalist in Norway, another line was naturalist.	Courland		
	de Seue	Noble	Came to Norway with colonel Nicolai de Seue (-1706). Family obtained Danish nobility letter in 1841.	France		
	Scheel	Noble	Came to Norway major general Hans Jacob Scheel (1714-1774).	Germany		
	Stibolt	Noble	Came to Norway with captain Andreas Henrik Stibolt (1686-1726). Only the line living in Denmark was naturalised in 1777 with commander Caspar Henrik Stibolt (1692-1779).	Germany		
	de (von) Tabouillot	Noble	Noblesse de robe from France. Came to Norway in 1900s with dr.jur Wolfgang von Tabouillot gen. von Scheibler (1909–2002).	France		
	Uggla	Noble	Came to Norway in 1902 with Carl August Uggla (1846-).	Sweden		
	von Weltzin	Noble	Came to Norway with senior lieutenant Johan Ludvig von Weltzin (1709-1746).	Mecklenburg		

== Literature ==
- Huitfeldt-Kaas, Henrik Jørgen: «De nulevende adelsslægter i Norge», Historisk Tidsskrift. (1886, 2. rekke, 5. bind, pp. 145–160)
- von Rappe, Otto Friedrich: Innberetning fra stiftamtmann i Aggershus stift, om adelige familier. (1747)
- Biskop N. Dorphs fortegnelse på de adelige familier i Akershus stift. (1749)
- http://www.hoelseth.com/nobility/nobility_survey.html Dag Trygsland Hoelseth (1999-2010)
- https://web.archive.org/web/20110929003941/http://www.vigerust.net/adel/adel1814_slektsregister.html Tore H. Vigerust: "Alfabetisk register over adelige slekter i Norge omkring 1814"
- https://web.archive.org/web/20120426001735/http://www.wangensteen.net/ht/ht/stiftrelationer/ T. Klevenfeldt: E-book: "Stifts Relationer om Adelige i Danmark og Norge" (1747-1749)
- https://web.archive.org/web/20110929004058/http://www.vigerust.net/adel/adel1886_levende.html Tore H. Vigerust: Adel: H. J. Huitfeldt-Kaas' liste 1886 over påstått "levende adel i Norge"
- https://web.archive.org/web/20110929003647/http://www.vigerust.net/adel/adel1886_fremmed.html Tore H. Vigerust: Adel: H. J. Huitfeldt-Kaas' liste 1886 over "Fremmede Adelsslekter uten anerkjennelse som dansk-norsk adel"
- https://web.archive.org/web/20120111071023/http://www.vigerust.net/adel/adelhovedindex.html Tore H. Vigerust: Adel (Oslo, 2000-2004)
