= Hartvig Nissen School =

- Hartvig Nissens skole
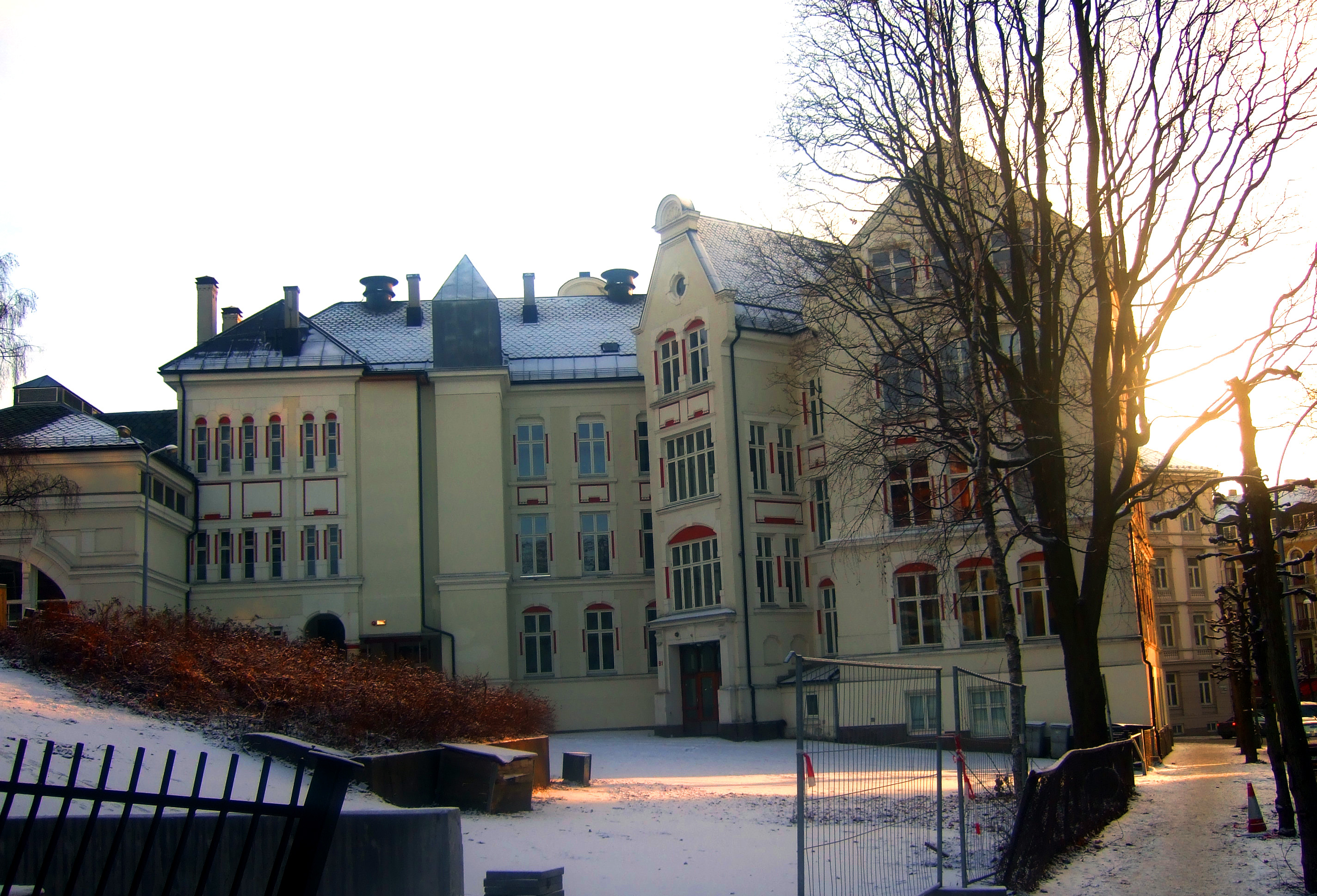
- Hartvig Nissens School

Location
- Niels Juels gate 56, Oslo; Oslo; Norway
- Coordinates: 59°55′07″N 10°43′00″E

Information
- School type: Public secondary school
- Founded: 1849; 177 years ago
- Principal: Hanna Norum Eliassen
- Staff: 105
- Grades: 11–13
- Age range: 16–19
- Classes offered: General education and drama education
- Language: Norwegian
- Campus: Urban
- Website: hartvig-nissen.vgs.no

The Hartvig Nissen School (Norwegian: Hartvig Nissens skole), informally referred to as Nissen, is a former girls' gymnasium in Oslo, Norway, now co-educational. It is located in the neighborhood Uranienborg in the affluent West End borough of Frogner. It is Norway's oldest high school for girls and is widely considered one of the country's two most prestigious high schools alongside the traditionally male-only Oslo Cathedral School; its alumni include many famous individuals and two members of the Norwegian royal family.

Originally named Nissen's Girls' School, it was founded by the educator Hartvig Nissen and was originally a private, progressive girls' school which was owned by its headmasters and which served the higher bourgeoisie. The school formerly also had its own teachers college. The school and its teachers college have the distinction of being both the first gymnasium and the first higher education institution in Norway which admitted girls and women, and the school and its owners played a key role in promoting female education during the 19th and early 20th century. The school was described in the British House of Commons in 1907 as "the pioneer of higher girls' schools in Norway." A few boys were admitted to the girls' school in 1955, and the school gradually became co-educational from then.

The school was located at the address Rosenkrantz' Gade 7 from 1849 to 1860 and at the address Øvere Voldgade 15 from 1860 to 1899. Then-owner-headmaster Bernhard Pauss moved the school to its current address, Niels Juels gate 56, and commissioned the construction of the current school building which was completed in 1899. In 1991 the school also acquired the building of its former neighbours Frogner School and Haagaas School at Niels Juels gate 52.

The TV series Skam was centered on the school. The then relatively new progressive girls' school is also referenced in the 1862 play Love's Comedy by Henrik Ibsen.

== History ==
It was established in 1849 by Hartvig Nissen and was originally a private girls' school, named Nissen's Girls' School (Nissens Pigeskole, later changed to the modern spelling Nissens Pikeskole). The school was privately owned, usually by its headmasters, until it was sold to Christiania Municipality in 1918. Nissen's Girls' School was the first institution in Norway to offer examen artium—the university entrance exam—for women. Then-owner Bernhard Cathrinus Pauss also established the first tertiary education for women in Norway, a women's teacher's college named Nissen's Teachers' College (Nissens Lærerinneskole).

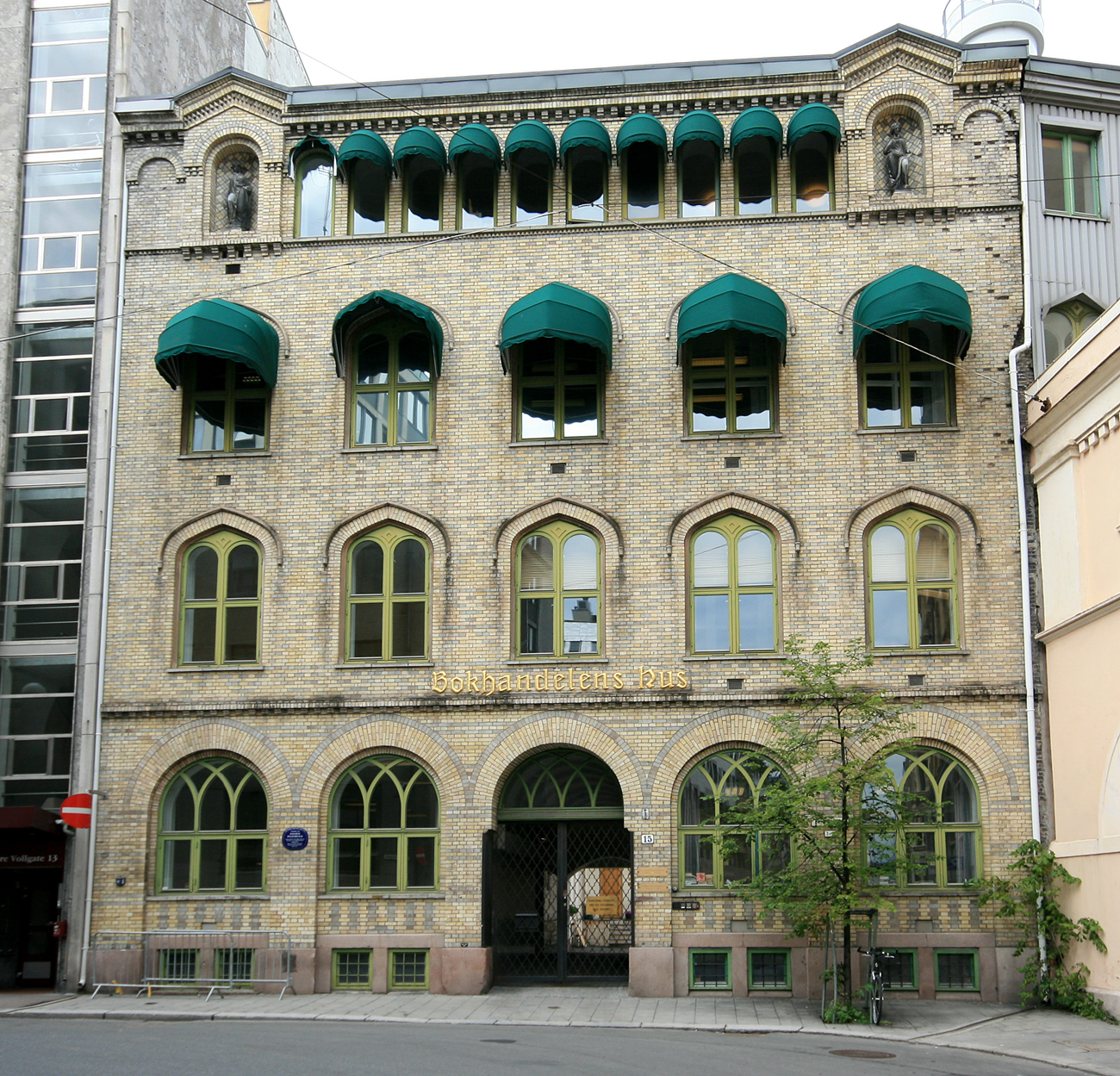
The former school building in Øvre Vollgate 15, now the seat of Bokhandelens Hus

Nissen's Girls' School mainly served the higher bourgeoisie, and was one of three leading private higher schools in Oslo, alongside Frogner School and Vestheim School. Due to its location in the wealthy borough of Frogner and also because few working-class Norwegians attended gymnasium before the "education revolution" that started in the 1960s, it remained a school of choice for pupils from affluent families also after it was acquired by the municipality, although today, it has pupils from all parts of Oslo and with more diverse backgrounds. Its alumni include two members of the Norwegian royal family, Princess Ragnhild and Princess Astrid.

From 1860 to 1899, the school was located in a building in Øvre Vollgate 15 in central Oslo. The current school building in Niels Juels gate 56 was commissioned by then-owner Bernhard Cathrinus Pauss in 1897, designed by Hartvig Nissen's son, architect Henrik Nissen, and built by Harald Kaas. The girls' school gradually became a co-educational school from the mid-1950s, after four boys were admitted in 1955 alongside hundreds of girls. Nissen's Girls' School changed its name to Nissen School in 1957 and to Hartvig Nissen School in 1963. In 1991, it also acquired the buildings of its neighbour, the former Frogner School and the former Frogner Trade School. The school is famous for its focus on theatre, having many actors among its alumni. It was also the first school in Norway to introduce a pupil's council, in 1919.

== Cultural depictions ==
The school is referenced in the play Love's Comedy by Henrik Ibsen; Ibsen scholar Ivo de Figueiredo notes that "Love's Comedy is rich in so many ways. (...) Its most striking references, however, were to contemporary Christiania, and alert readers could spot references to places such as Kurland, a Kristiania 'Lover's Lane', and institutions such as Hartvig Nissen's girls' school."

The TV series Skam revolved around the school. The show is about teen Norwegian girls and boys who live in Oslo and who attend Hartvig Nissen School.

== Owners ==
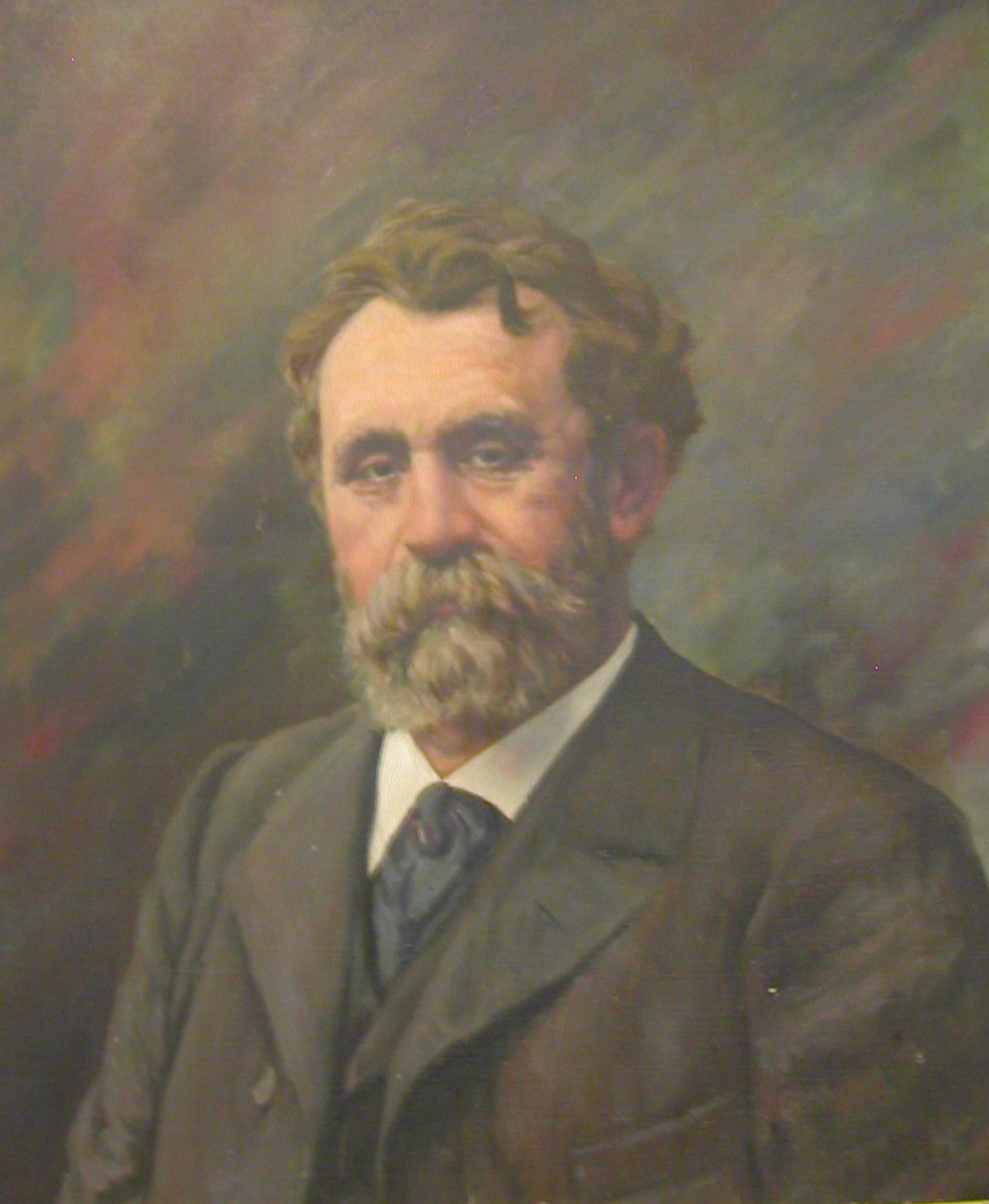
Bernhard Cathrinus Pauss, the school's last headmaster-owner

- Hartvig Nissen (1849–1872, sole owner until 1865, then one third)
- Johan Carl Keyser (1865–1899, one third)
- Einar Lyche (1865–1899, one third)
- Andreas Martin Corneliussen (1899–1900, one half)
- Bernhard Cathrinus Pauss (1872–1903, one third until 1899, one half until 1900 and sole owner 1900–1903)
- Frogner skoles interessentskap (Thorvald Prebensen, Theodor Haagaas and others) (1903–1918, sole owner)
- Christiania/Oslo municipality (sole owner from 1918)

== Notable faculty ==
Notable people who have taught at Nissen's Girls' School/Hartvig Nissen School include:

- Peter Ludwig Mejdell Sylow, mathematician who proved foundational results in group theory.
- Ole Jacob Broch, mathematician, physicist, economist and government minister.

== Notable alumni ==
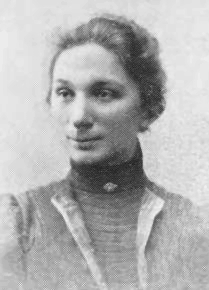
Clara Holst was a philologist and women's rights pioneer. She was the first woman to earn a doctorate degree in Norway.

Notable people who have graduated from Nissen's Girls' School/Hartvig Nissen School include:

- Princess Ragnhild
- Princess Astrid
- Alette Engelhart, women's activist
- Clara Holst, first woman to obtain a doctorate in Norway
- Eva Nansen, mezzo-soprano and wife of Fridtjof Nansen
- Harriet Backer, painter
- Hege Schøyen, comedian
- Jon Balke, jazz musician
- Lea Myren, actress and fashion model
- Lillebjørn Nilsen, songwriter
- Margrethe Munthe, children's writer, songwriter and playwright
- Margrethe Parm, Christian leader and scout leader
- Maria Bonnevie, actress
- Ragna Nielsen, pedagogue
- Ragnhild Jølsen, writer
- Tarjei Sandvik Moe, actor
- Toril Brekke, novelist
- Triana Iglesias, model
- Ulrik Imtiaz Rolfsen, film director
