= Tabouillot =

French noble family

- Noble house
- Coat of arms of the Tabouillot family
- Country: France, Germany, Norway, Spain

The Tabouillot family is a French noble family, originally from Regret, a village near Verdun. Family members were prominent in the legal profession, the church, as local government officials and as estate owners in Marville, Damvillers, Verdun and Metz, and the family was ennobled in the 18th century, becoming part of the French Nobles of the Robe.

After fleeing the French Revolution and the Reign of Terror, Louis de Tabouillot, an officer of the French King's personal bodyguard and later of the royalist counter-revolutionary Armée des Princes, was appointed an officer in the Prussian Army by special royal decree in 1795 and recognised as noble in the Kingdom of Prussia. His descendants received royal permission in 1858 to combine the names and arms of the Tabouillot and Scheibler families as von Tabouillot genannt von Scheibler. Today, family members live in France, Scandinavia, Spain and Germany.

== History ==
=== In France ===
The family is descended from Jean de Tabouillot (ca. 1602–1672). His son, the prosecutor Claude de Tabouillot (born 1630), was the father of marchand tanneur Pierre de Tabouillot (died 1735), who was married to Nicole Gauffet. Their son, conseiller du Roi Claude de Tabouillot (1701–1786), was married to Elisabeth de Bignicourt (died 1787). They were the parents of conseiller du roi, prosecutor and police president of Verdun Louis François de Tabouillot (1733–1806), who was married to Anne de Grandfèbre (1747–1794).

Louis François de Tabouillot and Anne de Grandfèbre were the parents of Antoine Charles Louis de Tabouillot (1775–1813) and of Claire-Louise de Tabouillot (born 1775), who was married to the commissaire des guerres, René François Marchal de Corny, who belonged to a prominent noble family from Lorraine.

Frank Whitney notes:

A large wealthy family with branches in Marville, Damvillers, Verdun and Metz, the Tabouillots by the mid eighteenth century had become well established in the legal profession, the church and as local government officials. Hubert Tabouillot, a marchand tanneur, later served as a notary and eventually became mayor of Marville. His younger brother Claude, a resident of Damvillers, succeeded Hubert in both positions and later was ennobled for his service to the crown.

=== During and after the French revolution ===
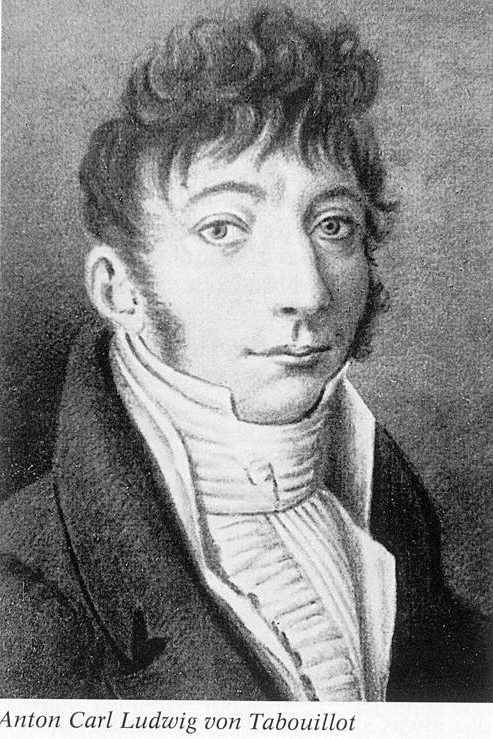
Antoine Charles Louis de Tabouillot (1775–1813), a French officer, later a Prussian officer and Mayor of Essen under Napoleonic rule

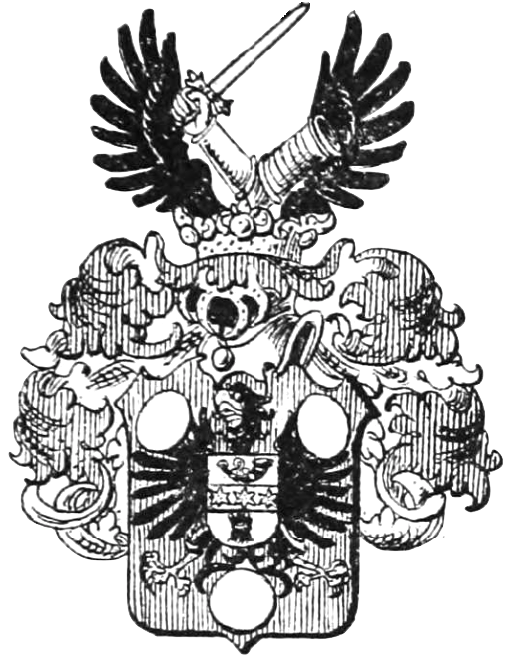
Coat of arms of the von Tabouillot gen. von Scheibler family branch, with the ancestral Tabouillot arms as the central escutcheon

Tabouillot-Scheibler coat of arms

Antoine Charles Louis de Tabouillot (1775–1813) was an officer of the French King's personal bodyguard Garde du Corps at Versailles and of the Armée des Princes, a royalist counter-revolutionary army during the French Revolution. During the Reign of Terror, he fled to the Kingdom of Prussia in 1793; his mother Anne de Grandfèbre was executed by guillotine in Paris in 1794 and the family's property in France was confiscated. In Prussia Louis de Tabouillot was accepted as a lieutenant of the Prussian Army on 29 January 1795 by a special decree of King Frederick William II of Prussia. The King promised him a promotion to captain when he had improved his knowledge of the German language. Accordingly, he was later promoted to captain in the Count Wedel Fusilier Battalion. He was appointed as Mayor (French: maire) of Essen by the French during the Napoleonic Wars in 1811.

In 1802, Louis de Tabouillot married Philippina Johanna Brüning (1777–1835), daughter of the Georg Heinrich Brüning (1727-1806), Mayor of Essen. They were the parents of Franz Georg Karl Wilhelm von Tabouillot (1803–1872), a judge in Münster, and of Alfred Philipp Ferdinand von Tabouillot, a wine merchant who was married to the noted feminist and socialist Mathilde von Tabouillot (later known as Mathilde Anneke).

Franz Georg Karl Wilhelm von Tabouillot was married to Karoline Luise Alexandrine von Scheibler (1819-1874), a member of a prominent German family and a descendant of the philosopher Christoph Scheibler. They were the parents of Lieutenant Ferdinand Franz Ludwig Heinrich Johann von Tabouillot (1840–1869), who was married to Anne Karolina Amalia von Pannwitz (b. 1847). On 29 June 1858, the family obtained royal permission in the Kingdom of Prussia to combine the names and arms of Tabouillot and von Scheibler, and henceforth used the name von Tabouillot genannt von Scheibler.

Ferdinand von Tabouillot was the father of Major Franz Ferdinand Alexander Hans von Tabouillot gen. von Scheibler (1869–1944), who, in 1908, was married to Margarethe Eleonore Marie Helene von Grolman (1880–1964), a daughter of Major-General and Chamberlain at the Grand Ducal Hessian Court Karl von Grolman (1843–1909). The current family is descended from their son, Dr.jur. Wolfgang von Tabouillot gen. von Scheibler (1909–2002), who was married in his first marriage in 1938 in Oslo Militære Samfund to Norwegian citizen Ingrid Haagaas.

Members of the family live in France, Germany, Spain and Scandinavia. Family members now mostly use the name (von/de) Tabouillot, having dropped the Scheibler name. However the senior agnatic extant branch of the noble family uses the Norwegian surname Haagaas.

== Overview ==
- Jean Tabouillot (ca. 1602–1672)
  - Claude Tabouillot (1630–1729), Procureur ∞ Marie Poncelet (1644–1721)
    - Hubert Tabouillot (1684– 1768), marchand tanneur, procureur syndic de Marville
    - Pierre Tabouillot († 1735), marchand tanneur ∞ Nicole Gauffet
      - Claude de Tabouillot (1701–1786), Conseiller du Roi ∞ Elisabeth de Bignicourt (died 1787)
        - François de Tabouillot (1733–1806), Conseiller du Roi ∞ 1767 Anne de Grand-Fèvre (1747–1794)
          - Captain Antoine Charles Louis de Tabouillot (1775–1813), Mayor of Essen, ∞ 1802 Philippina Johanna von Brüning (1777–1835)
            - Franz Georg Karl Wilhelm von Tabouillot (1803–1872), judge in Münster ∞ 1839 Karoline Luise Alexandrine von Scheibler (1819–1874)
              - Lieutenant Ferdinand Franz Ludwig Johannes Heinrich von Tabouillot genannt von Scheibler, ∞ 1868 Anne Karolina Amalia von Pannwitz (born 1847)
                - Major Franz Ferdinand Alexander Hans von Tabouillot genannt von Scheibler (born 1869) ∞ Margaretha von Grolman
                  - Dr Wolfgang von Tabouillot genannt von Scheibler (1909–2002), married in his first marriage Norwegian citizen Ingrid Haagaas (1913–1992) on 4 February 1938 in Oslo Militære Samfund; married in his second marriage Spanish citizen María Antonia Pacios
                  - Irmgard von Tabouillot genannt von Scheibler (1911–1999) ∞ 1936 Heinz-Adolf Eusebius Odilo Ingraban von Brand (1910–1977)
            - Alfred Renaud Ferdinand Philipp von Tabouillot ∞ married firstly Mathilde Franziska Giesler (1817-1837) ∞ married secondly in 1843 to Agnes Froschmeier
              - Anna Elisabeth Franziska Sophia Friederike von Tabouillot (d. 1837)

== Coat of arms ==
Argent, a fess azure charged with three stars, argent, in chief a hunting horn, en pointe a wheat garb, sable.

== Literature ==
- Genealogisches Handbuch des Adels. Adelslexikon. Vol. XIV. Vol. 131 of the entire series. C. A. Starke Verlag. Limburg (Lahn) 2003. ISSN 0435-2408
