= Adelgunde Vogt =

Danish sculptor (1811–1892)

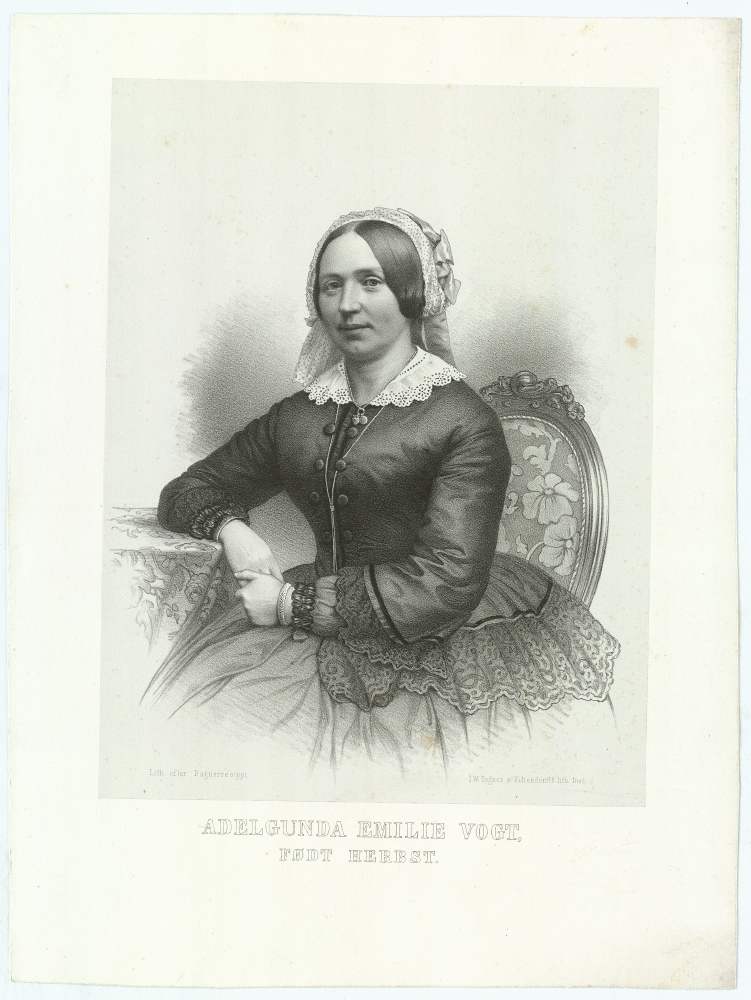
- Depiction of Vogt from 1859
- Born: Emilie Adelgunde Herbst; July 17, 1811; Copenhagen, Denmark
- Died: June 10, 1892 (aged 80); Copenhagen, Denmark

Adelgunde Vogt or Adelgunda Vogt (17 July 1811 – 10 June 1892) was a Danish sculptor best known for her realistic sculptures of animals in ivory and bronze. She is considered to be the first woman to work as a professional sculptor in Denmark and is credited with having pioneered the genre of animal sculpture in the country.

Vogt's work focused on life-like representations of horses, dogs, deer, and cows. She produced life-sized sculptures, in addition to smaller works cast in bronze and zinc, or carved in ivory and boxwood. Although best known for her animal sculptures, she also made portrait busts of prominent people, including Jonas Collin, Ole Bang, and Jens Peter Møller.

Although she was prevented from jointing the Royal Danish Academy of Fine Arts, she gained informal access to the art market through Bertel Thorvaldsen, who also gave her space in his studio. Vogt's works were regularly exhibited at the Charlottenborg Spring Exhibition. Her pieces were purchased by a variety of influential people of the time, including Christian VIII who was one of her patrons. Much of her work no longer survives, following the 1884 fire of Christiansborg and poor archival storage techniques.

== Biography ==
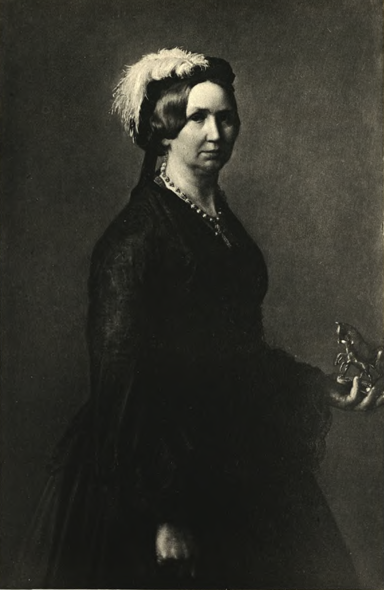
Painting of Adelgunde Vogt by Carl Bloch, 1867

Emilie Adelgunde Vogt was the daughter of Michael Johan Christian Herbst (1775–1830) and Michelle Elisabeth Christiance Charlotte Stibolt (1788–1861). Her father was a Commissioner General and the director of the military garment factory in Usserød. She spent her youth in Sorø and Slagelse. After the death of her father, the family moved to Copenhagen in 1837. Her paternalgrandfather was the naval officer Adolph Tobias Herbst. Her maternal grandfather was the naval officer Andreas Henrik Stibolt. One of her brothers was the archeologist Christian Herbst. One of their sisters were married to the politician Iver Johan Unsgaard. Another sister was married to the landowner Jens Christian Selchau.

When she was 12 years old, she suffered a physically traumatic fall. As a result, she bedridden until the age of 14 and occupied her time by drawing and carving animals. Her parents arranged for her to receive lessons from sculptor Johan Peter Heldt, who was then a student at the Royal Danish Academy of Fine Arts. In 1837, she began studying with Hermann Ernst Freund. She began to work at Bertel Thorvaldsen's Charlottenborg studio in 1840.

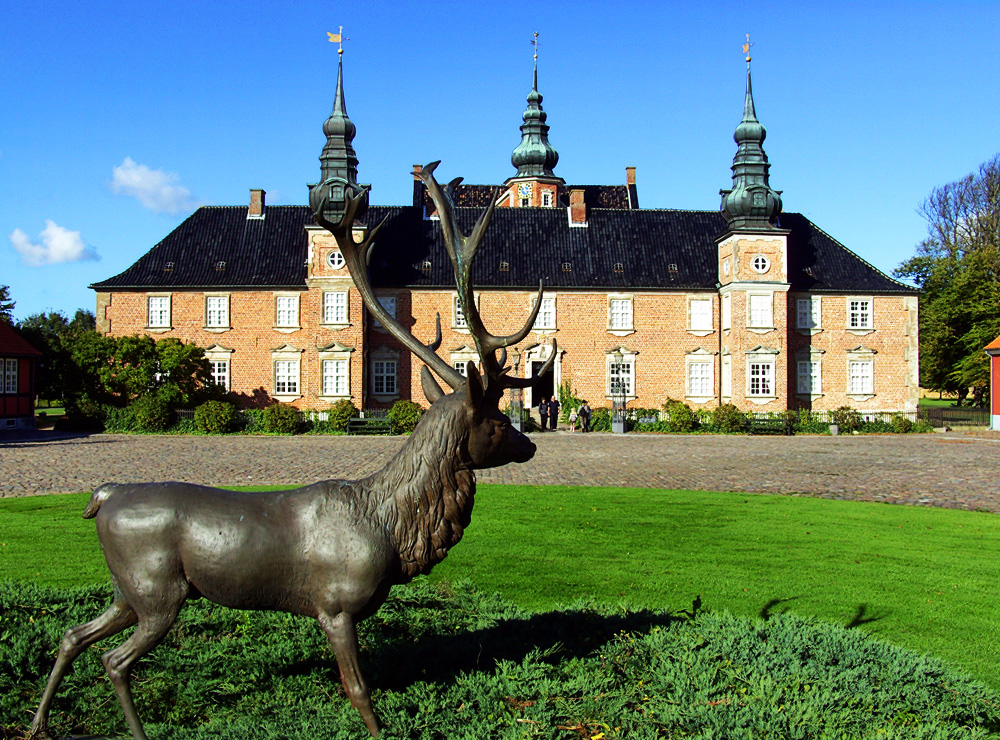
Deer sculpture in front of Jægerspris Castle (1850).

She made her debut as an artist in 1838, when she exhibited three works, including a small ivory sculpture of a horse at the Charlottenborg Spring Exhibition. In 1839, she was awarded the Neuhausen Prize for her sculpture En Ko med en diende Kalv by the Royal Danish Academy of Fine Arts. In 1843 she was nominated by Thorvaldsen, who was then the academy's director, to become an inducted member. However, women were not permitted to be inducted into the academy, and so instead she was made an honorary member. After Thorvaldsen died in 1844, she was granted a travel allowance from the crown which she used to study in Italy, staying there for five years.

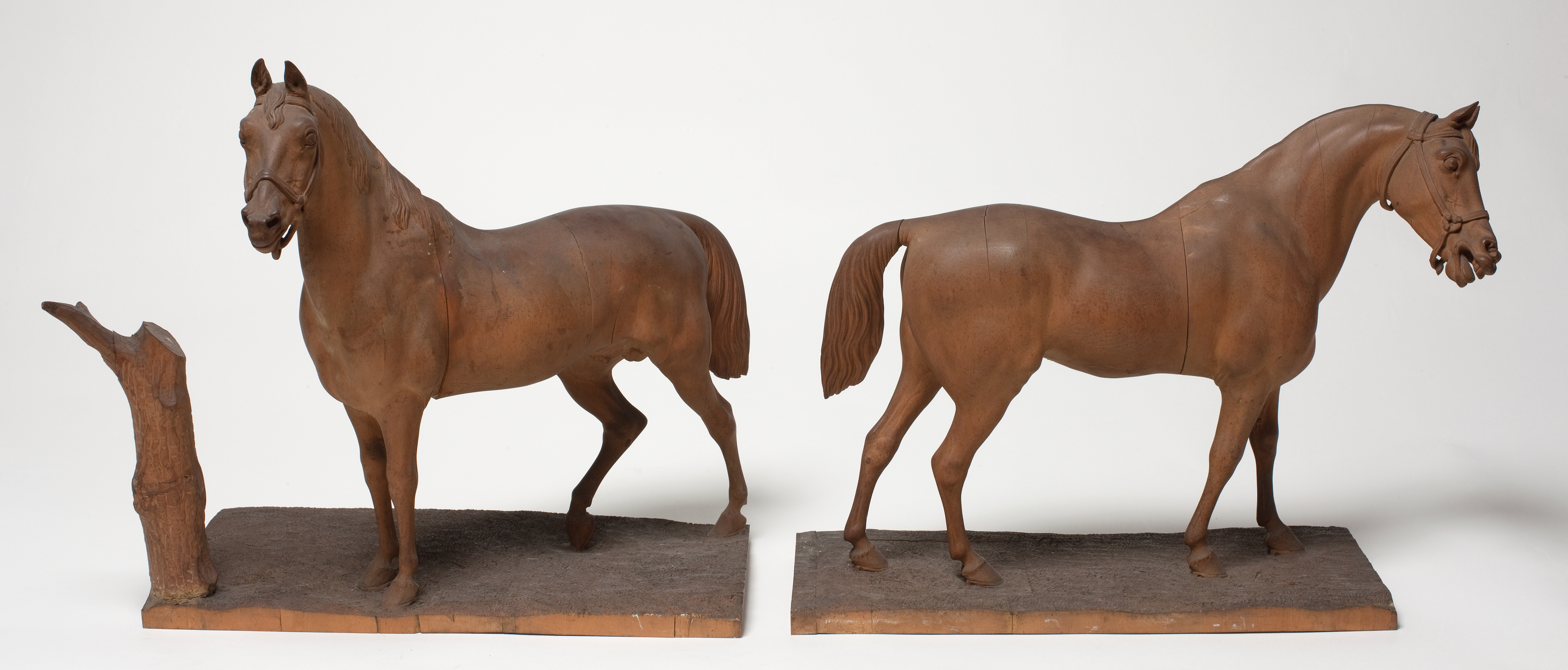
To stående heste, boxwood, 1863

On 1 March 1846 she married chargé d’affaires Frederik Siegfried Vogt (1777–1855) in Naples. After the couple returned to Denmark from Italy, she stepped back from her career and focused on her role as a wife and mother to their two sons: Henrik Christian (1848–1928) and Gundo Seiersfred (1852–1939). Henrik Christian became an engineer and Gundo, like his mother, became a sculptor. It was only after Vogt's husband died in 1855 that she began working as a sculptor again, exhibiting regularly at the Charlottenborg Spring Exhibition to great acclaim between 1860 and 1672. During this later part of her career, she primarily produced smaller sculptures, as she no longer had the resources and space that Thorvaldsen's studio afforded.

She died in Copenhagen on 10 June 1892 and was buried in Assistens Cemetery next to her husband and sister. Her work was posthumously displayed at the 1895 Copenhagen Women's Exhibition and is credited with having inspired the generation of female sculptors who emerged in the late 19th century.

== Selected works ==
- En ko med diende kalv (1839), Funen's Art Museum
- En kronhjort med hind og kalv (1842), Vemmetofte
- Bust of I.J. Unsgaard (1842)
- En bjørn (1862), Gammel Estrup Manor
- To stående heste (1863), National Gallery of Denmark
