= Hans Peter Edvind Johannesen =

Norwegian barrister and civil servant

Hans Peter Edvind Johannesen (3 September 1846, Frederikshald – 29 November 1909) was a Norwegian barrister and civil servant.

He obtained the cand.jur. degree at the Royal Frederick University in 1872 and worked as a barrister in Frederikshald from 1875. He was appointed as a brigade attorney (brigadeauditør) in 1888 and was appointed as war attorney (krigsadvokat) in Frederikshald in 1901. He served as an elector and as a member of the city council for several years, and was at times acting mayor, magistrate, chief of police and district judge. He was an active amateur painter and singer, and wrote several plays for Fredrikshald Theatre.

He was the son of the Swedish-born Frederikshald merchant Johannes Johannesen, and was married to Elise Marie Hount Petersen (f. 1857), a daughter of foundry master Johannes Petterson (who owned Veden Manor for some years) and Grethe Caroline Harrifsleff. Elise Marie Petersen was a great-granddaughter of Peter Ulrik Magnus Hount, a member of the Norwegian Constituent Assembly. They were the parents of Elin Johannesen (born 1879), who married captain and barrister in Frederikshald Arne Grøntvedt (1873–1909), and Karin Hount Johannesen (1887–1971), who married Swedish estate owner and count Georg Trolle-Wachtmeister (1884–1971).

Villa Solbraa in Halden was built for him in 1895, designed by Wilhelm Christian Suhrke.
