= Håkås =

Hill in Trøgstad, Østfold, Norway

- IUCN category Ia (strict nature reserve)
- Location within Norway
- Location: Båstad, Trøgstad, Norway
- Coordinates: 59°40′48″N 11°15′56″E

Håkås (pronounced [ˈhôːkoːs]; from Old Norse Haukáss, "hawk hill"), formerly spelled Haagaas and Haakaas, is a hill and an area near the lake Øyeren in Båstad in Trøgstad, Østfold, Norway, 25 kilometres southeast of Oslo. It is also the name of three neighbouring farms in the immediate vicinity of the hill. In 2016 the Håkås nature reserve was established by the King-in-Council; consisting of the Håkås forests near Øyeren, it was fully protected due to its importance to biodiversity.

== History ==
Håkås consists of three farms known as Håkås Nordre (Northern Håkås), Håkås Søndre (Southern Håkås) and Håkås Mellom (Middle Håkås), which were historically two and originally most likely one farm. Håkås borders Agnes to the north and Engen to the south. The Håkås hill is a forested hill around 185 metres above sea level, and ca. 15–30 metres above its surroundings on all sides. The main buildings of Håkås Nordre are found directly to the north of the hill.

Håkås is located in one of the oldest and most fertile agricultural areas in Norway. The Håkås farms are known since the Middle Ages, and are "considered to be among Båstad's best farms". At the time the record book of bishop Eystein (the "Red Book") was written in 1396, there were two Haukas farms here. As of 1723, there were three Hochaas farms. The largest farm is Håkås Nordre. The same family owned one or more of the Håkås farms at least from the 16th century to the late 19th century. The first known owner, Aslach of Håkås Nordre, is mentioned in 1555 and 1574. His son Einer Aslachsen (1565–1637) of Håkås Nordre and grandson Aslach Einersen (1600–1686) owned a large estate consisting of nearly a dozen wholly or partially owned farms in the district.

The name Haukáss is documented since 1379, when one of the farms is mentioned in a letter of 17 June 1379 published in the Diplomatarium Norvegicum, although the name is likely a good deal older than the 14th century, possibly dating back to the 1st millennium. Spelling variants include Haukáss, Haukas (1379, 1396), Haggaaiß (ca. 1475), Houkaas (1574), Hogaas (1593), Hockaas (1604), Hogos (1609), Hachos (1610), Haagaas (1612), Hochaas (1723), Haakaas, Hokaas and the current Håkås. The spelling Haagaas (pronounced [hɔɡɔs]) was commonly used until the early 20th century. The sound [æʉ] (represented by au in writing) in the first syllable was changed to [ɔ] (represented by å in modern Norwegian) under the influence of the vowel in the second syllable, during or around the 16th century. The modern Norwegian spelling of Haukáss would be Haukås.

The school logo used by the students at Haagaas School during their russ celebration was a humorous interpretation of the Haagaas name as "H goose;" in reality the name means "hawk hill"

Thor Christensen (1793–1863) and Anne Taraldsdatter (1797–1867), who owned Håkås Nordre (then spelled Haagaas Nordre), were the parents of Theodor Christian Haagaas (1823–1899), who was managing director of the sawmills of Saugbrugsforeningen, Norway's largest timber company. He married Nora Martha Petersen, daughter of Swedish-born Johannes Petersen (Petterson), who owned Veden Manor, and was the father of the educator Theodor Haagaas (1873–1961), who founded the Haagaas School in Oslo, which was thus ultimately named for Håkås. Theodor Christian Haagaas was also the maternal grandfather of the publisher Henrik Groth. Anne Taraldsdatter was a descendant of the family which had owned the farm at least since the 16th century, and of the abovementioned Aslach Einersen; her father owned the large neighbouring farm Bjørnstad while her mother was from Håkås Nordre.

The road Haakaasveien is named for the farms and the hill.

== Bech's Chapel ==
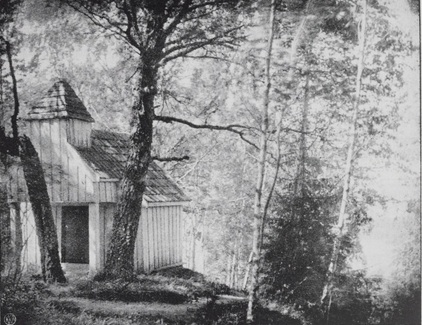
Bech's Chapel (1914)

Near Håkås Søndre (59.673138°N 11.255372°E), there is a strange chapel called Bech's Chapel, built by the student and owner of Håkås Søndre Peter Christian Bech around 1816 as a memorial for himself. A lifelong student of theology, he died at Håkås Søndre in 1818, and carefully staged his own death. He is buried under the chapel, and his horse and dog are buried in front of it (the horse to the left and the dog to the right). An obituary by himself in Danish and Latin was placed inside the chapel. It reads:

This cave down here hides in her womb
The remains of the deceased Peter Christian Bech
Born of parents Christian Bech, vicar of Trøgstad
and mother Johanne Ejlertz
Both Danish by birth
At Trøgstad vicarage on 29 May 1756
And died here on Haagensaas on 17 August 1818
He lived and died as a student
Never did he want anything higher
Never married
Satisfied with his fate;
Therefore he lived a happy life
Authored by himself
