= Haagaas School =

- Haagaas Artiumskursus
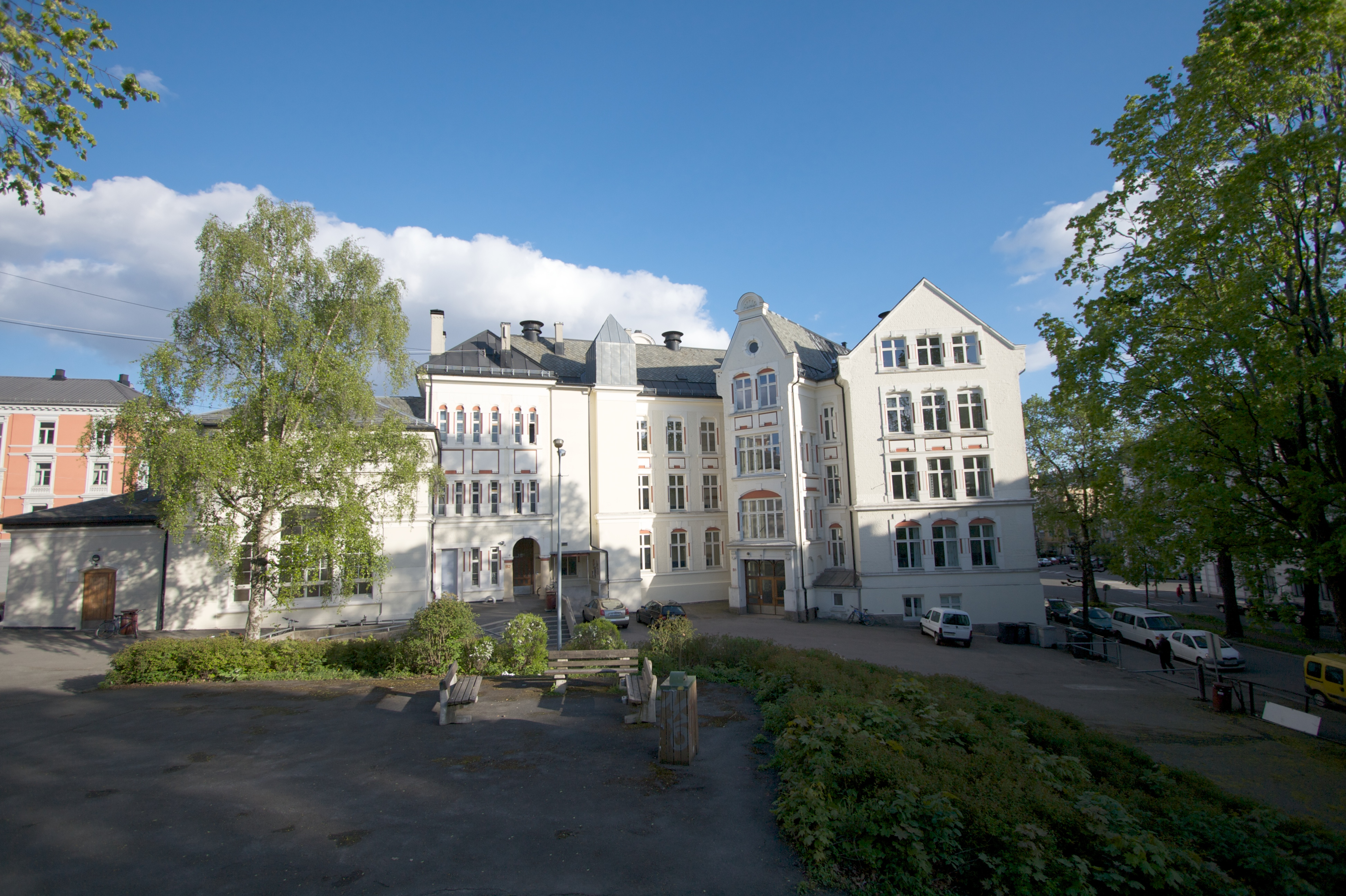
- Haagaas Artiumskursus was located in Niels Juels gate 52 together with Frogner School

Location
- Niels Juels gate 22; Oslo; Norway
- Coordinates: 59°55′07″N 10°43′01″E

Information
- School type: Private gymnasium
- Founded: 1915
- Founder: Theodor Haagaas
- Closed: 1955
- Headmaster: Theodor Haagaas
- Employees: 20 (1946)
- Age range: 16–19
- Enrollment: 127 (1946)
- Language: Norwegian
- Campus: Urban

The Haagaas School (Norwegian: Haagaas Artiumskursus, informally also Haagaas skole, Haagaas private gymnas or Haagaas' studentfabrikk), or simply Haagaas, was a private gymnasium in Oslo, that existed from 1915 to 1955. It was located in Niels Juels gate 52 at Frogner, in the same building as Frogner School. The school's founder, owner and headmaster until his retirement in 1946 was Theodor Haagaas. The school was a so-called "student factory" (studentfabrikk), offering a fast track to the examen artium (university entrance exam), in the tradition of the Heltberg School of the 19th century, and was considered the "new Heltberg." As of 1946, the school had 20 teachers, five classes and 127 students, and was entirely funded by tuition.

== Alumni ==
- Finn Alnæs
- Reidar Ditlev Danielsen
- Henry Gleditsch
- Mosse Jørgensen
- Leif B. Lillegaard
- Knut Selmer
- Bernhard Stokke
- Leif Tronstad
