= Christian Herbst =

Danish archaeologist and numismatist

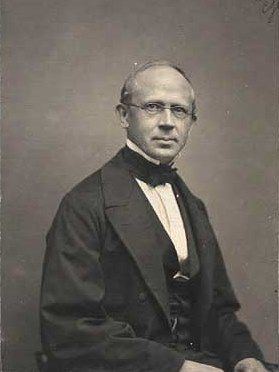
Christian Herbst.

Christian Frederik Herbst (7 April 1818 - 1 July 1911) was a Danish archaeologist and numismatist. He served as director of the Rosenborg Collections and the Royal Coin and Medal Collection in Copenhagen and as chairman of the Museum of National History at Frederiksborg Castle in Hillerød

== Early life and education ==
Herbst was born on 7 April 1818 in Copenhagen, the son of Michael Johan Christian Herbst (1775–1830) and Michelle Elisabeth Christiane Charlotte Stibolt (1788–1861). His father was director of the military garment factory. His paternalgrandfather was the naval officer Adolph Tobias Herbst. His maternal grandfather was the naval officer Andreas Henrik Stibolt. One of his sisters was the sculptor Adelgunde Vogt. Another sister was married to the politician Iver Johan Unsgaard. A third sister was married to the landowner Jens Christian Selchau.

Herbst graduated from Slagelse Latin School in 1837. He subsequently began to study law at the University of Copenhagen.

== Career ==
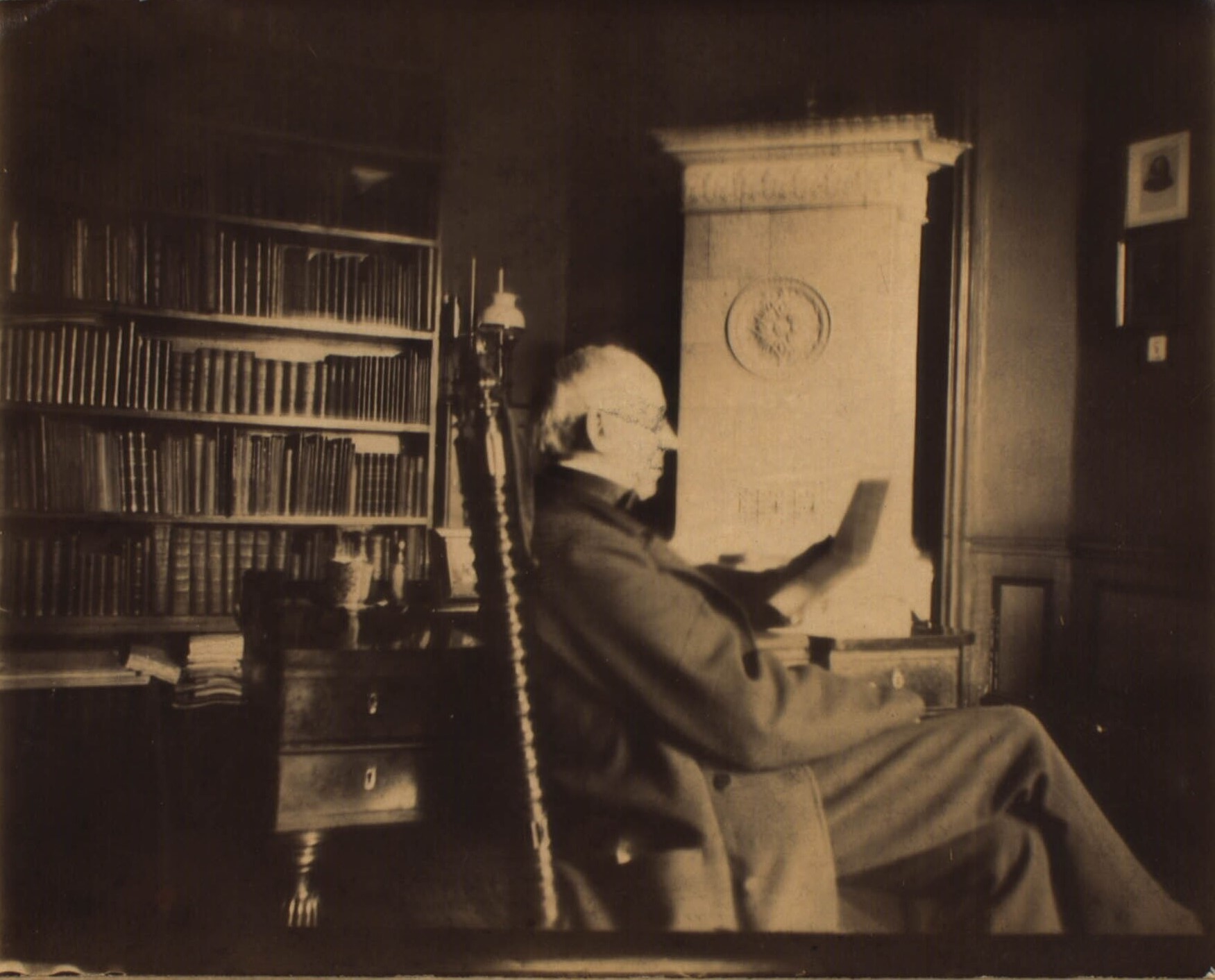
Christian Herbst.

Herbst took an interest in archeology and numismatics from an early age. He therefore combined his law studies with an unpaid job as an assistant at the Royal Coin and Medal Collection. His studies of archeology and numismatics attracted the attention of Christian Jürgensen Thomsen.

In 1848, he was employed as archivist at the Antiquarian-Topographical Archives and secretary for the Commission for the Storage of Antiquities. He worked for the new Museum of Nordic Antiquities from 1849 and became its inspector in 1866 alongside Thomsen who became its director. In 1887, he became chairman of the Museum of National History at Frederiksborg Castle. In 1892, he became director of the Rosenborg Collections and the Royal Coin and Medal Collection.

== Personal life ==
On 20 March 1860, Herbst was married to Ophelia Sophie Christiane Annette Christine Gerstenberg Rosted (1838- 1921). She was the daughter of Jakob G. Rosted (1806–77-) and Adolphine Andrea Herbst (1806–51). Her father owned Hejnstrupgård at Gundsømagle.

Herbst died on 1 July 1911 in Copenhagen. He is buried at Holmens Cemetery.

== Awards ==
Herbst was awarded the title of Kammerråd in 1856. Justitsråd in 1869 and Konferensråd in 1898. He was created a Knight of the Order of the Dannebrog in 1875. He was awarded the Cross of Honour in 1886 and became a commander in the order of the Dannebrog in 1893.
