= The New School Foundation =

The New School Movement Foundation in Oslo opened the first New School in Autumn 2004. The Foundation is the umbrella organisation for the New School Movement. The founder of the School is Mosse Jørgensen. The New School is a semi-private/semi-public (i.e. free), not for profit organisation owned by the parents of the children (primary and secondary school children). The movement behind the school traces its origins to the core of the historical establishment of research-based Pedagogics at the University of Jena in 1927 by Professor Peter Petersen. Pedagogy was then a novel science as a humanistic science within the University, Academic sector. The New school was precedented by a high school, The Research High School in Oslo, founded by Mosse Jørgensen in 1969, based on the same research and tenets as the New School of 2004 in Oslo, Norway. The movement behind is understood as the movement creating the Unity school reform in 1936 in Norway, and is associated with the international school reform-movement for a child friendly, child oriented school. This reform made the Norwegian school system to be the first in the World to found a national public educational system on the findings of the scientific research on the novel science of Pedagogy. That is a school that takes as its primary reasons the individual potential for practical and theoretical learning, communal responsibility and democratic skills. The New School is defined by the following parameters. (It is thought that scientific research on learning has shown that these principles makes the best conditions for education and learning):

== Self-initiated learning ==
Education (i.e. educational programmes) is not synonymous with learning. The best effect of learning comes when the pupils are motivated; that the initiative for the learning process comes from the pupil. Therefore this tenet of the New School define those who receives and guides the initiative of the motivated pupil into knowledge/practice/skills/wisdom as teacher.

== Democracy ==
In all New Schools there are a common place, now called the Ring, that functions as a kind of old Norse Thing, or parliament. Here all who works at the school contributes to the democratic arrangements of everyday life at the school. This implies that this is an assembly where the children/students always will be the majority in numbers. A school-meeting can by principle be summoned whenever someone wishes to do so. It is done by signaling with a bell, or by the help of an adult or elder pupil at the school. In practice anyone involved in the situation are obliged to meet. Once a week a regular school-meeting is held where issues of concern are discussed, processed and decided. The democratic school-meeting is in principle the highest organ. It is the intention that democracy is sought to be trained on an everyday level and that practical participation in the democratic development and arrangement of the school is one of the most vital tasks for schools in our time. Democracy is recognised as the primary tool to solve conflicts non-violently.

== Siblings groups ==
The New School's most distinctive mark is an organisational feature: The New School organizes groups with mixed age instead of the tradition inherited from the Prussian Military antecedent of the traditional public schools in the educational systems of the occidental world of the industrial age. There is still only one New School in Norway, but the school has many "siblings" in other countries based on similar concepts. The New School is a member of the international "New Education Fellowship". The current siblingsgroups at the primary school level are:

- Raba
- The Dust Rabbits
- The Reptiles
- The Phoenixes
- The Ocean

== Sources ==
Ny skole. For lærelyst og livsglede - Mosse Jørgensen 2005 - Eget Forlag
