= Heltberg School =

Gymnasium school in Norway

The Heltberg School, formally Heltberg and Reehorst Real and Latin School (Norwegian: Heltberg og Reehorst Real- og Latinskole), informally known as Heltberg's Student Factory (Norwegian: Heltbergs Studentfabrik), was a Norwegian gymnasium that offered a fast track to the examen artium university entrance exam which admitted pupils as students. It was founded by Henrik Anton Heltberg (1806–1873) and Wessel Joachim Andreas Reehorst (1824–1910) in 1846. It was Norway's best known intensive gymnasium in the 19th century, and was popular with pupils from the districts – i.e. the areas outside the capital of Christiania and its immediate surroundings. At the time schooling at this level was all private in Norway and the country had relatively few gymnasiums. Only a very small percentage, mainly men who intended to pursue a career as lawyers, physicians or priests, attended a gymnasium in preparation for taking the university entrance exam. The Heltberg School is famous is Norwegian cultural and literary history due to being attended by many notable figures such as Henrik Ibsen, Bjørnstjerne Bjørnson, Aasmund Olavsson Vinje and Jonas Lie. In Denmark and Norway pupils became students by virtue of passing the university entrance exam and thus being matriculated at the university, hence the school's nickname, Heltberg's Student Factory. Although himself never a student of Heltberg, Arne Garborg famously portrayed him in his novel Bondestudentar (1883). A similar school that existed 1915–1955, Haagaas School, was described by Mosse Jørgensen as "the new Heltberg [school]."
