= Adolph Tobias Herbst =

Danish naval officer

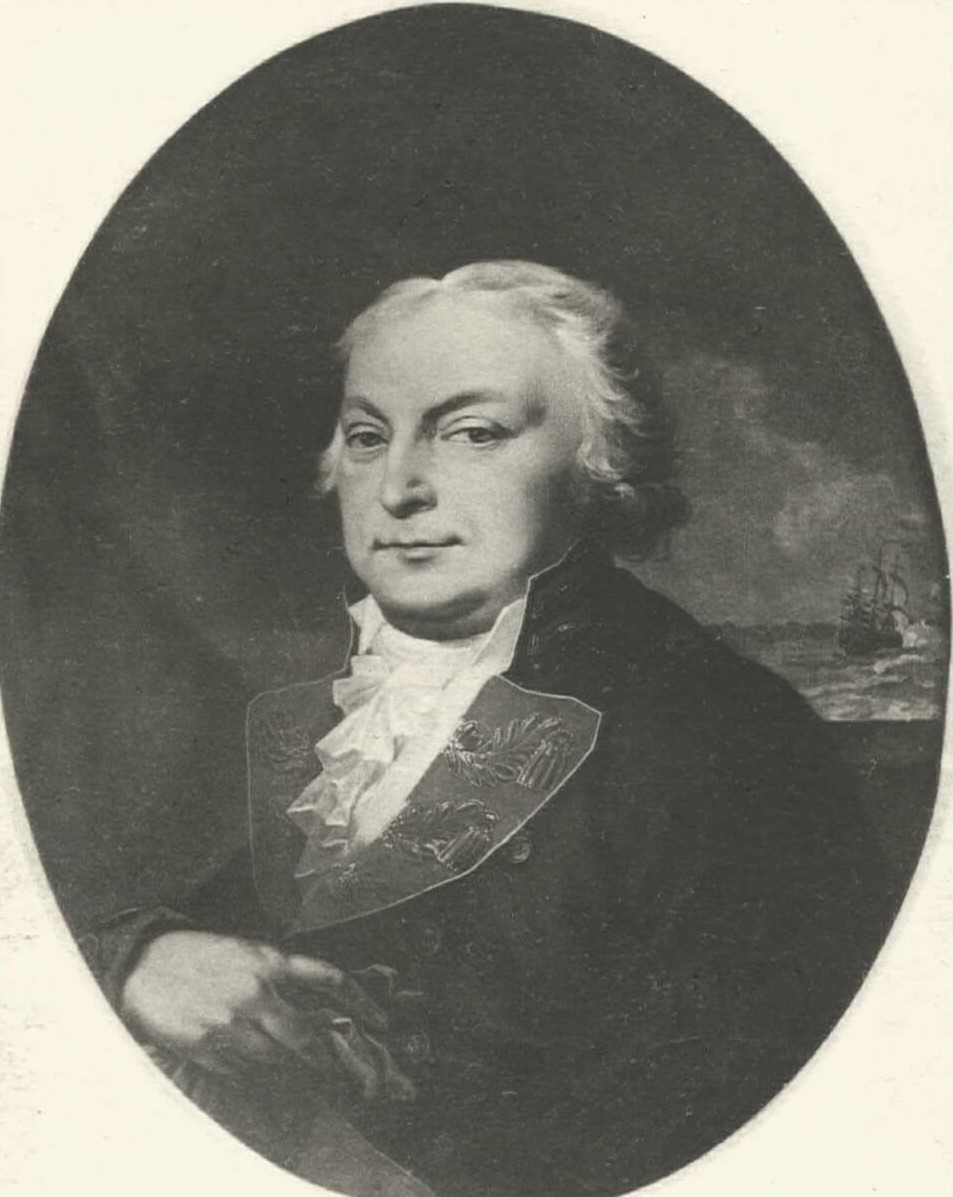
Adolph Tobias Herbst painted by C. A. Lorentzen.

Adolph Tobias Herbst (17 March 1746 – 20 August 1825) was a Danish naval officer who reached the rank of vice admiral in the Royal Danish Navy. In 1820, he was ennobled by Frederick VI. He was the paternal grandfather of archeologist Christian Herbst and sculptor Adelgunde Vogt.

== Earlylife ==
Herbst was born on 17 March 1746 in Copenhagen, the son of Schout-bij-nacht Michael Johan Herbst (1699–1762) and Engelke M. Liebe (c. 1715–1747).

== Career ==
Herbst became a cadet in 1757, second lieutenant in 1763 and first lieutenant in 1769.

In 1770-1771, he was second-in-command of the frigate Falster which joined the Mediterranean squadron. When the commander of the ship fell ill, Herbst took over the command of the ship on the return voyage. In 1771-1772, he returned to the Mediterranean. In 1773, he served as enrollment officer in Aalborg. In 1775–1776, he captained the schooner Støren. In the same year, he was promoted to captain lieutenant. In 1779–1783, he was first-in-command of the frigate St. Jan on another voyage to the Mediterranean with the annual presents to the rulers of the North African pirate States. In 1781, he was promoted to captain. From the Mediterranean, he continued to the Danish West Indies. On the voyage, in 1782, the ship was captured by two Spanish frigates and taken to Cádiz. After lengthy negotiations, it was finally possible to continue the voyage. On his return to Copenhagen, partly in appreciation of his conduct during the incident with the Spanish frigates, Herbst was appointed adjutant general to the king. He was later commander of a guard ship in the Øresund. In the following years, he was commander of changing ships in the Baltic squadron. In 1794, he became commander of a ship of the line in the squadron. He was also made a member of the Regulation Committee (1790), Construction Committee (1791) and chief of the dredging service (1794). In 1796, he was promoted to commodore. The year 1804 saw him promoted to division chief (divisionschef). In 1809, following the British confiscation of the Danish fleet after the Second Battle of Copenhagen and the outbreak of the Gunboat War, Herbst was put in charge of Prøvestenen with a number of barges and gunboats under his command. After the Gunboat War, he returned to the position as division commander.

== Personal life ==
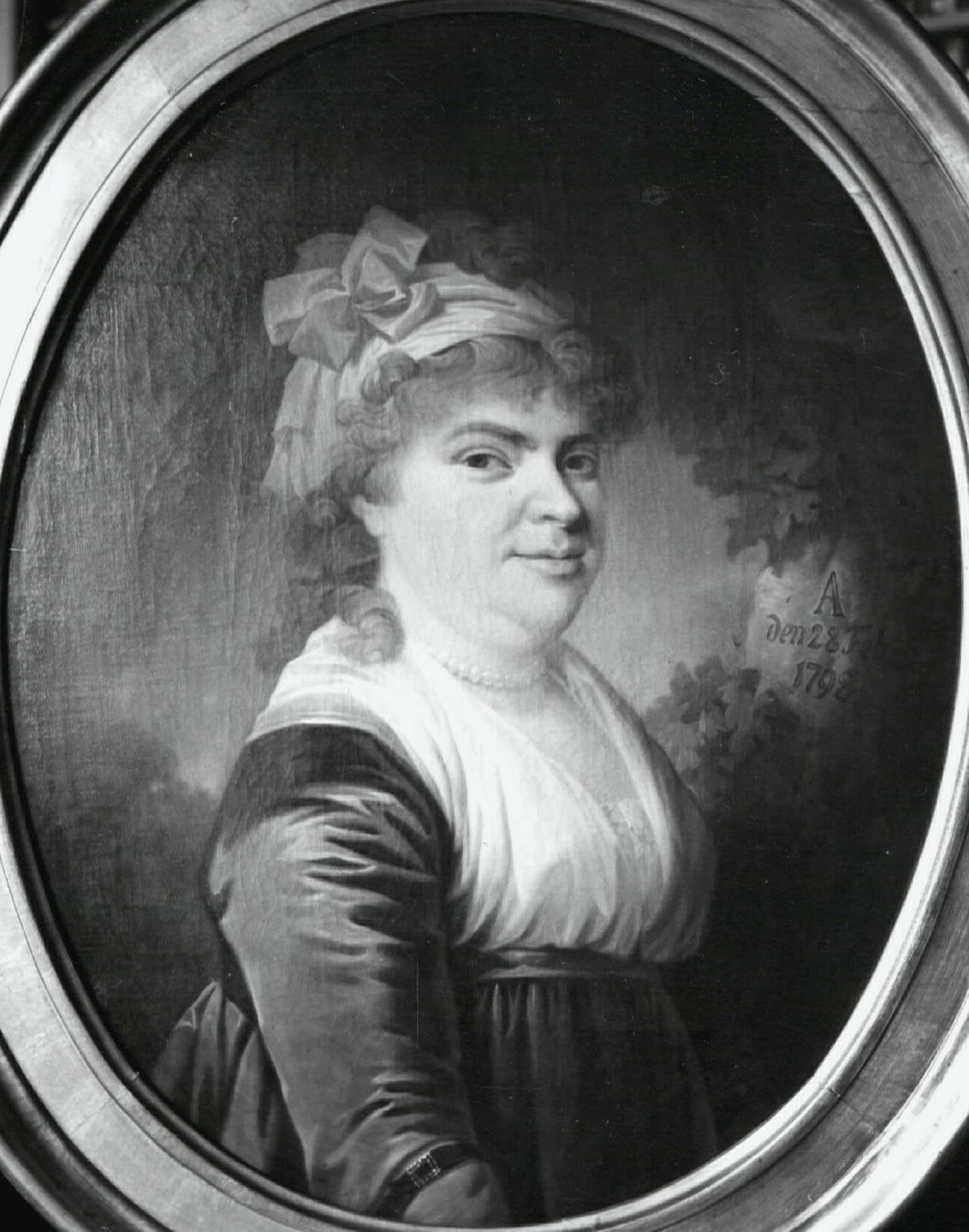
Anna Magdalene Rasch painted by C. A. Lorentzen.

On 16 May 1770, Herbst was married to Anne Magdalene Rasch (1746-1835). She was a daughter of regiment scribe Otto Christian Rasch (died 1748) and Frederikke Christiane Torm (1719–1773). Her maternal grandfather was chief of police in Copenhagen Erik Rorm. Together, Herbst and his wife were the parents of one son and one daughter. The son Michael Johan Christian von Herbst (1775-1830) served as director of the Royal Military Garment Factory. He was married to a daughter of the naval officer Andreas Henrik Stibolt and they were the parents of archeologist and numismatist Christian Herbst and sculptor Adelgunde Vogt (née Herbst). Herbst's daughter Frederikke Christiane von Herbst (1772-1831) was married to Pierre Paul Ferdinand Mourier.

In 1815, Herbst was created a Knight of the Order of the Dannebrog. In 1817, he was awarded the Cross of Honour. In 1820 he was admitted to the Danish nobility.

He died on 20 August 1825 in Copenhagen and is buried at Holmen Cemetery.
