= Haffner og Haagaas =

Norwegian series of textbooks in mathematics

- Author: Theodor Haagaas and Einar Haffner
- Genre: Mathematics
- Publication date: 1944

Haffner og Haagaas ("Haffner and Haagaas") was a Norwegian series of textbooks in mathematics published in numerous editions between 1925 and 1979, which were the most widely used textbooks in its field in Norwegian secondary schools for half a century. The series was originally edited by Theodor Haagaas and Einar Haffner, for whom it was named. Theodor Haagaas and Einar Haffner were joint editors from 1925 to Haffner's death in 1935, and Haagaas was sole editor from 1935 to 1959. In 1959, Harald Sogn replaced Haagaas as editor. The last editions were edited by Kjell Gjævenes. The series was originally published by H.J. Haffners Forlag, and was later published by N. W. Damm & Søn. Prior to 1940, some editions appeared under the title Haagaas og Haffner.
