= Tistedalen Murders =

Series of murders in Norway

The Tistedalen Murders occurred in 1991 and 1992 in Norway. Four people were killed by Roger Herbert Haglund in the space of one year.

== Crimes ==
On 3 September 1991, the siblings Aase Helene and Arne Odvar Nordby, aged 78 and 74, were murdered by multiple stab wounds across their bodies and then were robbed in their home in Tistedalen. In spite of a massive and prolonged criminal investigation, which included the arrests of two innocent persons, the case seemed destined to remain unsolved. There were few clues and no eyewitnesses. A few days previous to the crime however, the siblings had become concerned when they came across an unknown man in their garden. It was dark and they had been unable to recognize the man, who claimed to be looking for a dog.

One year later, on 1 September 1992, a 71-year-old pensioner in Tistedalen, Per Rød, was hit in the jaw with an iron bar, then stabbed to death and dumped in a compost pile in his garden. He was reported missing, but the police were unable to find a body, and so it remained a missing persons case for some time. The victim's car was found in a remote area and his hunting rifle was no longer hanging on the wall in his living room. It wasn't until March 1993 that two neighbours accidentally uncovered the body of Per Rød. It was discovered that he had been stabbed repeatedly. By now the police had four unsolved murders on their hands, as in the interim, on 23 December 1992, a 54-year-old food store manager named Karl Johan Hagevik was found shot in the back of the head in his car. The killer had not taken the victim's money, but instead grabbed Hagevik's bag consisting of three litres of milk. At this point this small urban area near Halden became the focal point of one of the most extensive police investigations in post-war Norway. When darkness fell Tistedalen was transformed into a ghost town, the population seemingly living in fear.

== Investigation ==
The police soon established a connection between the three murder cases, as the crimes apparently had been motivated by robbery. Evidence also suggested that the killer was also behind a recent bank robbery in Låby outside Halden. After months of painstaking investigation, carried out in cooperation with National Criminal Investigation Service, the police were able to apprehend Roger Herbert Haglund, a 55-year-old family man from Tistedalen, on 1 May 1993. The evidence against him was strong from the onset. Haglund's alibi did not hold up to scrutiny, and he was in dire financial straits. To the police investigators who interrogated him, Haglund came across as an unusually cold person. Confronted with the evidence the investigators had uncovered, Haglund confessed, then later retracted his confession, claiming that the infamous murderer and sex offender Edgar Antonsen, who had taken his own life the same year, had forced him to falsely confess to the crimes. When the trial began Haglund folded under the weight of the prosecutor's case, and he confessed again. Public prosecutor Lasse Qvigstad presented the accused as a cold and calculating man who murdered his defenceless victims, then took his time to look for valuables in their homes. Roger Herbert Haglund, who the court described as an "ice cold psychopath," was found guilty and on 26 April 1994 sentenced to 21 years in prison and 5 years preventive detention. The day after the sentencing it was uncovered that Haglund was planning to take a hostage and escape from prison armed with a fake dynamite stick, and he was immediately transferred to a maximum security prison.

During the investigation, Haglund was connected to an unusual brutal double murder in Sweden, committed a few years prior, but he was never prosecuted.

== Sentence and release ==
Haglund served 2 years of his sentence before being released on parole. By that time he was in poor health. He settled in Skedsmo, then moved to Strømmen, where he died, at the age of 73, on 9 December 2011.

== See also ==
- List of serial killers by country

== Bibliography ==
- Kåre Hunstad & Harald Haave: Drapene i Tistedal (Oslo, 1993)
