= Edgar Antonsen =

Norwegian serial killer and sex offender

- Born: 1940; Horten, Norway
- Died: 2 August 1993 (aged 53); Alta, Finnmark, Norway
- Cause of death: Suicide
- Other name: Olav Edgar Stensrud
- Convictions: Murder x3 Rape x2
- Penalty: Life imprisonment

Details
- Victims: 3+
- Span of crimes: 1962–1974
- Country: Norway, possibly elsewhere
- States: Vestfold, Møre og Romsdal
- Date apprehended: October 1974

Edgar Antonsen (1940 – 2 August 1993) was a Norwegian serial killer and rapist who was responsible for at least three murders and rapes committed in Vestfold and Møre og Romsdal from 1962 to 1974, some with the aid of his half-brother. Convicted and sentenced to life imprisonment in 1975, he was prematurely released in 1988 and committed suicide five years later to avoid an impending arrest for sexually abusing a young girl.

== Early life and crimes ==
Edgar Antonsen was born in 1940 in Horten. He spent his early childhood in Horten, with his parents frequently fighting and getting drunk. They eventually divorced when he was aged 10, resulting in Antonsen being sent away to a local orphanage, where he stayed for the next five years. At age 15, he escaped from the orphanage and soon found work as a sailor on a trade ship, travelling to locations such as England and Beirut, Lebanon. After spending four years at sea, Antonsen briefly returned to Norway where he married and had a child, but the couple divorced not long after.

From 1962 until the mid-1960s, he served in the Norwegian Armed Forces, and during this time, he remarried and had two children with his new wife. After completing his mandatory service, Antonsen returned to seafaring. In 1971, he was charged with several violent crimes, among which the rapes of his wife, sister, and a 15-year-old girl, for which he was subsequently convicted and given a 5-year prison term at the Ullersmo Prison. After his imprisonment, his wife divorced him, and using this fact to his advantage, he began answering lonely hearts ads posted in the newspaper. One of these ads was posted by a woman living in Ørsta, and after corresponding with her for some time, Antonsen decided to move there.

After being released on probation in the spring of 1974, he moved to Ørsta, where he found a job at a local knitting factory and eventually became engaged to the woman. While living there, Antonsen reconnected with his younger half-brother, 21-year-old Terje, a drug addict who had been detained in several youth detention centres throughout his teenage years. While Terje lived in nearby Ulsteinvik, he visited his older half-brother whenever he had free time, and they were often seen together.

== Murders ==
Antonsen's first confirmed murder took place in the summer of 1962, while he was on leave from the military. He briefly returned to his hometown of Horten, where he encountered his 80-year-old neighbour, Bertha Holten. She invited him inside her apartment, and once he was inside, Antonsen took a lamp cord and tied it around her neck in two knots, strangling her to death. After stealing 800 kroner (12 485,39 kr in November 2025) from the apartment, he exited the apartment without being seen. Not long after, Holten's body was found, but despite the suspicious circumstances, authorities erroneously concluded that her death was a suicide and closed the case.

After moving to Ørsta, Antonsen started committing new crimes with the help of Terje. In late July 1974, the two men were driving in a car when they chanced upon 31-year-old Oddbjørg Helene Jystad, a photographer from Oslo who was trying to hitchhike home after attending Moldejazz. They gave her a lift but soon drove to an isolated location where both brothers took turns raping her before Edgar ultimately strangled her to death. The pair then put her body in the trunk of the car and drove to Åndalsnes, where they hid it in a tunnel.

On 19 October, the pair were driving their car around Ørsta when they took notice of 12-year-old Bodil Brungot, who was hitchhiking home and partying at a disco with friends until the late evening hours. The Antonsen's brothers gave her a lift, and the moment she entered their car, Terje jumped in the back and held her while Edgar drove them to the rural area of Øyesetra. There, they broke into an abandoned cabin and took turns raping Brungot before Edgar ultimately strangled her. They then wrapped her body up in a woollen blanket and drove to the village of Store-Standal, where they buried her body in the sand.

== Investigation, arrest, and confessions ==
Following Brungot's disappearance, investigators from the Kripos were dispatched to locate the missing girl, but with no clues to aid them, an additional seven investigators from Volda joined in on the case. Soon after, a large search effort was undertaken by both the authorities and local volunteers, including a search for human remains at sea conducted by 18 divers and with the aid of a ship belonging to the Royal Norwegian Navy, the KNM Sarpen. However, despite their efforts, nothing new was uncovered about Brungot's whereabouts.

Six days later, an employee at the knitting factory in Ørsta contacted the police and told them that he had seen Brungot enter a car she believed belonged to two co-workers. The witness described the car as a white Ford Taunus 12M with black speed stripes along both sides. After hearing this, authorities immediately thought of Edgar Antonsen, since he was the only person in the area to own such a vehicle. Not long after, both of the Antonsen brothers were arrested on charges of deprivation of liberty, which they both stubbornly denied. In the following weeks, police continued gathering evidence in the case, further cementing the brothers' guilt after investigating a report about a burglary in a rural cabin: upon searching it, they found numerous items that were later identified as belonging to Brungot.

On 5 November, after being subjected to lengthy interrogations and suffering the effects of withdrawal, Terje broke down and gave a partial confession, admitting that he and Edgar had kidnapped, raped, and killed Brungot. He even indicated where they had buried the body, which was found shortly afterwards. To the investigators' shock, however, Terje made another confession implicating both of them in the rape-murder of Jystad months prior, accurately indicating where they had dumped her body as well. In late November, this was further reinforced when Jystad's camera, a rare Japanese model, was found approximately 800–900 meters away from the dormitory where Antonsen lived.

While awaiting formal charges for their crimes, a national newspaper, the Avisa Dagbladet, wrote an article in which they brought forward allegations that Edgar was responsible for murdering Holten, whose case was reopened and reclassified as a murder in 1971. In the article, the author wrote that the killing occurred while Antonsen was supposedly on unpaid leave for theft – upon reading this, he became infuriated and contacted lead investigator Leif Lier, requesting that the article be corrected in exchange for a confession in the case. Lier agreed, and after Avisa Dagbladet made a retraction, Antonsen made an official confession to killing Holten.

As a result of these confessions, investigators made attempts to connect the two brothers to any recent unsolved murders and disappearances they could. While they were able to rule them out in most, they believed that the Antonsen brothers might be responsible for the 20 July disappearance of 12-year-old Frode Fahle Ljøen. On the day of his disappearance, Ljøen was seen hitchhiking on the same road that Brungot would later be abducted from, and two witnesses later confirmed that they had seen him enter a car. Another witness said that, on the same night, he had observed two men digging in the nearby forest with a white car parked nearby, but after police searched the area, nothing was uncovered. Ljøen remains missing and is presumably deceased, and no definitive connection has been made between him and the Antonsens.

== Trial and imprisonment ==
The Antonsens' trial received extensive coverage in contemporary news media. Both of them were assessed for competency, with psychiatrists concluding that Edgar was an "incurable psychopath" who took pleasure in torturing people and animals, while Terje was simply easily manipulated and could be rehabilitated. During the trial, the two brothers constantly argued and blamed each other for the crimes, with Terje claiming that he was afraid of Edgar. Additionally, he claimed that his older brother had supposedly confessed to several additional murders in private, which occurred during his time as a sailor.

In the end, both brothers were found guilty and received life terms for their respective crimes: Edgar for the three murders and two rapes, and Terje for the murder of Brungot and complicity in the rape of Jystad.

== Release and suicide ==
Despite their harsh punishments, both brothers were later released from prison. Terje was released in 1981, was given a new identity, and permanently moved to Oslo, where he reportedly died in December 2015. Edgar was released on unsupervised parole in 1988 and moved to the village of Alta in Finnmark, changing his name to "Olav Edgar Stensrud". He lived in a small house isolated from any neighbours, and in his free time reportedly enjoyed painting roses on various objects and attending fairs and exhibitions.

For the following five years, the father of Bodil Brungot often received strange phone calls from northern Norway, in which the caller would often tell them what Antonsen was doing at any given time. On one occasion, the Brungots even visited their daughter's grave only to find it had been decorated with a large number of roses – when they asked friends and relatives if they had done it, they all replied in the negative.

In early August 1993, the Alta Police Department received a report that a man named 'Olav Stensrud' was wanted for the rape of a 10-year-old girl, allegedly the daughter of his supervisor. For the next two days, a search operation was initiated so they could locate the man, and on the final day, authorities found his body on some stones outside the village. Further investigation confirmed that the man was indeed Antonsen, and an autopsy concluded that he had taken his own life. Strangely, the Brungots had received another call just three days prior, informing them that their daughter's killer's days were near an end.

A few months after his death, Antonsen was posthumously accused of committing the so-called Tistedalen Murders by Roger Haglund, the man who was initially arrested in the case. He claimed that he had been forced into confessing to the crimes by Antonsen, but as the former was deceased by that time and with the introduction of evidence pointing towards his guilt, Haglund later retracted the statements and was subsequently convicted of the murders.

== See also ==
- List of serial killers by country
- List of serial rapists
