= Margrethe Parm =

Norwegian YWCA scout leader (1882–1966)

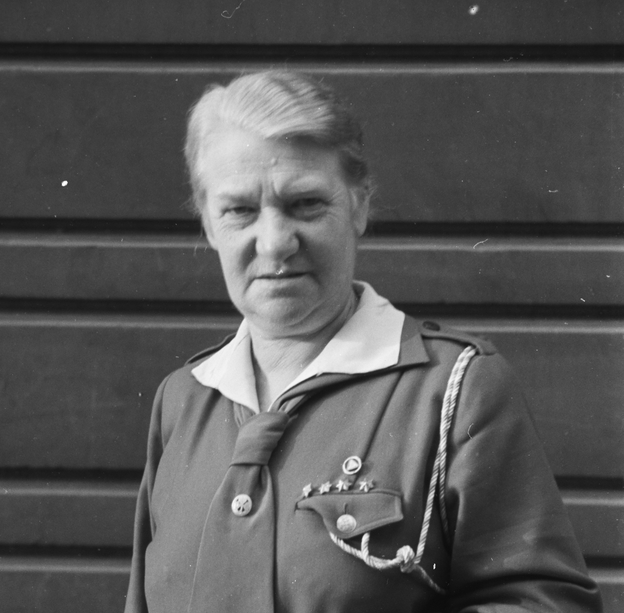
- Parm in 1940
- Born: Juline Margrethe Parm; 18 October 1882; Kristiania, Norway
- Died: 29 October 1966 (aged 84); Oslo, Norway
- Education: University of Oslo
- Occupations: Christian leader, YWCA scout leader, prison director
- Awards: King's Medal of Merit, Norway, 1945

Margrethe Parm (1882–1966) was a Norwegian Christian leader, teacher, scout leader and prison director. She founded Norway's YWCA Scouts in 1920.

== Early life and education ==
Juline Margrethe Parm was born on 18 October 1882 in Kristiania, the former name of the Norwegian capital, Oslo. She was the daughter of Carl Olaf Parm and Helga Margrethe Johannesen. She had two sisters, one dying in childhood. She attended several schools in Oslo and then studied for a year at the University of Oslo before going to Denmark in 1903 to work as a governess for a Danish family, staying there until 1905. In 1907, after recovering from an accident, she continued at the university, where she studied science until 1909. During her studies, she was active in the Norwegian Students' Christian Association, and was a board member and chairman of the Female Students' Club. She graduated as a teacher from the Hartvig Nissen School in 1910.

== YWCA career ==
After receiving her teaching qualification, Parm worked as a teacher at Nordstrand Middle School until 1915. She then went to the US on a scholarship from the YWCA's World Federation, studying for a year at the YWCA America's secretarial school in New York City, graduating in 1916. When she returned to Norway, Parm was employed as national secretary of the Norwegian Christian Youth Association, with the YWCA as her special area of responsibility. In 1919, together with Anne Katrine Bredvei, she drafted the first Norwegian scout law for women. She represented the YWCA on the Norwegian Women's National Council from 1919 to 1924.

In 1920, Parm believed that the time had come for a girl scout movement. In the summer of 1920, she arranged a scout camp for girls in Røldal Municipality and, on 3 November 1920, Norway's YWCA scouts were founded. She herself became the "scout leader", although the job title was later changed to "country manager". Parm served in this role until 1927. From 1922 to 1923 she was also the editor of the YWCA Scouts magazine. From 1920–26 she was a member of the committee of the World Association of Girl Guides and Girl Scouts and in 1927 she became general secretary of the world association, which took her out of Norway for five years, residing in London and Geneva. She was again on the committee from 1936 to 1940. She remained involved with the scout movement for the rest of her life, although scout work was banned during German occupation of Norway in World War II.

== Other activities ==
In 1946, Parm was appointed director of Bredtveit Prison, a women's prison that had been used as a political prison by the Nasjonal Samling during German occupation. She remained in the post until 1949. In parallel, she was a member of the Oslo Diocesan Council, and also chaired the Diocesan Council for a period. From 1949 to 1957 she was a member of the Voluntary Church Council. In 1948 she became a member of the Oslo Diocesan Council's committee for women's work in the church. She was also involved in local government politics as a member of the Oslo City Council, representing the Christian People's Party.

== Writing ==
Parm published a number of writings and books, among them a biography of Louise Isachsen, who was Norway's first female surgeon, who died in 1932. Her writings include:

- K.F.U.K.s historie [History of the YWCA]. 1926.
- Louise Isachsen: Mennesket og lægen [Louise Isachsen: The Woman and the Doctor]. 1933.
- Vår i sol og regn [Spring in sun and rain (Memoirs)]. Lutherstiftelsen. 1950.
- Veien går videre [The road goes on (Memoirs)]. Lutherstiftelsen. 1952.
- Målet i sikte [The goal in sight (Memoirs)]. Lutherstiftelsen. 1954.
- Liv og lek: små fortellinger [Life and play: brief stories]. Lutherstiftelsen. 1955.
- Jesus i Markus-evangeliet [Jesus in the Gospel of Mark]. Andaktsbokselskapet. 1956.
- Smått som blir stort: speiderminner [Small things that get big: scouting memories (Memoirs)]. Lutherstiftelsen. 1957.
- Under evige armer [Under Eternal Arms]. Lutherstiftelsen. 1958.
- Riket er ditt [The Kingdom is Yours]. Lutherstiftelsen. 1962.

Parm also issued an EP record called Elsker du Jesus? (Do You Love Jesus?).

== Awards and honours ==
Parm received the King's Medal of Merit in gold in 1945.

== Death ==
Parm died on 29 October 1966. She was buried at the Cemetery of Our Saviour in Oslo. Margrethe Parms vei, a road in the northeast of Oslo, was named after her.
