= Andreas Henrik Stibolt =

Danish naval officer

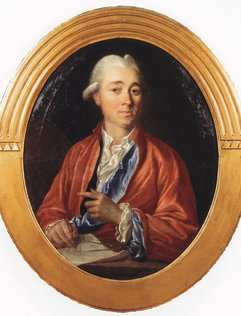
Andreas Henrik Stibolt.

Andreas Henrik Stibolt (10 May 1739- 5 June 1821) was a Danish naval officer and chamberlain. He headed the Royal Danish Naval Academy from 1782 to 1797. Prior to that he had seen service in the Mediterranean on board HDMS Delmenhorst and HDMS Sejeren and in 1770–71 with HDMS Prins Friderich in the squadron ordered to Algiers. Although highly commended by his senior officers, his later career as commander, and member of several naval commissions in Copenhagen, was blighted by a court martial concerning the supply of masts to the navy. He was a skilled painter and draughtsman. Some of his works are in the collections of the Museum of National History, Danish Maritime Museum and Royal Danish Naval Academy.He was the brother of master shipbuilder at Nyholm Dockyard Ernst Wilhelm Stibolt.

== Early life and education ==
Stibolt was born on 10 May 1739 on Christiansø, the son of commander captain Caspar Henrik Stibolt (1692–1779) and his second wife Catharina Harasoffsky de Arra (1711–82). Stibolt's father was commandant of Christiansø, a post which he hadinherited from his own father. His first wife was Charlotte Hedevig Becher (1710–26). In his two marriages, Stibolt's father was the father of 16 children, eight of whom became naval officers.

== Career ==
Stibolt became a cadet in 1755. junior lieutenant in, 1759, he was promoted steadily to senior lieutenant in 1763, captain lieutenant in 1770, captain in 1776 and commander captain in 1789.

In 1759–60 he was on the frigate Delmenhorst on tour in the Mediterranean Sea. From there he was transferred to the frigate Sejeren, bound for Morocco. In 1765, he returned to Marocco. now as part of Frederik Christian Kaas's diplomatic mission, on board an armed merchant ship. He was then commissioned as commander of different naval ships.

In 1772, he was appointed as inspection officer at Christianshavn Dry Dock. In 1774–81, he returned to active service at sea, commanding different naval ships. In 1781, he was appointed as supplies officer (ekvipagemester) at Gammelholm. In 1782, he was appointed as head of the Royal Danish Naval Academy. In the same year, he was also awarded the title of chamberlain (kammerherre).

He was a member of numerous commissions and court-martials. In 1781, he became a member of the Construction Naval Commission.

In 1797 a commission was set up to investigate possible embezzlement in connection with the supplu of masts for the navu during Stibolt's tenure as supplies officer at Gammelholm. Stibolt was not directly involved in the irregularities but was nonetheless sentenced to three months' imprisonment for negligence. He responded by handing in his resignation as head of the naval academy. He was awarded full pension.

== Painting and drawing ==
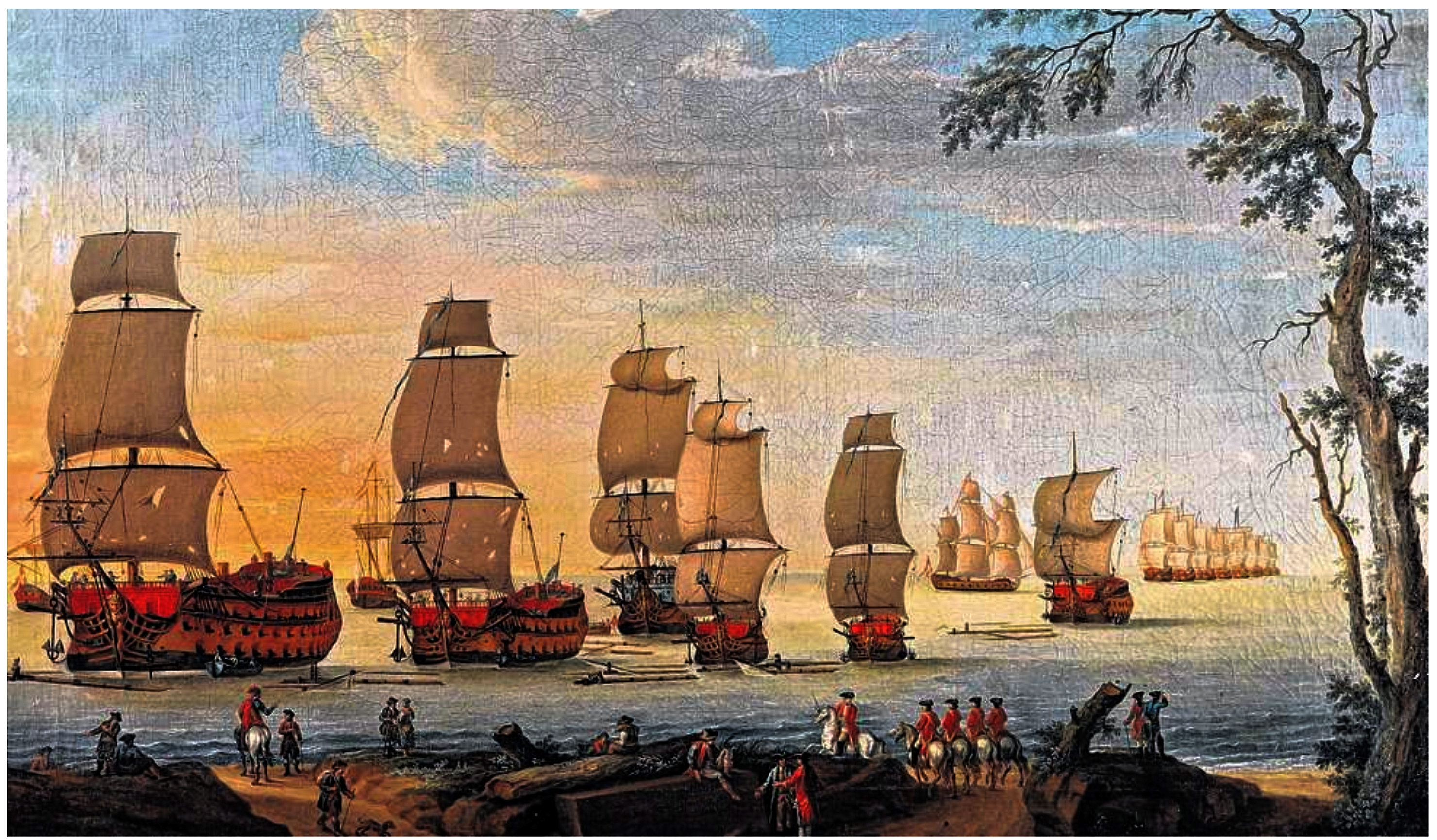
Stibolt: Seeschlacht auf der Kolberger Heide.

Stibolt was a skilled painter and draughtsman. Some his works were reproduced copperplate engravings by Johan Frederik Clemens for use in the training at the Rotal Danish Naval Academy. Some of Stibolt's works are in the collections of the Museum of National History in Gillerød, Danish Maritime Museum in Helsingør and the Royal Danish Naval Academy in Copenhagen.

== Personal life and legacy ==
Stibolt was married to Christiane de Hemmer on 8 September 1773. She was a daughter of plantation owner on Saint Croix in the Danish West Indies Jens Peter de Hemmer and Marie Marcoe. She gave birth to nine children. He was the maternal grandfather of archaeologist and numismatist Christian Herbst and sculptor Adelgunde Vogt (mée Herbst).

He was a member of the Royal Danish Agricultural Society. He was also co-founder of the Society for Civic Virtue (Borgerdydsselskabet, founded 15 April 1785) and the one who gave the opening speech..

Stibolt owned the country house Sømandshvile at Tungsted on the coast north of Copenhagen. He settled on the estate after handing in his resignation. In 1809, he moved to Langholmsgård at Frederiksborg. In 1711, he moved back to Copenhagen.
