= Anton Carl Ludwig von Tabouillot =

French officer, nobleman and counter-revolutionary

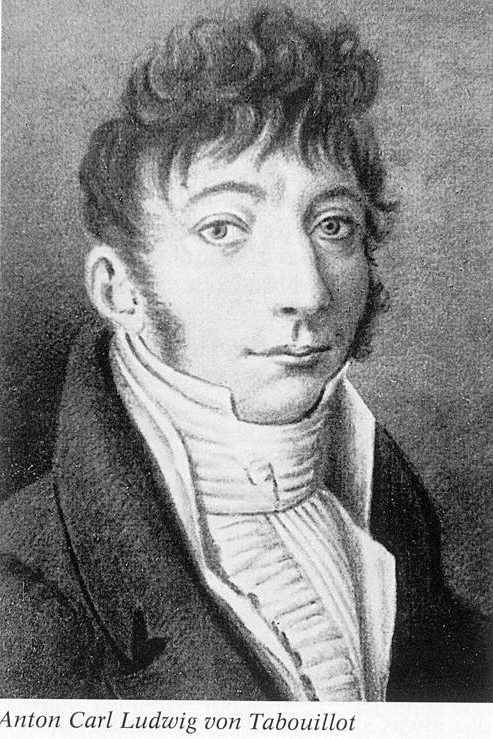
Anton Carl Ludwig von Tabouillot

Anton Carl Ludwig von Tabouillot (born 26 December 1775 in Verdun, died 17 February 1813 in Essen), né Antoine Charles Louis de Tabouillot, was a French officer, nobleman and counter-revolutionary, who later became a politician in the French satellite state, the Grand Duchy of Berg, where he served as Mayor of Essen under French rule during the Napoleonic Wars from 1811 to 1813.

== Career ==
He was a member of a French noble family and was the son of the conseiller du roi, prosecutor and police president of Verdun Louis François de Tabouillot (1733–1806) and Anne de Grandfèbre (1747–1794).

Before and during the French Revolution he was an officer of the French King's personal bodyguard Garde du Corps at Versailles and later of the royalist counter-revolutionary Armée des Princes. He fled from France during the Reign of Terror in 1793, after his mother had been executed by guillotine in Paris. He was appointed an officer in the Prussian Army by special royal decree in 1795 and recognised as noble in the Kingdom of Prussia.

After Essen became part of the Grand Duchy of Berg, a French satellite state, during the Napoleonic Wars, he was appointed as the city's mayor in 1811, but died two years later.
