= Veden Manor =

Building in Halden, Norway

Coordinates: 59.1308°N 11.4506°E

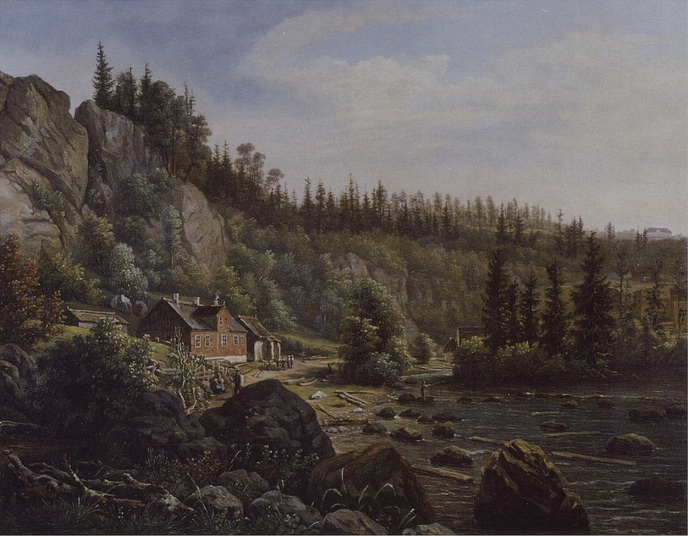
Tistedalen painted by Jens Peter Møller, with Veden Manor in the background to the right

Veden Manor (Norwegian: Veden hovedgård or Veden gård, also spelled Veen) is a manor in Tistedalen in Halden, Norway, and a former privileged noble estate.

== History ==
The manor was a privileged noble estate (setegård) until the 1821 Nobility Law abolished this privilege in the 19th century, and was notably owned by the Norwegian chancellor Jens Bjelke and his descendants. It once included the main estate and 13 other farms, as well as 11 sawmills. Over time, much of the agricultural land was sold, but the manor's economic importance rested chiefly on its sawmills.

The manor and its surroundings have been painted by several prominent painters. Following a visit by Crown Prince Regent Frederick in 1788, he sent Erik Pauelsen to paint the view from the manor. Other artists who visited the manor and painted motifs from Veden include Jens Peter Møller, Heinrich Grosch, Ferdinand Gjøs, Thomas Fearnley, and Johannes Flintoe.

During the Swedish–Norwegian War in 1814, Swedish Crown Prince Carl Johan stayed at the manor. The owner, the widow Ziegler, was forced to have him as a guest. Carl Johan wanted to buy the manor, but found the price too high. In 1851, the manor was sold to foundry master Johannes Petterson, and some years later, it was sold to a consortium of sawmill and land owners who formed the Sawmill Corporation in 1859, a trust that became the largest sawmill company in Norway. The manor house was then used by various directors of the company. Veden Manor was owned by the Sawmill Corporation and its successor Norske Skog until around 2000.

== Owners ==
- Privy Councillor Vincens Lunge (ca. 1486–1536)
- Dorothea Juel and Henrik Brockenhuus (1542–1588)
- Sophie Brockenhuus and Jens Bjelke (1580–1659) (daughter and son-in-law of the former owners)
- Dorothea Bjelke and Daniel Knudsen Bildt (1602–1651) (daughter and son-in-law of the former owners)
- Knud Danielsen Bildt (1631–1689) (son of the former owners)
- Judge Niels Kjeldsen Stub (1637–1721)
- Timber merchant Peder Colbjørnsen (1683–1738)
- Timber merchant Hans Colbjørnsen (1680–1754) (brother of the former owner)
- Merchant Thomas Blixenskiold (brother-in-law to the two former owners)
- Christopher de Schøller (1707–1774) (son-in-law of the former owner)
- Governor and Chamberlain Christopher Schøller Bülow (1770–1830) (maternal grandson of the former owner)
- Lieutenant Tycho Castberg
- City clerk Herman Ziegler (–1807)
- Ziegler's widow (–1840)
- Svend Nielsen Jacobsrød
- Torgal Nielsen
- Foundry master Johannes Petterson (1818–)
- The Sawmill Corporation/Norske Skog
- BKE Eiendom
