= Tistedalen =

Part of Halden in Østfold, Norway

Coordinates: 59°08′N 11°27′E

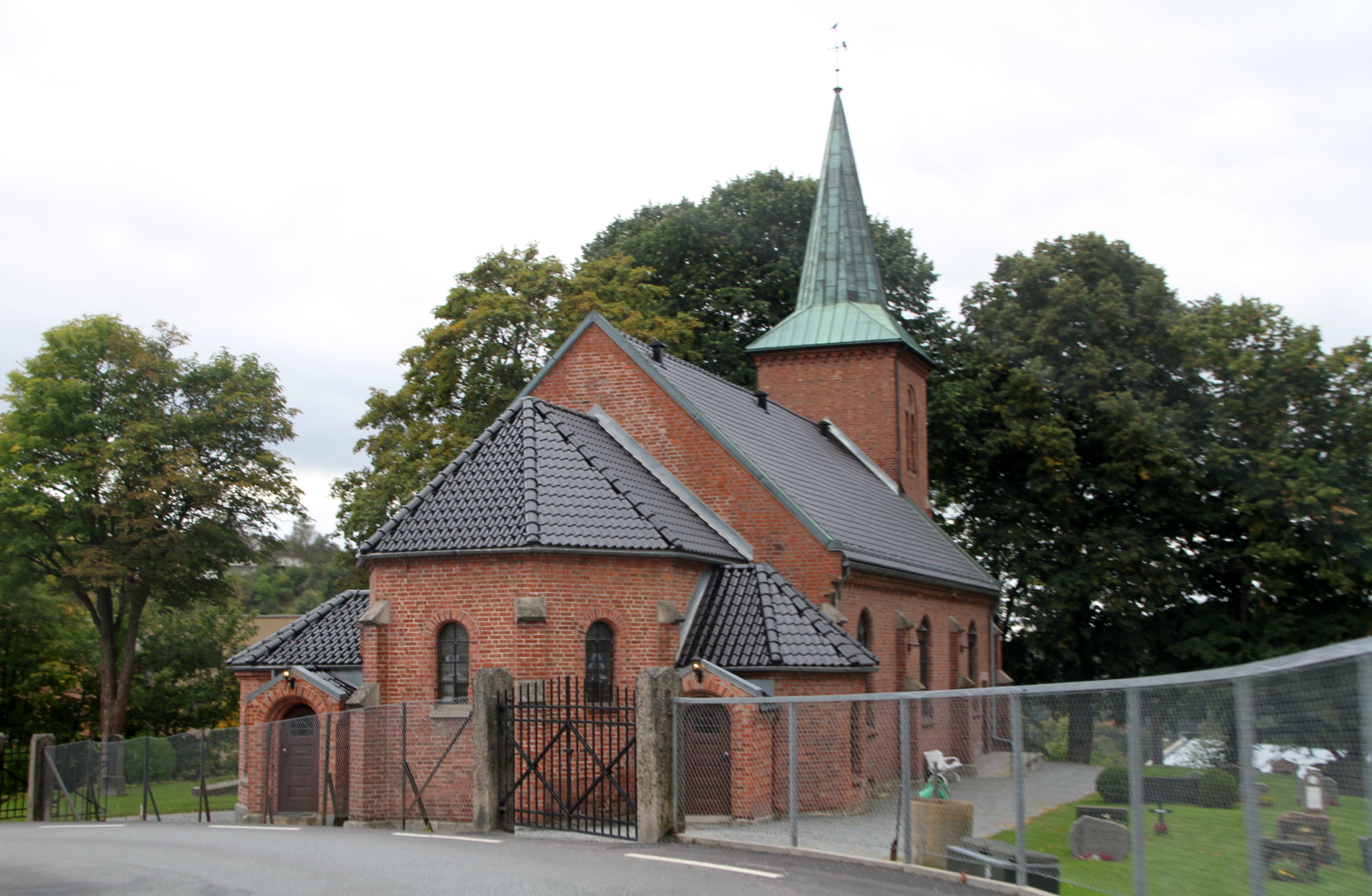
Tistedal Church

Tistedalen is a part of Halden in Østfold, Norway. Originally located four kilometers from the city center, the area started growing up around the sawmill industry and has now been engulfed by Halden, although it still maintains some separate identity.

Traditionally, Norway's largest sawmill industry was located in Tistedalen. In the 20th century, Tistedalen became a classic working class community, surrounded by small factories. There is some presence of different religious groups.

In 1991 and 1992 Tistedalen had four brutal murders. Tistedalen suddenly got into the focus of the media, due to one of the worst murder cases in Norwegian history. In 1994, a local man, Roger Haglund, was sentenced for the Tistedalen Murders. The name Tistedal comes from the river "Tista" and "dal" meaning the valley. It is also called Tistdærn by the locals.
