= Jens Peter Møller =

Danish painter (1783–1854)

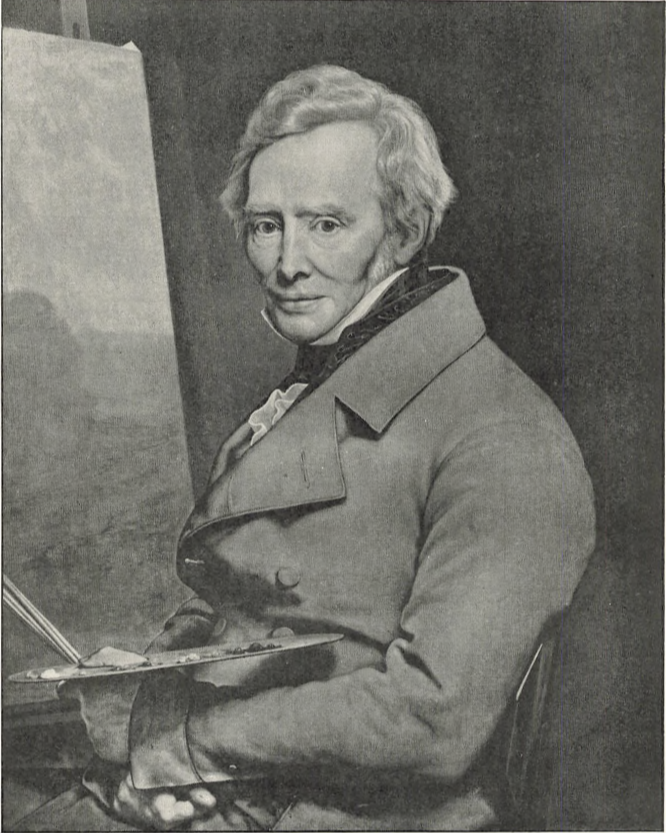
Jens Peter Møller painted by David Monies.

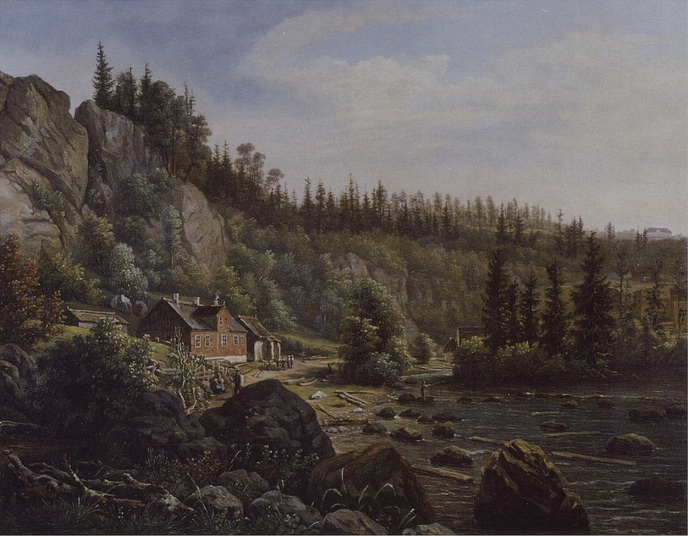
Tistedalen, Norway

Jens Peter Møller (4 October 1783 Faaborg – 29 September 1854) was a Danish painter.

== Early life ==
Møller was a landscape painter and the son of a potter. He was born in Faaborg and grew up with a relative in Eckernförde in Schleswig. Together with his fellow painter and friend Christoffer Wilhelm Eckersberg Møller moved to Copenhagen in 1803 to study at the Royal Danish Academy of Fine Arts. At the Academy he won the silver medal and was the first student of Nicolai Abildgaard and later was taught by Christian August Lorentzen.

== Career ==
Christian VIII of Denmark supported Møller as a patron. At the same time Møller decided to learn how to restore paintings In 1810 he received a travel grant partly by the Prince's support. Møller first traveled to Brussels and from there to Paris. In Paris he studied partly its technical subject and partly made landscape studies of nature by copying examples of works by Claude Lorrain. Here Møller again met Eckersberg and lived with him in 1813 when the latter traveled to Rome.

As early as 1814 Møller had been appointed curator at the royal collection of paintings and was for some years a drawing teacher for midshipmen. From 1841 he also supervised the paintings on the royal castles. Møller received the medal "Ingenio an arte" in 1842 for a difficult restoration of Queen Caroline Amalie's portrait. From 1834 he was also curator (inspector) of Count Carl Moltke's painting collection.

At the Christiansborg Palace Møller painted his four major landscapes from Switzerland and Tyrol. The Royal Painting Collection owns eight of his pictures. Møller was also a conscientious teacher for the younger landscape painters at the Academy and introduced cash prizes in landscape art.
