= Frogner School =

Secondary school in Oslo, Norway

Coordinates: 59.9182°N 10.7160°E

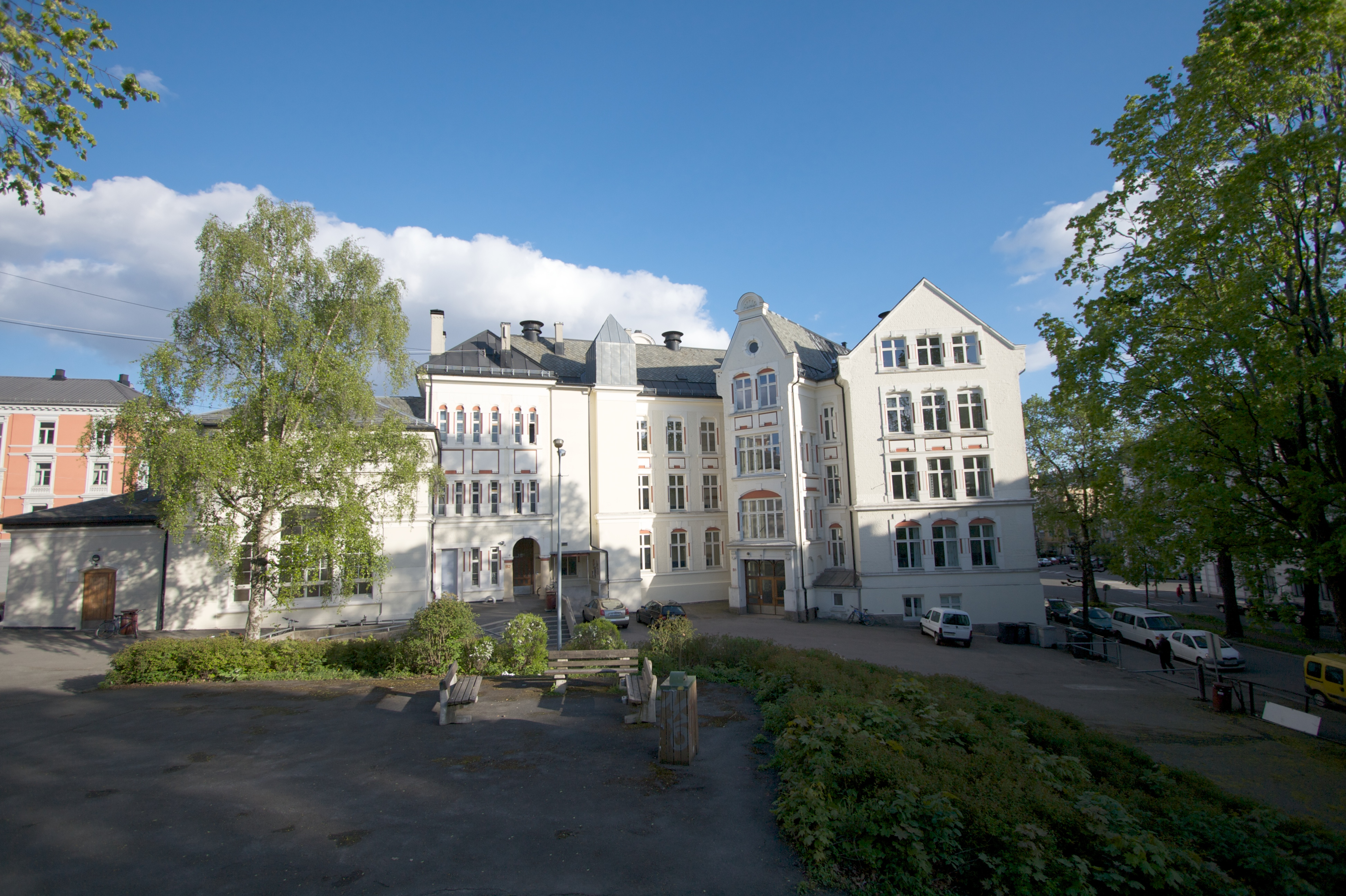

Location
- Niels Juels gate 52; Frogner, Oslo

Information
- School type: Private, from 1918 public, secondary school
- Motto: NON SCHOLAE, SED VITAE
- Founded: 1869
- Closed: 1970

Frogner School (Norwegian: Frogner Høiere Almenskole and subsequently Frogner Realskole og Gymnas, commonly known as Frogner skole) was a secondary school at Frogner in Oslo, Norway.

The school was a continuation of the Gjertsen School, which had been founded in 1869. Gjertsen School moved from St. Olavs Plads to Niels Juels Gade at Frogner in 1899 and was renamed Frogner School in 1900. The school included a Realskole and a Gymnasium, which prepared pupils for the university entrance exam. As it was a private school and located in the wealthy borough of Frogner, and also because few people attended either Realskole or Gymnasium in those times, it almost exclusively served the higher bourgeoisie. The school was sold to Christiania municipality in 1918, and was closed in 1970. Its building in Niels Juels gate 52 was subsequently taken over by its neighbour, the Hartvig Nissen School.
