= Mosse Jørgensen =

Norwegian school principal and non-fiction writer

- Born: 3 January 1921; Kristiania, Norway
- Died: 30 June 2009 (aged 88)
- Occupations: School principal and non-fiction writer
- Awards: Medal of St. Hallvard (1993)

Mosse Jørgensen (3 January 1921 – 30 June 2009) was a Norwegian school principal and non-fiction writer.

She is especially remembered as a co-founder and the first principal of a reformed secondary school in Oslo in 1967, Forsøksgymnaset. She published the book Kunsten å overleve med en tenåring i huset in 1969. Her book Fra skoleopprør til opprørsskole from 1971 was translated into eight languages. She was awarded the Medal of St. Hallvard in 1993, and the Ole Brumm prize in 1998.

== See also ==
- The New School Foundation
