= Carl Otto Løvenskiold (born 1953) =

Norwegian landowner and businessperson (born 1953)

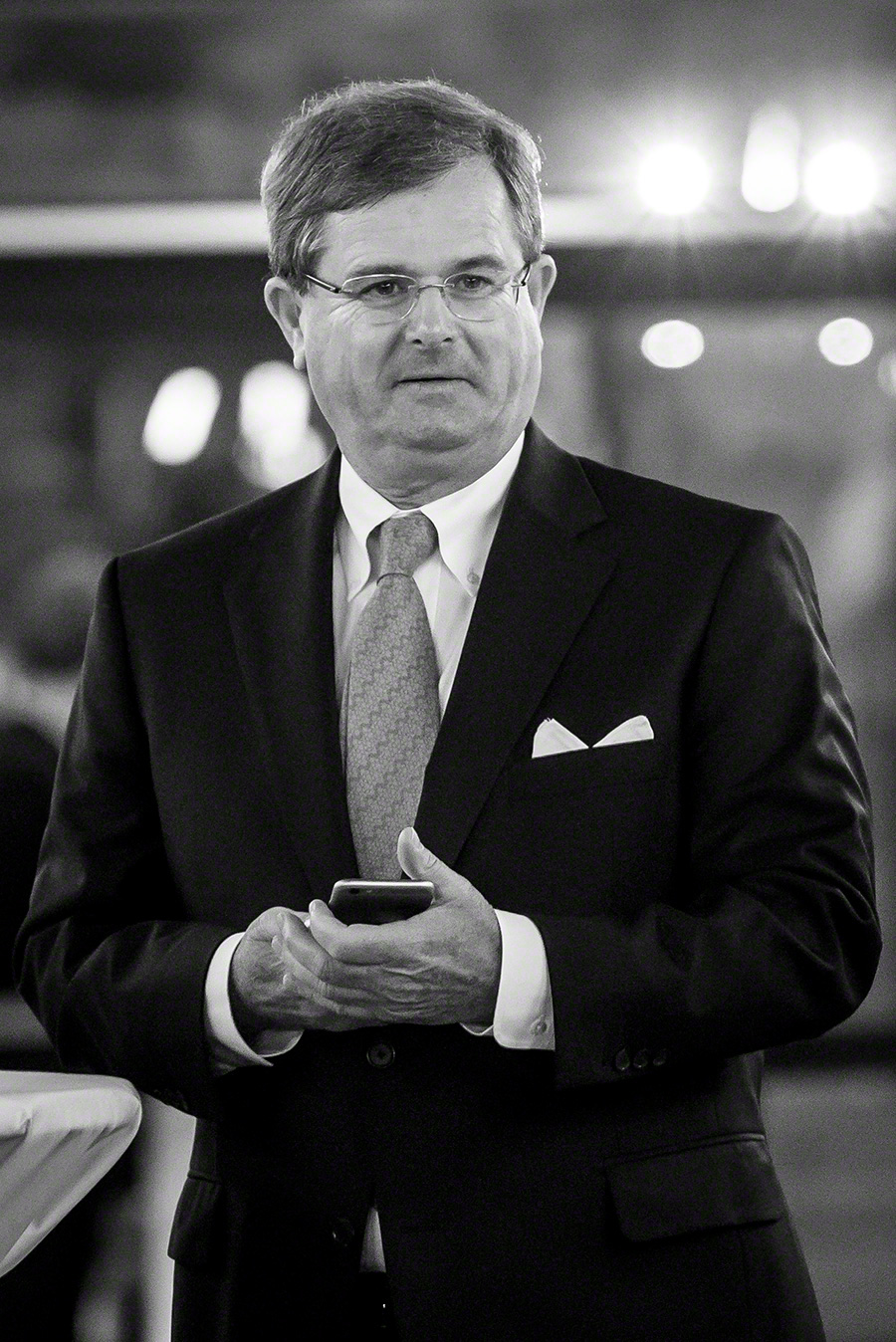
Løvenskiold in 2016

Carl Otto Løvenskiold (born 18 October 1953) is a Norwegian landowner and businessperson. By birth, he is a member of Løvenskiold noble family.

== Personal life ==
He is a son of Harald Løvenskiold and Ingegjerd Løvenskiold, grandson of Carl Otto Løvenskiold, great-grandson of Harald Løvenskiold, great-great-grandson of Prime Minister Carl Otto Løvenskiold, great-great-great-grandson of Otto Joachim Løvenskiold and great-great-great-great-grandson of Severin Løvenskiold. He is the oldest of four siblings. He resides at Bærums Verk Manor, is married to Lise and has two children.

== Career ==
He graduated as an economist from the Seattle University in 1978, and also took an MBA degree in France and leadership education at Stanford University. He worked in Nitro Nobel before being hired in the family corporation Løvenskiold-Vækerø in 1982. He advanced through the ranks to become chief executive of the industry and commercial branch of the company in 1993. At his father's passing in 1994 he became sole owner of the entire corporation. The estates owned by the corporation span large parts of Bærums Verk, Bærumsmarka and Nordmarka.

From 2003 to 2011 he was also the president of the Federation of Norwegian Enterprises.

Business positions
Preceded by Eigil Thorberg	President of the Federation of Norwegian Enterprises; 2003–2011	Succeeded by Sverre Leiro
