= Harald Løvenskiold =

Norwegian landowner and businessperson

Harald Løvenskiold (9 February 1926 – 28 January 1994) was a Norwegian landowner and businessperson.

== Personal life ==
He was born in Aker as a son of landowner Carl Otto Løvenskiold, member of Løvenskiold family and Henny Størmer. Harald was a maternal grandson of Carl Størmer paternal grandson of Harald Løvenskiold, great-grandson of Prime Minister Carl Otto Løvenskiold, great-great-grandson of Otto Joachim Løvenskiold and great-great-great-grandson of Severin Løvenskiold.

He married Ingegjerd Ebba Dagmar Andvord, a daughter of ambassador Rolf Andvord. They had the son Carl Otto Løvenskiold.

== Career ==
Harald Løvenskiold finished his secondary education in 1944, and subsequently graduated from Brown University in 1949, however prior to his graduation from college, he took commerce school and forestry school. Aside all that, he also held the Lieutenant degree.

In 1947 he became partner in the family corporation Løvenskiold-Vækerø. From 1951 he also led the iron works Bærums Verk. In 1962 he became sole owner of 1962. Decades later in particular 1993, he passed control of the industrial and commercial activities in Løvenskiold-Vækerø to his son who consequently took over as sole owner when Harald died in 1994.

In addition, he chaired Casco Norsk, Tomten, Norske Dører, Bærums Verk and Bærums Jernoplag. He was a board member of Federation of Norwegian Industries, Skogbrukets Landsforening, Cellulosefabrikkenes Felleskontor, Scankraft, Hunton Bruk and Billedbladet Nå. He was a member of the gentlemen's club SK Fram since 1971.
