= Carl Otto Løvenskiold (1898–1969) =

Norwegian landowner and businessperson

Carl Otto Løvenskiold (27 August 1898 – 22 August 1969) was a Norwegian landowner and businessperson.

== Personal life ==
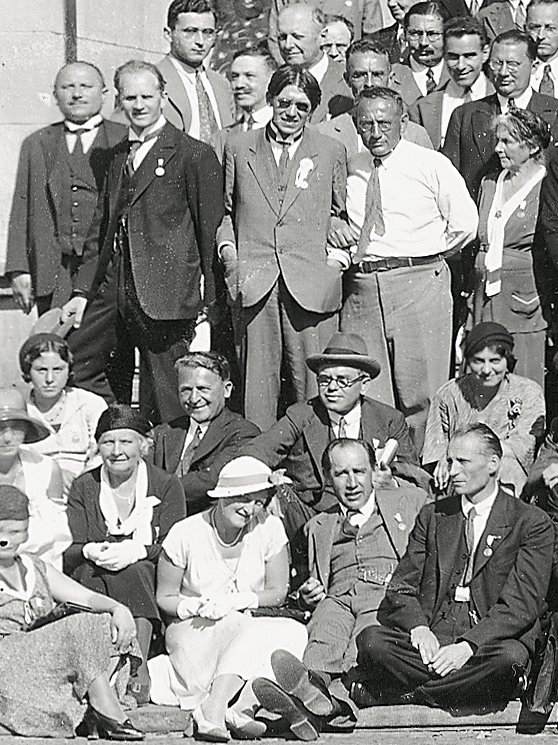
Ms. Lövenskiold (sitting in the middle, white hat), accompanying her mother (sitting left, dark suit) and father (middle of top row, bald) at the International Congress of Mathematicians, Zürich 1932

He was born in Aker as a son of nobleman and landowner Harald Løvenskiold (1868–1934) and Dorothea Christine Blom. He was a grandson of Prime Minister Carl Otto Løvenskiold, great-grandson of Otto Joachim Løvenskiold, great-great-grandson of Severin Løvenskiold and second cousin of Carl Axel Løvenskiold.

In 1922 he married Henriette "Henny" Adelaide Størmer, a daughter of Carl Størmer. They had the son Harald Løvenskiold who married Ingegjerd Andvord and had the son Carl Otto Løvenskiold.

== Career ==
He finished his secondary education in 1917. He then attended Treider School, studied forestry at Yale University and in Nancy, and also took conscript officer training. He reached the rank of Premier Lieutenant in 1927 and Captain in 1931.

He was a forestry manager for Hakedals Verk from 1921, then property administrator for his father from 1928. He became a partner in the family corporation Løvenskiold-Vækerø in 1933, was sole owner from 1935 to 1947, and then co-owner together with his son until 1962. He was also chief executive of Bærums Verk.

He chaired the Oslo–Lommedalen bus route, was a board member of Hunton Bruk, National Papemballageindustri, Dalen Cementvarefabrik and was a supervisory council member of Schøyens Bilcentraler, Gjensidige, Forsikringsselskapet Norden, Andresens Bank, Akers Sparebank, the Norwegian America Line, Søndenfjeldske Norske Dampskibsselskab and SS Garonne. He was a deputy board member of Bank of Norway. He also chaired Vestre Bærum Conservative Party from 1930 to 1934. He was a member of the gentlemen's club SK Fram since 1939.

He was decorated with the Defence Medal 1940–1945 and as a Knight, First Class of the Order of the Dannebrog. He died in August 1969.
