= Otto Joachim Løvenskiold =

Norwegian politician (1811–1882)

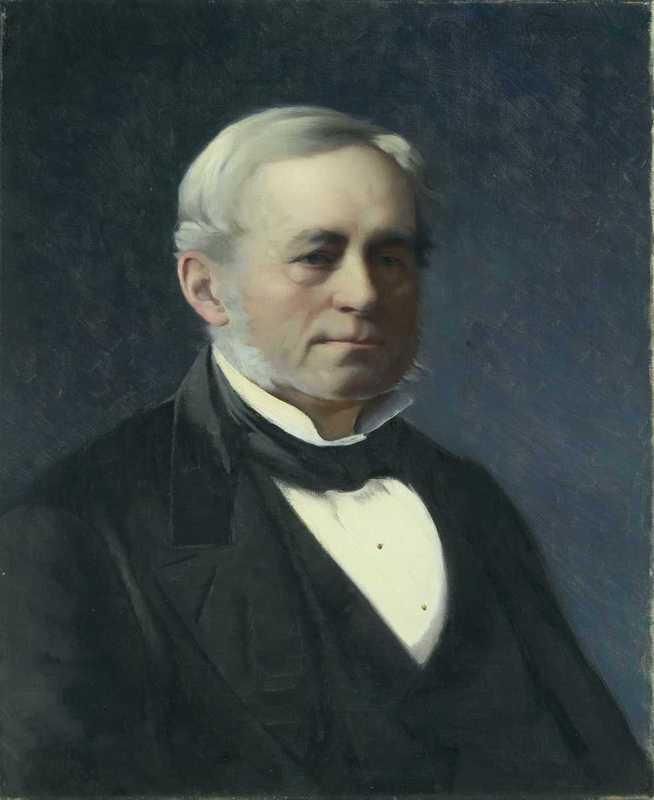
- Portrait of Løvenskiold, painted by Asta Nørregaard

Member of the Parliament of Norway
- In office 1871–1880

Mayor of Kristiania
- In office 1869–1876
- Preceded by: Carl Johan Michelet
- Succeeded by: Anders Sandøe Ørsted Bull

Personal details
- Born: 14 May 1811 Fossum, Gjerpen, Denmark–Norway
- Died: 4 August 1882 (aged 71) Kristiania, Norway
- Spouse: Julie Caroline Helene Wedel-Jarlsberg
- Relatives: Severin Løvenskiold (father); Carl Otto Løvenskiold (son); Harald Løvenskiold (grandson)

Otto Joachim Løvenskiold (14 May 1811 – 4 August 1882) was a Norwegian judge and politician. He served three terms in the Parliament of Norway, and served as Mayor of Kristiania from 1869 and 1876. He was a Supreme Court Justice from 1854 to his death. By birth, he was a member of the Løvenskiold noble family.

== Personal life ==
He was born at Fossum in Gjerpen (now part of Skien Municipality) as a son of Governor-general of Norway Severin Løvenskiold (1777–1856). He was a grandnephew of Bartholomæus Herman Løvenskiold, great-grandson of Herman Løvenskiold and nephew of Fritz Løvenskiold.

In September 1837 in Sem Municipality, he married Julie Caroline Helene Wedel-Jarlsberg, a daughter of Count Johan Caspar Herman Wedel-Jarlsberg and Karen Christiane Andrea Anker. His wife died already in 1840, only 34 years old. Løvenskiold then married Eleonora Mansbach (1825–1869) in August 1845 in Frederikshald. She was a daughter of Lieutenant General and politician Carl von und zu Mansbach and his wife Anna Sophia Maria Anker. Their son Herman Severin Løvenskiold (1838–1910) became a colonel by rank, and served as Lord Chamberlain of Norway. Another son Carl Otto Løvenskiold (1839–1916) became Prime Minister in Stockholm.

Through them, Otto Joachim was a grandfather of Carl Løvenskiold and Harald Løvenskiold, and a great-grandfather of Carl Axel Løvenskiold and Carl Otto Løvenskiold, Jr.

== Career ==
Løvenskiold took his secondary education in Skien, together with Anton Martin Schweigaard and Peter Andreas Munch. He finished school in 1828, then enrolled in higher education and took the cand.jur. degree in 1834. He worked as a junior solicitor, as secretary in the Supreme Court of Norway and as an audit in the Artillery Brigade. He was appointed as deputy under-secretary of state in the Ministry of Finance in 1847, and in 1854 he became an Assessor in the Supreme Court.

He started his political career as Mayor of Kristiania, a position he held from 1869 to 1876. He was elected to the Parliament of Norway in 1871, representing the constituency of Kristiania, Hønefos og Kongsvinger. He was re-elected in 1874 and 1877. He stood for the election of 1880, but failed as he did not receive enough votes in a primary election in 1879. Løvenskiold's exit from national politics came as a hard blow to his career. He had rejected an offer to become Minister of Justice in the 1870s, citing his wish to conduct parliamentary work instead, and in 1877 he had rejected an offer to become Chief Justice of the Supreme Court of Norway for the same reason.

In 1879, he received the dr.juris degree at the University of Copenhagen. In 1881, he became the praeses of the Royal Norwegian Society of Development. He was also chairman of the Norwegian Association of Hunters and Anglers, and a board member of Den norske Håndverks- og Industriforening and a member of Det skandinaviske Selskab. He died in August 1882 in Kristiania.

Political offices
Preceded by Carl Johan Michelet	Mayor of Oslo (Kristiania); 1869–1876	Succeeded by Anders Sandøe Ørsted Bull
