= Vognserup =

Listed manor house in Knudby, Denmark

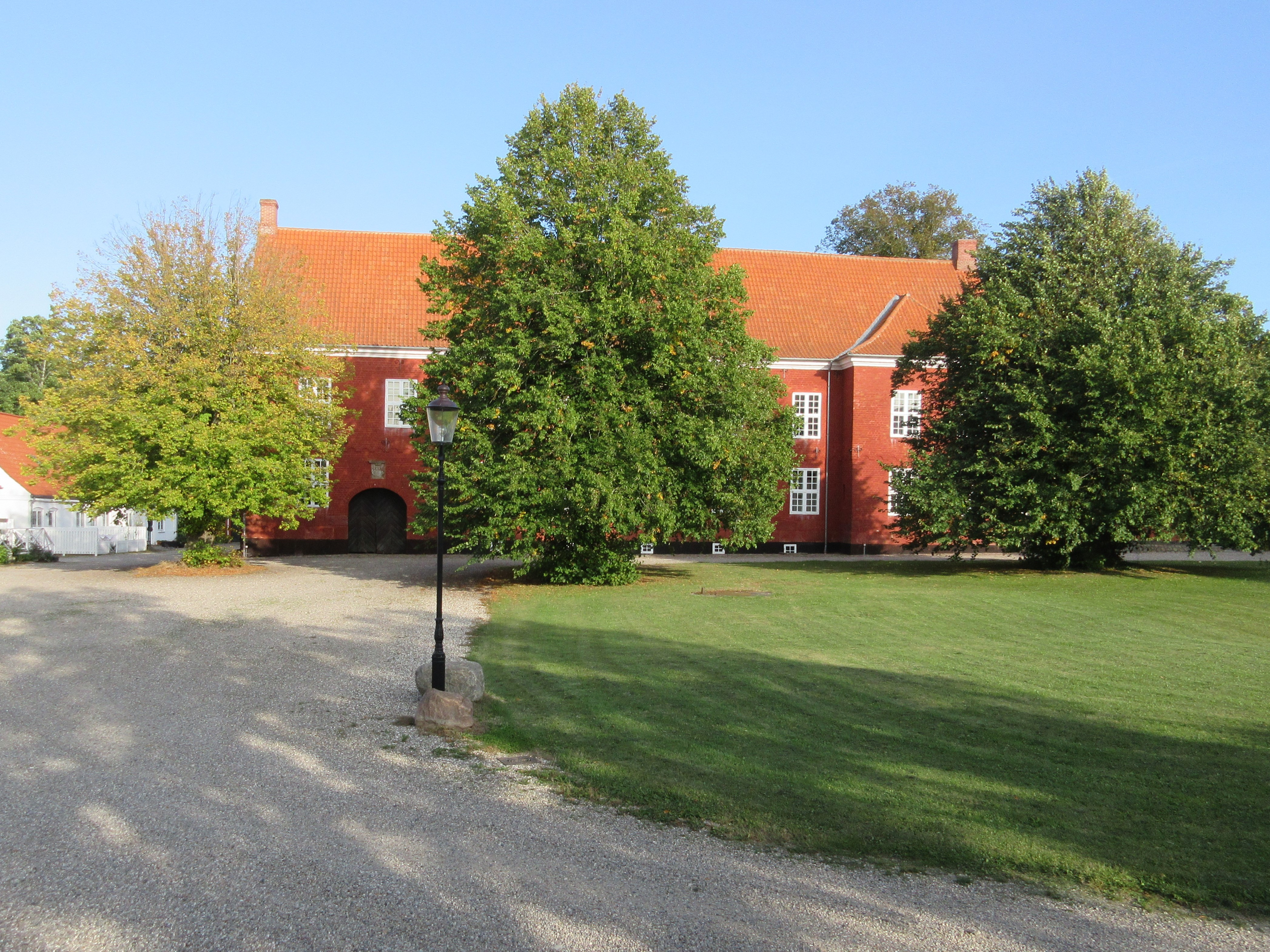
- Interactive map of the Vognserup area

General information
- Location: Vognserup 3; 4420 Regstrup, Denmark
- Coordinates: 55°42′30.96″N 11°33′27″E

Vognserup (Danish: Vognserup Gods) is a listed manor house located in the parish of Knudby to the west of Holbæk, Denmark. The main building was built between in 1559-1575 in Dutch Renaissance style.

== History ==
Vognserup was established in 1330 at the site of a former village. It was owned by the now extinct Rud family in the Middle Ages. Peter Rud, a friend of king Frederick II, died in 1559. His widow Grethe Bruske constructed the current main building in c. 1559-75.

Im 1750, Vognserup was acquired by Severin Løvenskiold (1719–1776). Severin Løvenskiold had inherited Birkholm Manor and Aggersvold as well as several iron works in Norway. In 1766 he created the 'stamhus' Løvenborg from his estates and in 1773 it received the status of Barony. The Barony of Løvenborg was dissolved in 1921 existed until 1921 as a result of the lens release (lensafløsningen) of 1919. ·

== Estate ==
The estate covers 358 hectares. It consists of 271 hectares of farmland, 29 hectares of meadows, 45 hectares of forest, 8 hectares of marshland and a 5-hectare park.

== List of owners ==
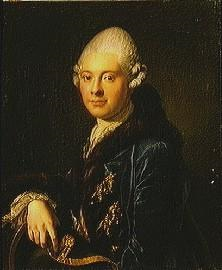
Michael Herman baron Lovenskiold

- 1370- ) Jacob Nielsen Ravensberg
- ( -1401) Mikkel Rud
- (1401–1429) Anna Pedersdatter Jernskæg, née Rud
- (1429- ) Vilhelm Rud
- ( -1504) Peder Rud
- (1504–1545) Hans Rud
- (1545–1559) Peder Rud
- (1559–1575) Grethe Bryske, née Rud
- (1575–1613) Anders Dresselbjerg
- (1613–1620) Vilhelm Dresselbjerg
- (1620–1653) Frederik Parsberg
- (1653–1662) Sophie Kaas, née Parsberg
- (1662–1672) Jørgen Parsberg
- (1672–1681) Helle Rosenkrantz, bée Trolle
- (1681–1686) Tage Thott
- (1686–1688) Christian Simonsen
- (1688–1721) Jens Hellegaard
- (1721–1740) Adam Levin Hellegaard
- (1740–1742) Charlotte West, bée Hellegaard
- (1742–1747) Søren West Lindberg
- (1747–1750) Jørgen Thomsen
- (1750–1776) Severin Leopoldus Løvenskiold
- (1776–1789) Magdalene Charlotte Hedevig Løvenskiold(née v. Numsen)
- (1789–1807) Michael Herman Løvenskiold
- (1807–1831) Carl Løvenskiold
- (1831–1877) Herman Løvenskiold
- (1877–1917) Herman Frederik Løvenskiold
- (1917–1938) Carl Løvenskiold
- (1921–1939) Simon Groth Teisen
- (1939–1962) Karen Groth Teisen
- (1962–1984) Christian Groth Teisen
- (1984 onwards) Hans Christian Eberhard Groth Teisen
