= Ingegjerd Løvenskiold Stuart =

Swedish-Norwegian courtier

Ingegjerd Ebba Dagmar Løvenskiold Stuart, née Andvord (born 27 September 1931) is a Swedish-Norwegian courtier; she holds the position of Mistress of the Robes to Queen Sonja.

== Early life ==
She is a daughter of diplomat Rolf Otto Andvord and Ingrid Anna Kristina Sten. Her parents divorced when she was five years old, following which she lived in Sweden with her Swedish mother and stepfather. She has one sister Anita who married Ulf Ander.

== Marriage and issue ==
While visiting her father in Paris, she met business magnate Harald Løvenskiold, member of Løvenskiold noble family whom she married in 1951. On her marriage, she became a daughter-in-law of Carl Otto Løvenskiold (1898–1969) and mother of Carl Otto Løvenskiold (born 1953).

== Later life ==
From 1952, Løvenskiold Stuart was involved with the modernisation of the buildings at Bærums Verk together with the Directorate for Cultural Heritage. The industry at Bærums Verk was eventually closed down, and the locality was transformed into a shopping mall Handelsstedet Bærums Verk which opened in 1985. The same year she was recruited by Sonja of Norway as mistress of the robes (Norwegian: overhoffmesterinne) in the royal court after Else Werring.

She has been active in the local branches of the Conservative Party, Norges Forsvarsforening and the Norwegian Women's Public Health Association. After her husband died in 1994, she married Robert Stuart in 1995. Stuart was the US ambassador to Norway from 1985 to 1989. The couple resided in Lake Forest, Illinois.

In 1989 she was decorated as a Commander of the Order of St. Olav. In 2009 a statue of her was erected at Bærums Verk.

== Honours ==
Country	Appointment	Ribbon
Norway	Commander of the Order of St. Olav	
Norway	Royal Family Order of Harald V, 2nd Class	
Netherlands	Knight Grand Cross of the Order of Orange-Nassau	
Luxembourg	Grand Cross of the Order of Adolphe of Nassau	

Court offices
Preceded by Else Werring	Overhoffmesterinne; 1985–	Succeeded by
