= Axel Løvenskiold =

Norwegian landowner and painter

Carl Axel Løvenskiold (13 January 1912 – 28 September 1980) was a Norwegian landowner and painter.

== Personal life ==
He was born in Ullern as a son of landowner Carl Løvenskiold (1874–1949) and Elise Bruun (1879–1950). He was a grandson of Lord Chamberlain Herman Severin Løvenskiold, great-grandson of Otto Joachim Løvenskiold, great-great-grandson of Severin Løvenskiold, grandnephew of Prime Minister Carl Otto Løvenskiold and a second cousin of Carl Otto Løvenskiold.

In 1940 he married Lucie Paus (born 1917 in Bygdøy, died 2006), daughter of Nicolay Nissen Paus (1885–1968; co-owner and CEO of Paus & Paus) and Else Margrethe Paus, née Paus (born 1885). Although distantly related, Nicolay Nissen Paus and Else Paus belonged to branches of the Paus family that parted in the 17th century. Else Paus, a daughter of businessman Ole Paus (1846–1931), belonged to the Skien branch, part of the Skien patriciate and related to Henrik Ibsen.

Axel and Lucie had two children, son Carl-Axel (1942-1991) and daughter Ingeborg Elise (1944-). Carl-Axel took over Ask Manor and married Anne Cathrine Mustad. Their children are Kristina Nathalia Løvenskiold (born 1974), Carl Axel Løvenskiold (born 1978), who owns Overud Manor, and Fredrik Clarin Løvenskiold (born 1978). Ingeborg Elise married Sven A. Solberg, a grandson of Peter Collett Solberg.

== Career ==
He finished Oslo Commerce School in 1930, then agricultural school in 1933 and agricultural education in Scotland from 1934 to 1935. He had his income as co-owner of Ullern Manor and owner of Ask Manor in Ask, Buskerud.

He chaired Buskerud Conservative Party from 1946 to 1952, was a board member of Libertas from 1956 to 1960 and was a supervisory council member of the conservative newspaper Morgenbladet since 1960. He was a board member of Follum Fabrikker from 1961 to 1971, Skogbruksforeningen av 1950 from 1962 to 1968, Forsikringsselskapet Skogbrand from 1967 (previously deputy chair of the supervisory council). He was an active painter who had his debut exhibit at the Autumn Exhibition in 1952. He issued the books Ullern Gårds historie in 1959, Landmannsliv in 1962, Thorvald Meyer in 1968. He also edited a book about the skiing club SK Fram, where he was also a member since 1961. He died in 1980.
