= Herman Krefting =

- Born: 25 September 1592; Bremen
- Died: 9 February 1651 (aged 58); Øvre Eiker, Norway
- Occupation: Ironworks pioneer

Herman Krefting (25 September 1592 – 9 February 1651) was a German born, Norwegian ironworks pioneer.

Krefting was born in Bremen; the son of Wolter Krefting and his wife Anna Winckel. He co-founded Det Norske Jernkompani in Copenhagen in 1618. From 1624 he was running several ironworks in Norway, including Bærums Verk and Eidsvoll Verk as well as Hakadals Verk at Hadeland and Fossum Verk at Gjerpen. He died in Øvre Eiker in 1651 and was buried at Haug Church.
