= Rolf Andvord (consul) =

Norwegian ship-owner

Rolf Thorsteinson Andvord
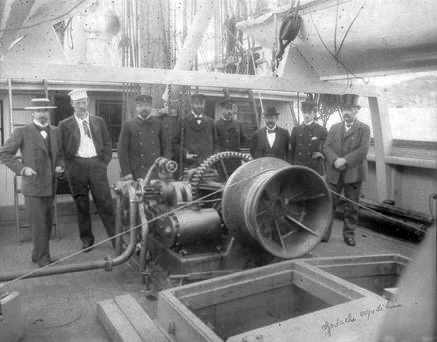
- R.T. Andvord (right) during the pre-purchase inspection of the Belgica
- Born: December 15, 1847; Lyngdal Municipality, Norway
- Died: October 26, 1906 (aged 58); Kristiana (Oslo), Norway
- Occupations: Ship-owner and consul
- Spouse: Antonette Smith-Petersen
- Children: Margrethe
- Parents: Thorstein Rolfsen Andvord; Sofie Barbara Margrethe Feyer

Rolf Thorsteinson Andvord (15 December 1847 – 26 October 1906) was a Norwegian ship-owner.

He was born in Lyngdal Municipality as a son of vicar Thorstein Rolfsen Andvord (1810–1870) and his wife Sofie Barbara Margrethe Feyer (1824–1869). He was a nephew of Johan Fredrik Feyer, a brother of physician Kristian Andvord, and uncle of ambassador Rolf Otto Andvord.

He married Antonette Smith-Petersen, a daughter of ship-owner Morten Smith-Petersen. Their daughter Margrethe married physician Edvard Heiberg Hansteen.

He grew up at his uncle's in Egersund, and went to school here. From the age of 14 he worked at sea, advancing to captain. He founded the shipping company Østlandske Lloyd in 1881, and ran the company until early 1906, when it was incorporated into the company Ganger Rolf. He was a driving force in converting to steam ships, bought the vessel SS Memento which became well known along the coast in his day. SS Memento sailed on Antwerp, and Andvord also broke the Wilson Line's monopoly on steamship traffic between Norway and Newcastle.

Andvord was consul for Belgium from 1894, and consul-general from 1905 to his death. He was a member of the Norwegian consulate committee in 1891, board member of Kristiania Port Authority and the Oslo East Station commission. Adrien de Gerlache named Andvord Bay (Graham Land, Antarctica) in recognition of his assistance in the purchase of the Belgica for the Belgian Antarctic Expedition.

He died in October 1906 in Kristiania.
