= Skylstad =

Skylstad is a surname. Notable people with the surname include:

- Magnus Skylstad (born 1983), Norwegian musician and record producer
- Rasmus Skylstad (1893–1972), Norwegian diplomat
- William S. Skylstad (born 1934), American Roman Catholic bishop
