= Det Norske Jernkompani =

Norwegian iron company

Det Norske Jernkompani also known as Jernkompaniet or Det store Jern Compagni, was a Norwegian iron company. It was established in 1618, as an initiative of Johan Post and Herman Krefting on the orders of King Christian IV. A royal privilege granted in 1624 meant that the company almost had a monopoly on iron production on an industrial scale within Norway. The company operated ironworks at Bærum, Eidsvoll, Fossum and Hakadal. After Johan Post died in 1631, Herman Krefting maintained an interest at the Eidsvoll and Bærums ironworks until his own death in 1651.

== See also ==
- Bærums Verk
- Eidsvoll Verk
