= Charles Robertson (Norwegian politician) =

Norwegian businessman and politician

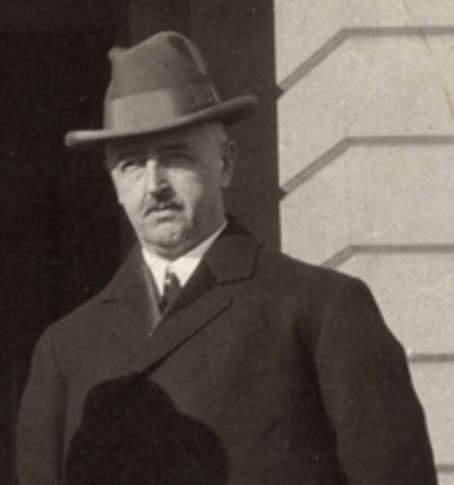

Minister of Trade
- In office 5 March 1926 – 28 January 1928
- Prime Minister: Ivar Lykke
- Preceded by: Lars Olai Meling
- Succeeded by: Anton Ludvig Alvestad

Mayor of Hammerfest
- In office 1 January 1924 – 31 December 1925
- Preceded by: Sigurd M. Eriksen
- Succeeded by: Sigurd M. Eriksen

Personal details
- Born: 23 August 1875 Fuglenes, Hammerfest, Sweden-Norway
- Died: 31 October 1958 (aged 83)
- Party: Conservative
- Spouse: Gudrun Brandt-Rantzau (m. 1899)
- Children: 4
- Parent(s): Nicolai George Robertson; Anna Albrethson

Charles Robertson (1875–1958) was the Norwegian Minister of Trade 1926–1928 and part of Lykke's Cabinet.

He was the son of merchant Nicolai George Robertson and his wife Anna Albrethson. His father's family came from Scotland to Hammerfest with his grandfather Charles Robertson the Elder in 1827. The family business G. Robertson traded in salted fish, stockfish, shark fishing and seal hunting. They had a number of branches and fishing villages along the Finnmark coast.

On 24 May 1899 he married his cousin Gudrun Brandt-Rantzau, daughter of district physician Johannes Brandt-Rantzau and Nicoline Cecilie Mathea Robertson. His sister Anna Robertson married Attorney General and later Minister of State Andreas Urbye. His niece Gudrun Martius, married the diplomat Johan Georg Alexius Ræder.

Charles Robertson had four children: George Robertson (born 1900), Dorohea Robertson (born 1904), Ole Robertson (born 1905) and Charles Robertson (born 1911).

Charlesbreen, a glacier in Svalbard is named after him.

== Ancestors ==
On his father's side Charles is a descendant of many Scottish clan chiefs, lairds, earls, (and other Scottish nobility) such as Sir John Maclean, 4th Baronet of Duart and Morvern, Colin Cam Mackenzie, 11th Laird of Kintail and William Graham, 3rd Earl of Menteith. James II of Scotland is Charles' 13×-great-grandfather. On his mother's side he is a descendant of Jens Holmboe and a part of the Holmboe family.
