= Vækerø Manor =

Manor house in Oslo, Norway

Coordinates: 59°54′58″N 10°39′24″E

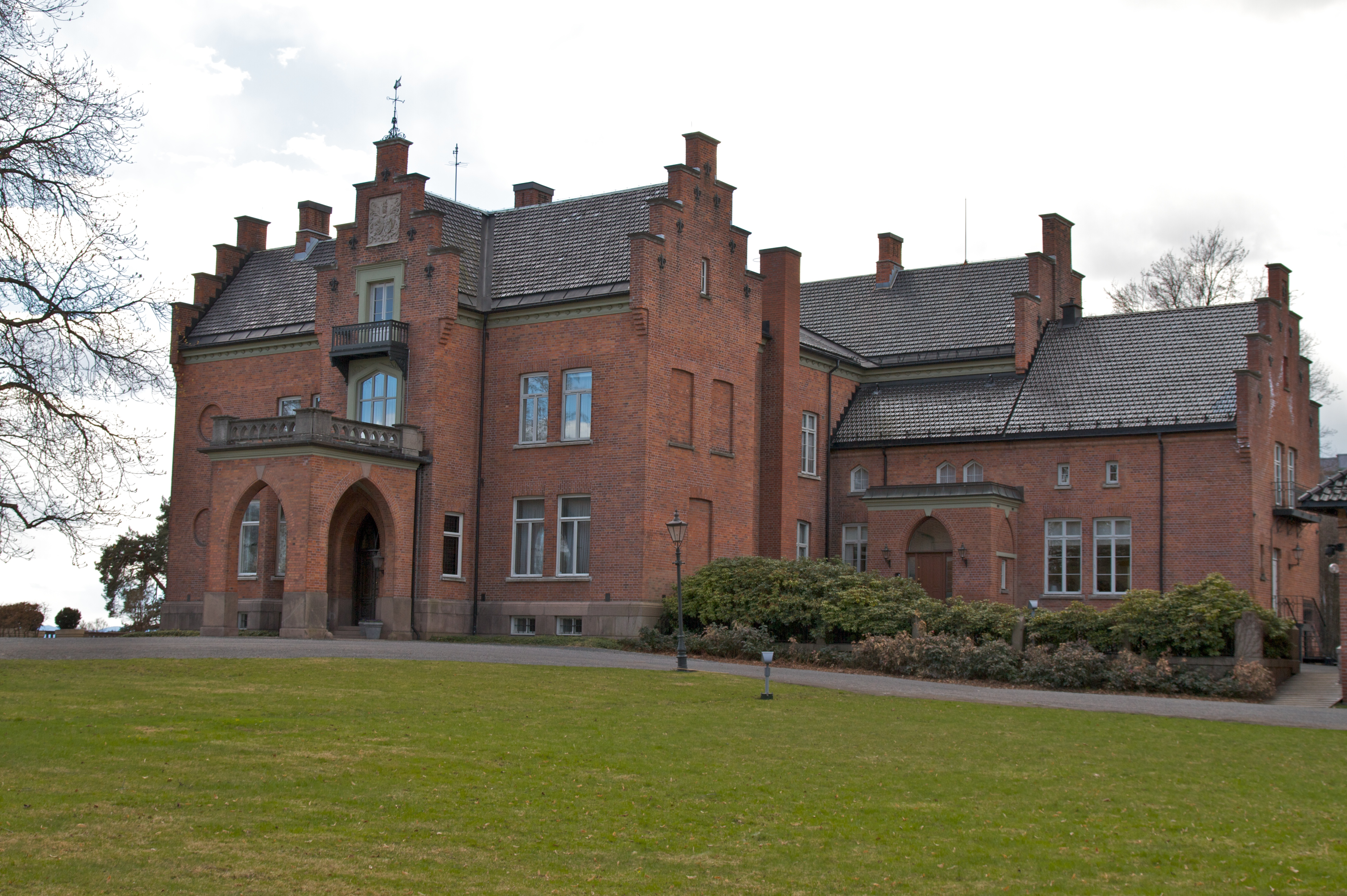
Vækerø Manor

Vækerø Manor (Norwegian: Vækerø gård) is a historic manor house situated in Oslo, Norway.

Vækerø Manor is located in the neighborhood of Vækerø in the district of Ullern on Oslo's west side. The house manor was formerly a part of a larger estate related to the owners of the Bærums Verk ironworks in the nearby community of Bærum. Historically, the manor belonged to members of the Løvenskiold family. Much of the property was later sold to the aluminium company, Norsk Hydro.

The manor house is a large brick building designed during 1880 after drawings by architect, Heinrich Ernst Schirmer. Vækerø Manor was constructed in 1881 for prominent politician and landowner, Carl Otto Løvenskiold, who maintained it as a residence.
