= Fossum, Telemark =

Fossum
- Interactive map of Fossum
- Coordinates: 59°14′36″N 9°33′43″E
- County: Telemark
- Time zone: UTC+01:00 (CET)

Fossum is a neighborhood in Skien, Telemark, Norway.

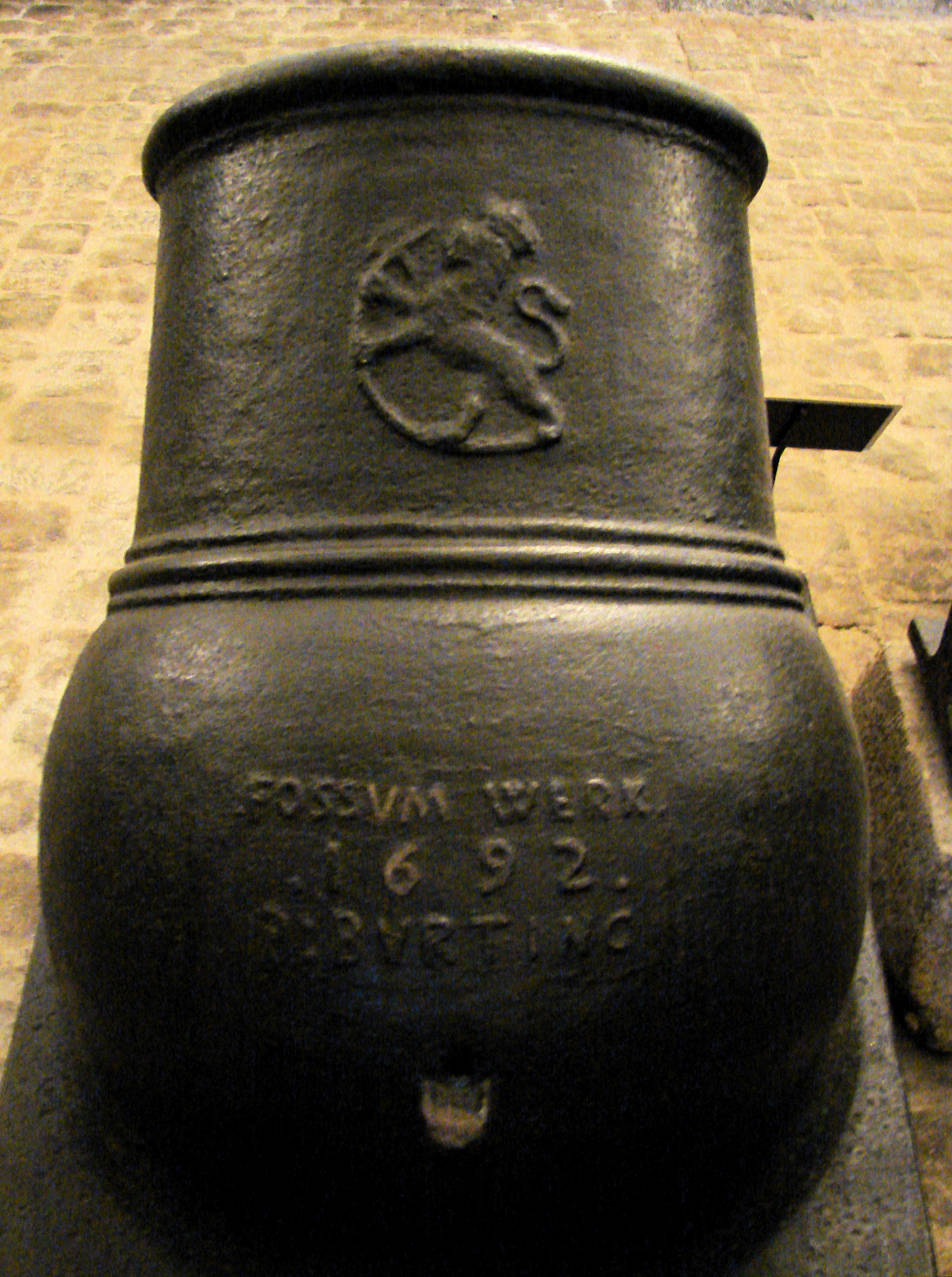
Mortar cast by Fossum Ironworks. Text reads: Fossum Werk 1692

Historically the neighborhood was associated with Fossum Ironworks (Fossum Jernverk), the iron mines which dated from the 16th century and with Fossum Works (Fossum Verk), the ironworks. Fossum Ironworks, which was one of the oldest ironworks in Norway, closed down in 1867.

Fossum Manor (Fossum hovedgård) is a manor house located north of Skien which has given its name to the neighborhood. The manor house was built as a residence for Severin Løvenskiold. Construction was started in 1804. It was designed by Danish architect Christian Frederik Hansen and was completed in 1818. The manor been owned by the Løvenskiold family for centuries and prominent family members have been born here.

The local sports team is Fossum IF, which is often called "Fossum (Skien)" to distinguish from the more prominent club Fossum IF in Bærum.
