= Peter Nicolay Ræder =

Norwegian diplomat

Peter Nicolay Ræder (born 20 August 1943) is a Norwegian diplomat.

He was a son of the diplomat Johan Georg Alexius Ræder and Gudrun Dorothea Ræder. He took the cand.jur. degree and was hired by the Norwegian Ministry of Foreign Affairs in 1973. He was the Norwegian ambassador to Argentina from 1994 to 1999, and an adviser in the Ministry of Foreign Affairs from 1999 to 2002, the ambassador to Saudi Arabia from 2002 to 2004 and to the Czech Republic from 2004. In 1998, he was decorated as a Knight, First Class of the Order of St. Olav.
