= Anna Krefting =

Norwegian businesswoman (1683–1766)

Anna Paulsdatter Krefting
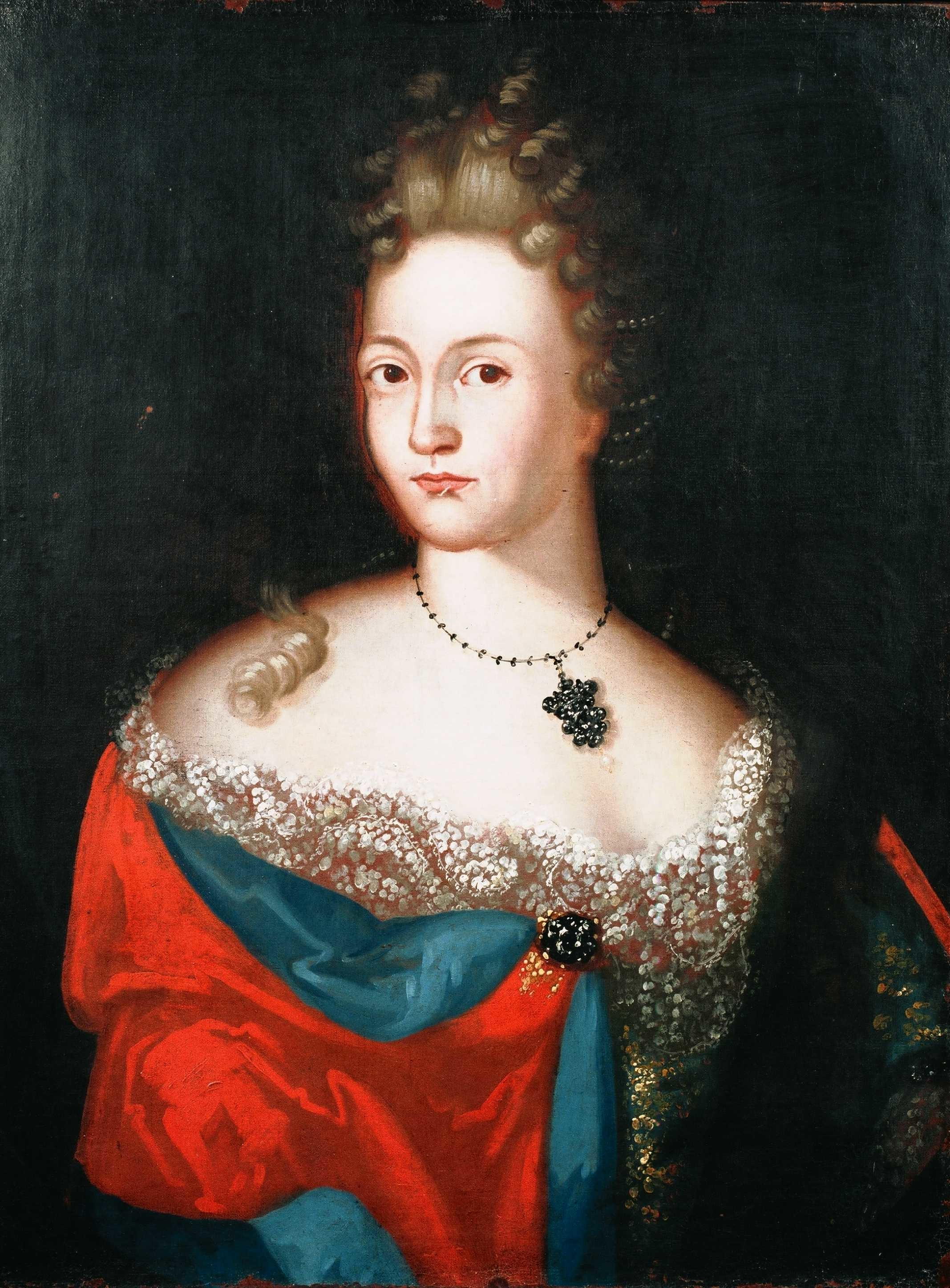
- Born: Anna Paulsdatter Vogt; 23 March 1683; Christiania
- Died: 25 March 1766 (aged 83); Bærum
- Resting place: 59.8957°N 10.47940°E
- Occupation: Owner/proprietor
- Years active: 1712 - 1766
- Known for: Businesswoman for pre-industrial enterprises in Norway
- Spouse: Herman Krefting
- Parent(s): Paul Pedersen Vogt (1646–1708) and Catarina Brauman (1658–1742)

Anna Paulsdatter Krefting née Vogt (1683-1766), was a Norwegian businesswoman who ran and expanded her family's business enterprises in and around Christiania for over 50 years. Among these enterprises were mines and ironworks, forestry, and trade.

Anna Paulsdatter Vogt was born into an affluent family in Christiania with ties to the government in Copenhagen. Her father, Paul Pedersen Vogt, was originally from Denmark and was responsible for the stores at Akershus Fortress but also a merchant, mill owner, and shipowner in Christiania. Anna's mother, Catarina née Bauman, was the daughter of Dominicus Brau(n)man, war commissary and also in charge of the stores at Akershus.

Anna married Herman Krefting on 26 October 1699, when she was only 16 years old. The couple had at least seven children together. Anna was widowed while she was pregnant with the last child. She never remarried but took over the business and real estate interests of her husband and managed them for 54 years. In particular, the ironworks at Bærums Verk grew to be the largest of its kind in Norway during her time. But she was also responsible for purchase and sale of land, other ironworks, and mines.

She also established a school for the children of her employees and contributed heavily to Tanum Church. She was in continuous litigation with count Ferdinand Anton Danneskiold-Laurvig over rights to mine iron ore on her property on the island of Langøy outside of Kragerø. In 1719 she and her son-in-law Andreas Walleur were granted exclusive rights by the crown to run the iron works at Dikemark. When Walleur died, Krefting let her widowed daughter Anna Katarina run the works. In 1762, the main building burned down at Bærums Verk, but Krefting managed its reconstruction. Since none of Krefting's descendants were interested in taking over her work, the property and holdings were sold on auction upon her death in 1766.

Krefting's holdings were visited by two kings, Frederik IV in 1704, and Christian VI in 1733.

Krefting also resisted the invasion by Charles XII of Sweden during the Great Northern War in 1716 by notifying Norwegian forces of the Swedish troops' dispositions.
