= Rolf Andvord =

Norwegian jurist and diplomat

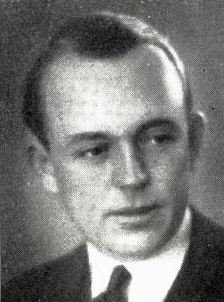
RolfOttoAndvord

Rolf Otto Andvord (31 October 1890 – 8 March 1976) was a Norwegian jurist and diplomat.

== Biography ==
He was born in Sør-Aurdal Municipality, Norway, as a son of Kristian Andvord (1855–1934), a chief physician, and Ebba Blomstedt (1860–1953). He was a nephew of ship-owner Rolf Andvord. He was married to the banker's daughter Ingrid Anna Kristina Sten from 1930 to 1936. His daughter Ingegjerd married the business magnate Harald Løvenskiold. His second daughter Anita married Ulf Ander.

Upon finishing his secondary education in 1909, he enrolled in law studies in 1910 and graduated with a cand.jur. degree in 1915. He thereupon started working for the Norwegian Ministry of Foreign Affairs. In 1921 he became chargé d'affaires at the Norwegian legation in Copenhagen, and soon after secretary at the Norwegian legation in Paris, and he was also assisting secretary in the Ministry of Foreign Affairs and worked at the Norwegian legation in London. From 1935 he served as ambassador to Argentina, with additional accreditation to Bolivia, Chile, Paraguay, Peru and Uruguay. He also served as a consul-general in Buenos Aires. Before the war he also took part in several League of Nations meetings.

In 1941 he was sent to the Soviet Union, with a side mission in Iran. In 1942 he was given the rank of ambassador to the Soviet Union. From 1946 to 1948 he was the permanent under-secretary of state (utenriksråd) in the Ministry of Foreign Affairs, from 1948 to 1958 he was the Norwegian ambassador to France and from 1958 to 1961 in Spain.

He was decorated with the Grand Cross of the Royal Norwegian Order of St. Olav in 1946. He also received the Grand Crosses of the Order of the Dannebrog, the French Légion d'honneur, the Spanish Order of Isabella the Catholic, the Peruvian Order of the Sun, the Order of Homayoun and the Order of Merit of Chile. He was a Commander of the Portuguese Order of Christ, the Order of St Alexander and the Order of Polonia Restituta, and a Grand Knight of the Order of the Falcon. He also received the Haakon VII Anniversary Medal in 1955 as well as the King George V Silver Jubilee Medal and the King Christian X's Liberty Medal. In 1964 he published his memoirs. He died in March 1976 in Málaga.

== War Effort ==
During his stay in Moscow, in service as Ambassador, he became a spy for the KGB, and conveyed information about the western allie's operations.

As a spy, according to author Alf R. Jacobsen, he would have contributed little additional beyond what KGB knew from other sources. The same writer points argued that Andvord praised Soviet society, and did, not even in retrospect, reflect on the extent of suffering and terror endured by the Russian and Ukrainian peoples under Stalin and his regime, which he served in secrecy. He mentioned in his memoirs how the authorities managed to convey to him a large shipment of Bordeaux wine, via Argentina and Siberia, in a heated wagon so as not to damage it. His most valuable contribution to Soviet intelligence would have been in the post-war years, when he served as under-secretary in the ministry of foreign affairs.

Diplomatic posts
Preceded by	Norway's ambassador to the Soviet Union; 1942–1946	Succeeded by Hans Christian Berg
Preceded by Ludvig Aubert	Norway's ambassador to France; 1948–1958	Succeeded by Rasmus Skylstad
Preceded by Johan Georg Alexius Ræder	Norway's ambassador to Spain; 1958–1961	Succeeded by Henrik Andreas Broch
Civic offices
Preceded by Per Preben Prebensen	Permanent under-secretary of state in the Ministry of Foreign Affairs; 1946–1948	Succeeded by Rasmus Skylstad
