= Michael Herman Løvenskiold =

Danish landowner, county governor and chamberlain

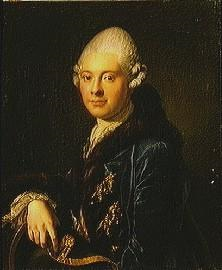
Michael Herman Lovenskiold painted by Jens Juel in 1772

Michael Herman Løvenskiold (15 October 1751 – 19 April 1807) was a Danish landowner, county governor (amtmand) and chamberlain. He owned Løvenborg and Vognserup at Holbæk.

== Early life and education ==
Løvenskiold was born on 15 November 1751 at Aggersvold, the son of the Norwegian baron Severin Leopoldus Løvenskiold (1719–76) and Magdalene Charlotte Hedevig Løvenskiold (née Numsen, 1731–96). He earned a law degree from the University of Copenhagen in 1772. He later worked as an assistant (auskultant) in Rentekammeret.

== Career ==
In 1781, Løvensjiold was appointed county governor (amtmand) of Holbæk County. In 1783, he was also appointed county governor of Kalundborg, Sæbygård and Dragsholm counties. He was also responsible for overseeing the royal holdings in Odsherred.

In 1774, he was created chamberlain (kammerherre). In 1803, he was created a White Knight.

== Landowner ==
After the father's death in 1776, Løvenskiold's mother charged him with managing Vognserup. In 1776–80, he kept a detailed journal of the operations. In 1678, Løvenskiold's mother transferred ownership of Vogneserup and Løvenborg to him.

Both as a landholder and as county governor, he took a profound interest in the living conditions of the tenant farmers. He improved their living conditions, implemented reforms and constructed schools for their children. He also adopted a critical approach to the ruthless way many of his peer's treated the peasants on their land. In 1795, he was made a member of the hoveri (mandatory work) commission of Zealand-Funen. From 2 October 1795 to 8 November 1797, he kept a detailed diary of the work in the commission. In one case, he mentions how it takes "the patience of an angel" not to beat up a fellow landholder for his brutal treatment of the peasants.

== Personal life ==
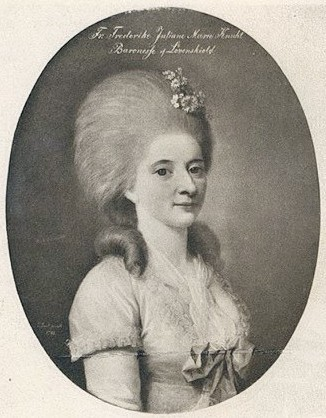
Frederikke Juliane Knuth.

On 18 May 1774, he married Frederikke Juliane Marie Knuth (1755-1804). She was a daughter of count Eggert Christopher Knuth til Knuthenborg (1722–76) and Maria von Numsen (1734–65).

He died on 19 April 1807 and is buried at Nørre Jernløse graveyard.

Civic offices
Preceded by Bartholomæus de Cederfeld	[ Kalundborg County; 1783–1793	Succeeded by None
Preceded by Bartholomæus de Cederfeld	County governor of Holbæk; 1781–1804	Succeeded by Frederik Adeler
Preceded by Bartholomæus de Cederfeld	County governor of Dragsholm; 1783–1803	Succeeded by None
Preceded by Bartholomæus de Cederfeld	County governor of Sæbygaard; 1783–1803	Succeeded by None
