= Severin Leopoldus Løvenskiold =

Norwegian timber merchant

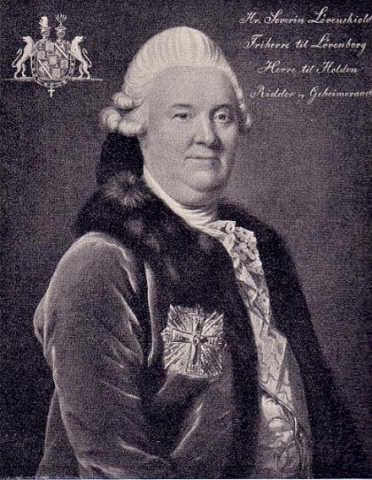
Severin (Søren) Leopoldus Løvenskiold.

Severin (Søren) Leopoldus Løvenskiold (31 December 1719 - 9 April 1776) was a Norwegian-Danish timber merchant and landowner. In 1763, he was created a baron of Løvenborg (with Vognserup). He and his wife Magdalene Charlotte Hedevig Løvenskiold belonged to the circle around Andreas Peter Bernstorff. They were the parents of Michael Herman Løvenskiold.

== Early life and education ==
Løvenskiold was born 31 December 1719 Bjørntved, Norway. He was the son of konferensråd Herman Leopoldus (1677-1750) and Kirsten Sørensdatter Brinck (død 1736). The father's first wife was Inger Halvorsdatter Borse (1677-1714). His father had made a fortune in the timber and iron industry. In the late 1730s, he moved to Denmark where he bought the estates Aggersvold (1837) and Birkholm (1838). Løvenskiold's elder half brother Herman Leopoldus Jr. remained in Norway. Løvenskiold's father and his two sons were ennobled by letters patent in 1739.

Løvenskiold served in the Royal Life Guard on Foot from in 1738 to 1745 with rank of lieutenant reformé.

== Holdings ==
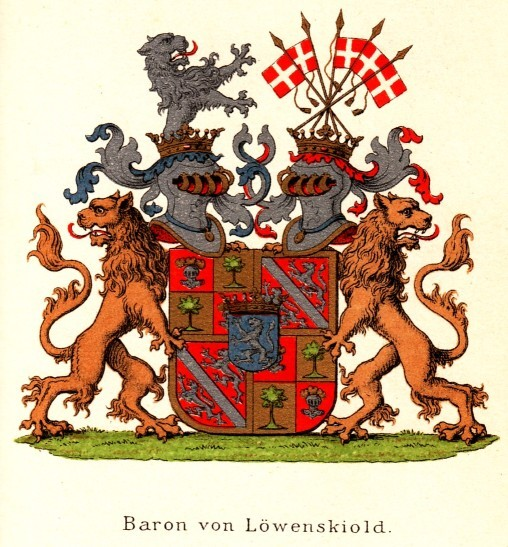
Løvensjiold's coat of arms.

On his father's death in 1750, Løvenskiold inherited the estates Aggersvold and Birkholm in Denmark as well as Holden iron works in Norway. By Frederik V he was around the same time presented with one of the four Amalienborg lots in the Frederiksstaden in Copenhagen. The gift came with an obligation to construct a mansion to Niels Eigtved's design on the site within a certain amount of time.Løvenskiold sold Ulefos to finance the ambitious construct project but ended up selling the property to countess A. S. Schack. In 1776, he sold Aggersvold and bought Vognserup. Borkholm and Vognserup were subsequently converted into a so-called stamus under the name Løvenborg. In 1773, it was converted into a barony.

Løvenskiol took very active part in the management of his estates. He introduced a number of reforms in their management.

== Personal life ==
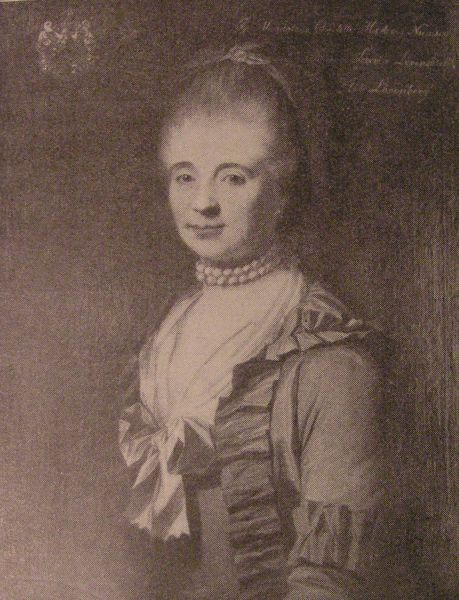
Magdalene Charlotte Hedevig von Numsen.

On 9 May 1749, Løvensjiold married Magdalene Charlotte Hedevig Numsen (1731-1796). She was a daughter of gehejmeråd Michael Numsen (1686-1757) and Margrethe Marie Thomasine Numsen (née Ingenhaef, 1705–76). They were the parents of Michael Herman Løvenskiold.

Severin Leopoldus Løvenskiold and Magdalene Charlotte Hedevig Løvenskiold belonged to the circle around Foreign Minister Andreas Peter Bernstorff and his wife Henriette Frederikke Stolberg. From 1771, Inger Schubart, a relative of Severin Løvenskiold, lived at Løvenborg with her daughters Charlotte and Sybilla, who later married Heinrich Ernst Schimmelmann and Ludvig Reventlow respectively. The poets Johannes Ewald and Jens Baggesen were also among the guests of their home, as was the theologian N. E. Balle and the educator H.V. Richter. Cabinet Secretary Ove Høegh-Guldberg was also among the guests at Løvenborg, but when it became known in 1780 that he was responsible for Bernstorff's removal, Løvenskiold broke all ties with him. The secret negotiations that that would later lead to the change of government in 1784 and the fall of Høegh-Guldberg took place at Løvenborg.

In 1759, Løvenskiold was created a White Knight. He died on 9 April 1776. He is buried at Nørre Jernløse.
