= Rolf Andersen (diplomat) =

Norwegian diplomat

The meeting of the Oslo convention, with Rolf Andersen

Rolf Andersen (25 July 1897 – 25 July 1980) was a Norwegian diplomat.

He was a deputy under-secretary of state in the Norwegian Ministry of Foreign Affairs, and participated in the Norwegian delegation to the Paris Peace Conference, 1946. He was later a Norwegian envoy to Switzerland, the Norwegian ambassador to Italy to 1958, to Denmark from 1958 to 1963, and in France from 1963 to 1967.

He was the father of Rolf Trolle Andersen, who became ambassador to France too.

Diplomatic posts
Preceded by Rasmus Skylstad	Norwegian ambassador to France; 1963–1967	Succeeded by Hersleb Vogt
