= Gudrun Dorothea Ræder =

Norwegian diplomat (1908–1998)

- Born: Gudrun Dorothea Martius; 21 April 1908; Göttingen, Germany
- Died: 26 September 1998 (aged 90); Bærum, Norway
- Occupation: Diplomat
- Spouse: Johan Georg A. Ræder (m. 1940)
- Children: Peter Nicolay Ræder
- Relatives: Charles Robertson (uncle)

Gudrun Dorothea Ræder (née Martius; 21 April 1908 – 26 September 1998) was a Norwegian diplomat. She was the first female Norwegian diplomat, serving at the legation in London.

== Personal life ==
Ræder was born in Göttingen on 21 April 1908, a daughter of Rudolf Ancus Martius and Dorothea Robertson. In 1940 she married Johan Georg A. Ræder. They were the parents of Peter Nicolay Ræder (born 1943).

She died in Bærum in 1998.

== Career ==
Ræder was appointed at the Ministry of Foreign Affairs in 1938, and served as secretary in London from 1938 to 1939, thus becoming the first female Norwegian diplomat. From November 1939 to March 1940 she took part in negotiations on trade agreements between Norway and Germany, and between Norway and Great Britain, as secretary for both the Norwegian delegations.

In April 1940, after the German invasion of Norway, Gudrun Martius made her way to Stockholm, where she worked a period for the Norwegian embassy. She eventually moved to London, where both her sister and her future husband Johan Georg Ræder were stationed at the embassy. Travelling by plane to Helsinki, and further with ship from Petsamo via Iceland to Scotland, she arrived in London on 7/8 August 1940. Following ongoing conflicts around Halvdan Koht, the Minister of Foreign Affairs in the Norwegian government-in-exile, Martius replaced Unni Diesen as secretary for Koht from end of August, until Koht's resignation in November 1940. Having married Ræder in 1940, she continued working for the Ministry, and from 1941 to 1943 she was personal secretary for the new Minister of Foreign Affairs, Trygve Lie.

She issued the memoir book De uunnværlige flinke in 1975. The book became noted for reporting about warning messages received at the Norwegian Ministry of Foreign Affairs ahead of the German invasion of Norway in 1940.

== Selected works ==
- De uunnværlige flinke. Oslo: Gyldendal. 1975. ISBN 9788205082847. OCLC 3754821.
