= Løvenborg, Holbæk Municipality =

Danish historic manor house

Løvenborg
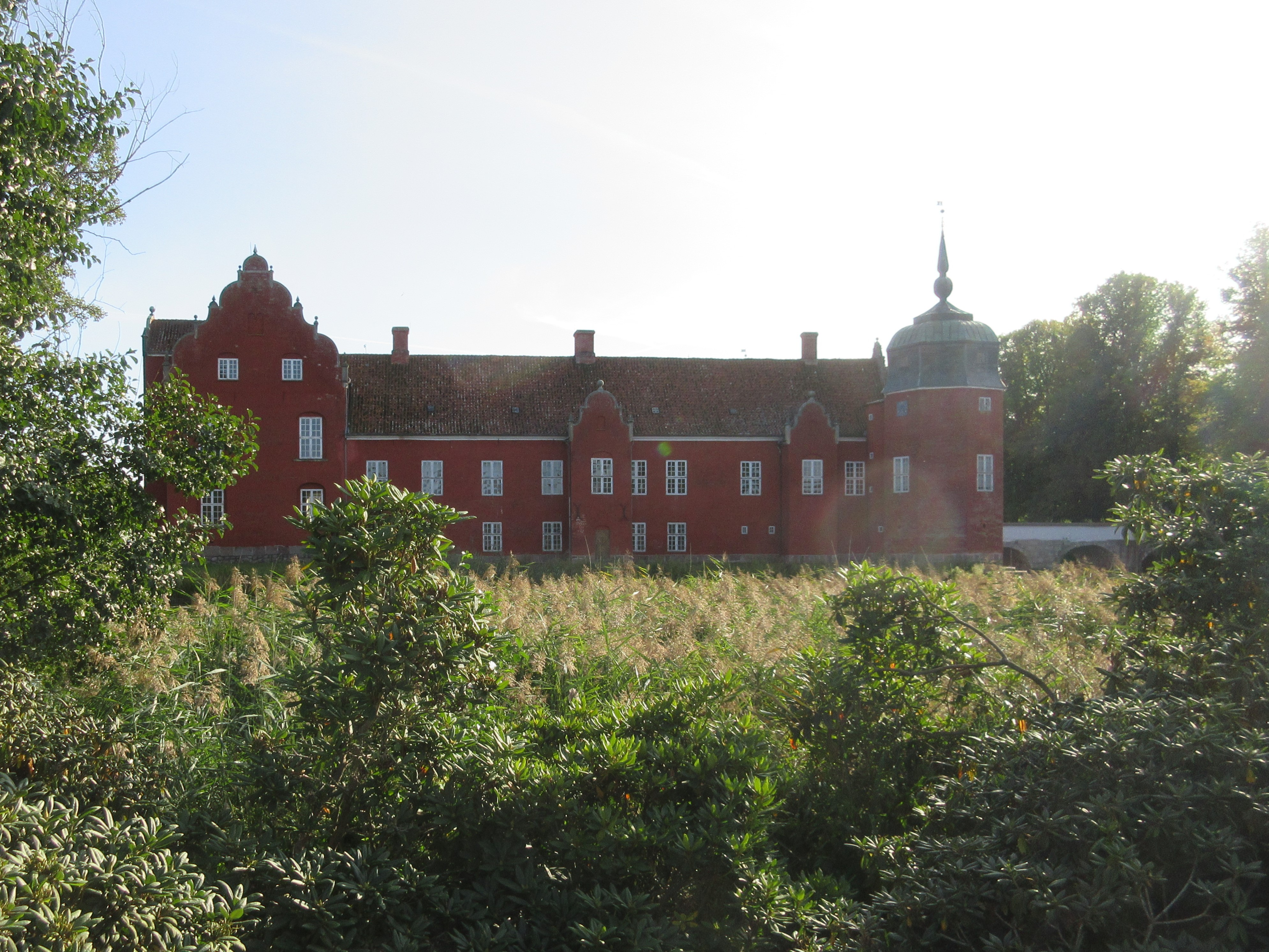

General information
- Location: Løvenborg Allé 30; 4420 Regstrup, Denmark
- Coordinates: 55°40′58″N 11°35′19″E
- Completed: 1630s

Løvenborg is a manor house and estate at Holbæk, Denmark.

== History ==
=== Ellinge ===
In the late 12th century, Bishop Absalon owned a village named Ennlige at the site. In 1199, he presented it to Sorø Abbey. In 1330, Sorø Abbey passed it to Roskilde bishopric. It is not known when the village was replaced by a many of the same name. It served as the seat of a relatively large fief. During the Reformation, it was confiscated by the Crown along with all other property of the Catholic church. It was then managed as a royal fief.

=== Birkholm ===
In 1547, Ellinge was sold to the Pomeranian nobleman Hans Barnekow- At the same tome, he was naturalized as Danish nobility. As part of the arrangement, he was obliged to settle in Denmark and take a Danish wife. In 1550, he married Mette Oxe. Barnekow changed the name of the estate to Birkholm. Merete Oxe stayed on the estate after ger husband's death. In 1582, it was ceded to their son Johan Barnekow.

After Johan Barnekow's death in 1603, Birkholm was passed to his brother Christian Barnekow. Christian Barnekow died in 1612. His widow Margrethe Brahe Barnekow (1584-1617) managed the estate until their son Ove Barnekow was old enough to take over the operation. Upon his death in 1629. Birkholm passed to his brother Hans Barnekow. He sold it in 1630.

The new owner was Malte Juul, the owner of Jessinggaard and Maltesholm. After a career at the Royal Court in Copenhagen, he had more recently served as feudal lord of Christianopel (Oslo), Norway. His widow Anne Juul née Ramel stayed on the estate after his death. She outlived their only son and the estate was therefore passed to their youngest daughter, Margrethe's husband, Mouritz Podebusk. In 1676, he established the Barony of Einsiedelsborg. Birkholm was not included in the barony. The estate was instead sold to Frederik Vittinghof Scheel. In 1680, he established the Barony of Scheelenborg. After his death the estate was endowed to his son-in-law. baron Schack von Brockdorff. After his death in 1731, it was sold at auction. The buyer was his wife, Sophie Charlotte, who ceded it to their son, Frederik von Brockdorff. He pawned the estate in 1735. In 1738, it was sold at auction.

=== Løvenskiold family ===
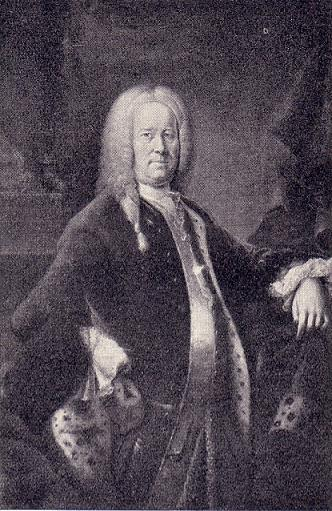
Herman Leopoldus Loevenskiold

The buyer was Herman Leopoldus, a timber merchant and shipowner from Skien-Porsgrund in Norway. He had already purchased Aggersvold at Hjembæk, in 1737. In 1738, he was ennobled under the name Løvenskiold. He died in 1750. Severin Løvenskiold (1777–1856) a son by his second wife, inherited Birkholm and Aggersvold as well as several iron works in Norway. Severin Løvenskiold had served in the Royal Life Guards and was just 24 years old appointed to konferensråd. In 1749 he married Magdalene Charlotte Hedevig Løvenskiold (née von Numsen), a daughter of the General War Commissioner. Severin Løvenskiold established a stamhus under the name Løvenborg from Birkholm and Vognserup in 1766. The stamhus was turned into a barony in 1773.

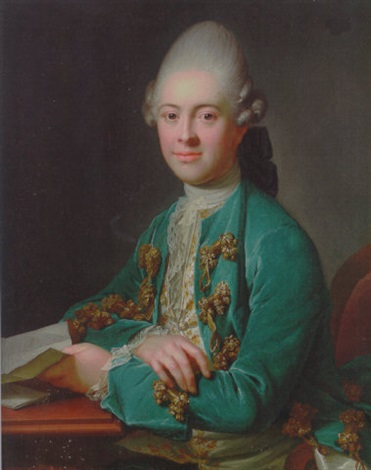
Michael Herman Lovenskiold painted by Jens Juel in 1772

Severin Løvenskiold's widow, Magdalene Charlotte Hedevig Løvenskiold, owned the Løvenborg estate after her husband's death in 1776. The estate was supposedly used for secret negotiations by foreign minister A.P. Bernstorff in conjunction with crown prince Frederick's (Frederik VI) seizure of power. In 1789, Magdalene Charlotte Hedevig Løvenskiold ceded Løvenborg to her only son, Michael Herman Løvenskiold. He implemented the agricultural reforms of the time on the estate by selling the tenant farms to the copyholders. This process was completed in 1802.

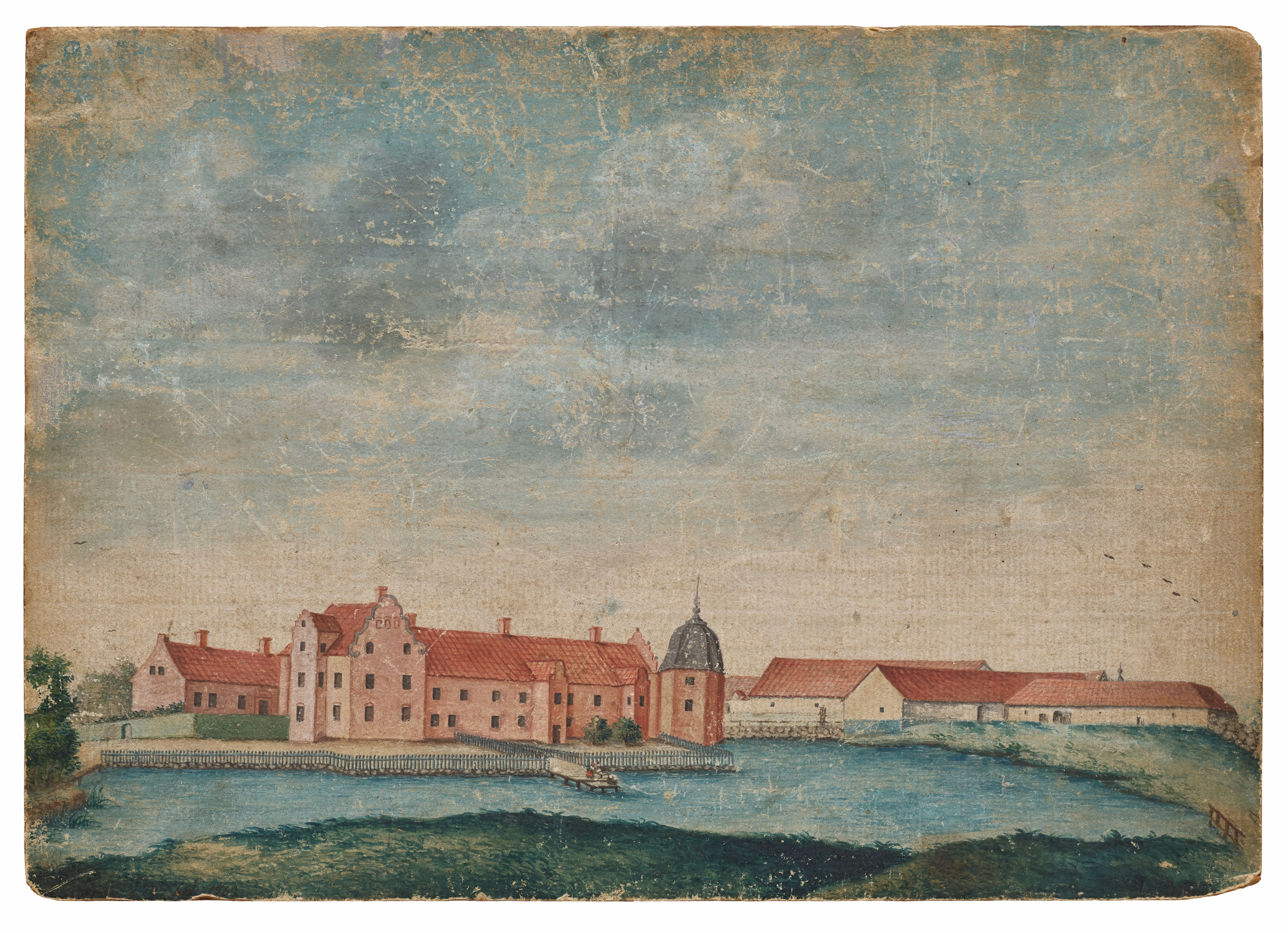
Løvenborg in 1871

Carl Michael Herman Løvenskiold's eldest son, Carl Løvenskiold, inherited the barony in 1807. His son, Herman Løvenskiold, inherited the estate in 1821. He led a quiet life on the estate. He was very interested in music and several of his compositions were published under the pseudonym Fridolin Carlsen. After his death in 1877, Løvenborg was passed on to his son Herman Frederik Løvenskiold. The estate was the following year placed under administration by a legal guardian since Løvenskiold was deemed mentally ill. He objected several times but in vain and ended up moving to Vejle where he made a living as a plumber.

=== Ahlefeldt-Laurvig ===
After his death in 1917, Løvenborg was passed on to his nephew Carl Løvenskiold. The barony was dissolved in 1921 as a result of the lensafkøsningsloven of 1919. Part of the land was sold off in lots to be able to pay the fee to the state and Vognserup was sold in 1921. After Carl Løvenskiold's death in 1938, Løvenborg was sold to count Christian Carl Ahlefeldt-Laurvig.

== Cultural references ==
Løvenborg has been used as a location in the films Komtessen paa Steenholt (1939), Jeppe på bjerget (1981) and Jydekompagniet (1988). It was also used as a location in the DT television series Gøngehøvdingen (1992).

== List of owners ==
- ( -1536) Bishopric of Roskilde
- (1536-1547) The Crown
- (1547-1559) Hans Barnekow
- (1559-1582) Mette Oxe, gift Barnekow
- (1582-1603) Johan Barnekow
- (1603-1612) Christian Barnekow
- (1612-1617) Margrethe Brahe, gift Barnekow
- (1617-1629) Ove Barnekow
- (1629-1630) Hans Barnekow
- (1630-1648) Malte Juul
- (1648-1661) Anne Ramel, gift Juul
- (1661-1684) Mouritz Podebusk
- (1684-1691) Frederik Vittinghof Scheel
- (1691-1731) Schack von Brockdorff
- (1731-1732) Sophie Charlotte Vittinghof, gift von Brockdorff
- (1732-1735) Frederik von Brockdorff
- (1735- ) Frederik von Mösting
- ( -1738) Arvinger efter Frederik von Mösting
- (1738-1750) Herman Leopoldus Løvenskiold
- (1750-1776) Severin Leopoldus Løvenskiold
- (1776-1789) Magdalene Charlotte Hedevig Løvenskiold (mée Numsen)
- (1789-1807) Michael Herman Løvenskiold
- (1807-1831) Carl Løvenskiold
- (1831-1877) Herman Løvenskiold
- (1877-1917) Herman Frederik Løvenskiold
- (1917-1938) Carl Løvenskiold
- (1938- ) Christian Carl Ahlefeldt-Laurvig
- (1989- ) Christian Knud Ahlefeldt-Laurvig
