= Kristian Andvord =

Norwegian physician and medical researcher

Kristian Feyer Andvord (17 May 1855 – 19 May 1934) was a Norwegian physician and medical researcher. He was a pioneer in the study and treatment of tuberculosis.

He was born at Lyngdal Municipality in Lister og Mandal county as a son of parish priest Thorstein Rolfsen Andvord and Sofie Barbara Margrethe Feyer. He was the father of jurist and diplomat Rolf Andvord. He graduated with a degree in medicine in 1882. From 1887 to 1896, he was associated with the Tonsåsen Sanatorium (now Tonsåsen Rehabilitation Centre) at Valdres in Oppland. Andvord conducted a study of the treatment of tuberculosis while at Tonsåsen and published a number of studies starting in 1889. He later moved to Kristiania (now Oslo) and returned to general practition and to work at the Gausdal Sanatorium.

He was decorated Knight, First Class of the Order of St. Olav in 1925, and Knight of the Swedish Order of the Polar Star.
