= Johan Georg A. Ræder =

Norwegian diplomat (1905–1981)

Johan Georg Alexius Ræder (23 April 1905 – 23 May 1981) was a Norwegian diplomat.

He was born in Kristiania as a son of Major Nicolay Caspary Ræder (1870–1921) and Johanne Elisabeth Nicolaysen (1875–1940). In 1940 he married Gudrun Dorothea Martius. He was the father of diplomat Peter Nicolay Ræder, and great-great-grandson of Johan Christopher Ræder.

He enrolled as a student in 1923, and graduated with the cand.jur. degree in 1927. After being a deputy judge from 1927 to 1928 he was hired in the Norwegian Ministry of Foreign Affairs. He served as an attaché in Paris from 1929 to 1931, as a secretary at the general consulate in London in 1932. He worked in Norway from 1933 to 1940 and again in London from 1940 to 1945, during the war. He was a deputy under-secretary of state in the Ministry of Foreign Affairs from 1945 to 1948 and 1951 to 1953, and the permanent under-secretary of state (the highest-ranking civil position) from 1958 to 1965. He served as the Norwegian ambassador to Belgium (and Luxembourg) from 1948 to 1951, to Francoist Spain from 1953 to 1957 and to Italy (and Greece and Malta) from 1965 to 1973.

Diplomatic posts
Preceded by position created	Norway's ambassador to Spain; 1953–1957	Succeeded by Rolf Andvord
Civic offices
Preceded by Rasmus Skylstad	Permanent under-secretary of state in the Norwegian Ministry of Foreign Affairs; 1958–1965	Succeeded by Thore Boye
