= Rasmus Skylstad =

Norwegian diplomat (1893–1972)

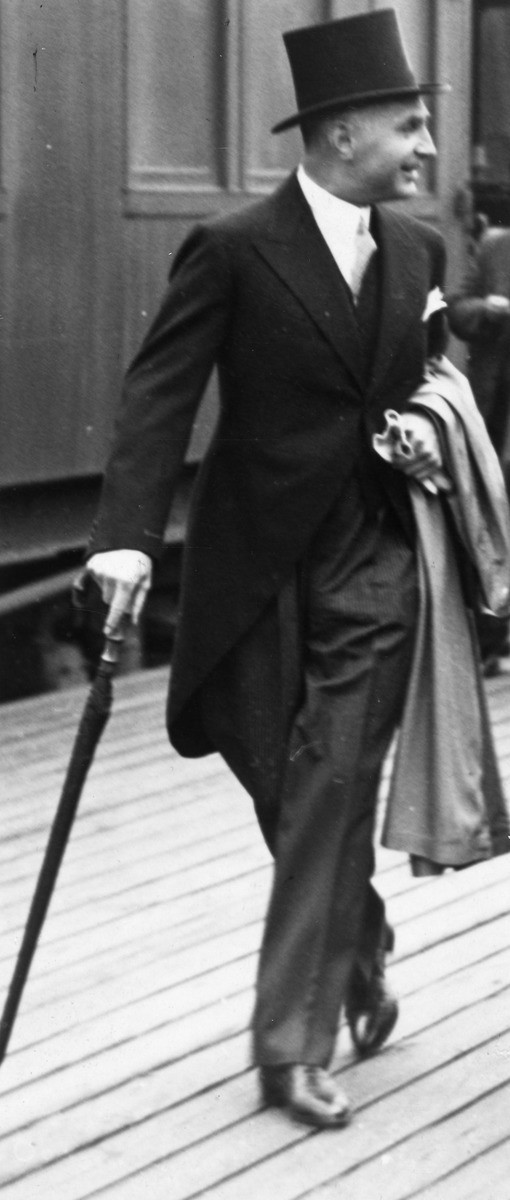

Rasmus Skylstad (11 July 1893 – 17 October 1972) was a Norwegian diplomat.

He was born in Hjørundfjord Municipality. He worked as a secretary in the Norwegian Ministry of Foreign Affairs from 1924. He served as permanent under-secretary of state of the Ministry from 1948 to 1958. He was the Norwegian ambassador to France from 1958. He was decorated Commander with Star of the Royal Norwegian Order of St. Olav in 1946.

Civic offices
Preceded by Rolf Andvord	Permanent under-secretary of state for the Ministry of Foreign Affairs; 1948–1958	Succeeded by Johan Georg Alexius Ræder
Diplomatic posts
Preceded by Rolf Andvord	Norwegian Ambassador to France; 1958–1963	Succeeded by Rolf Andersen
