= Bærums Verk =

- Village
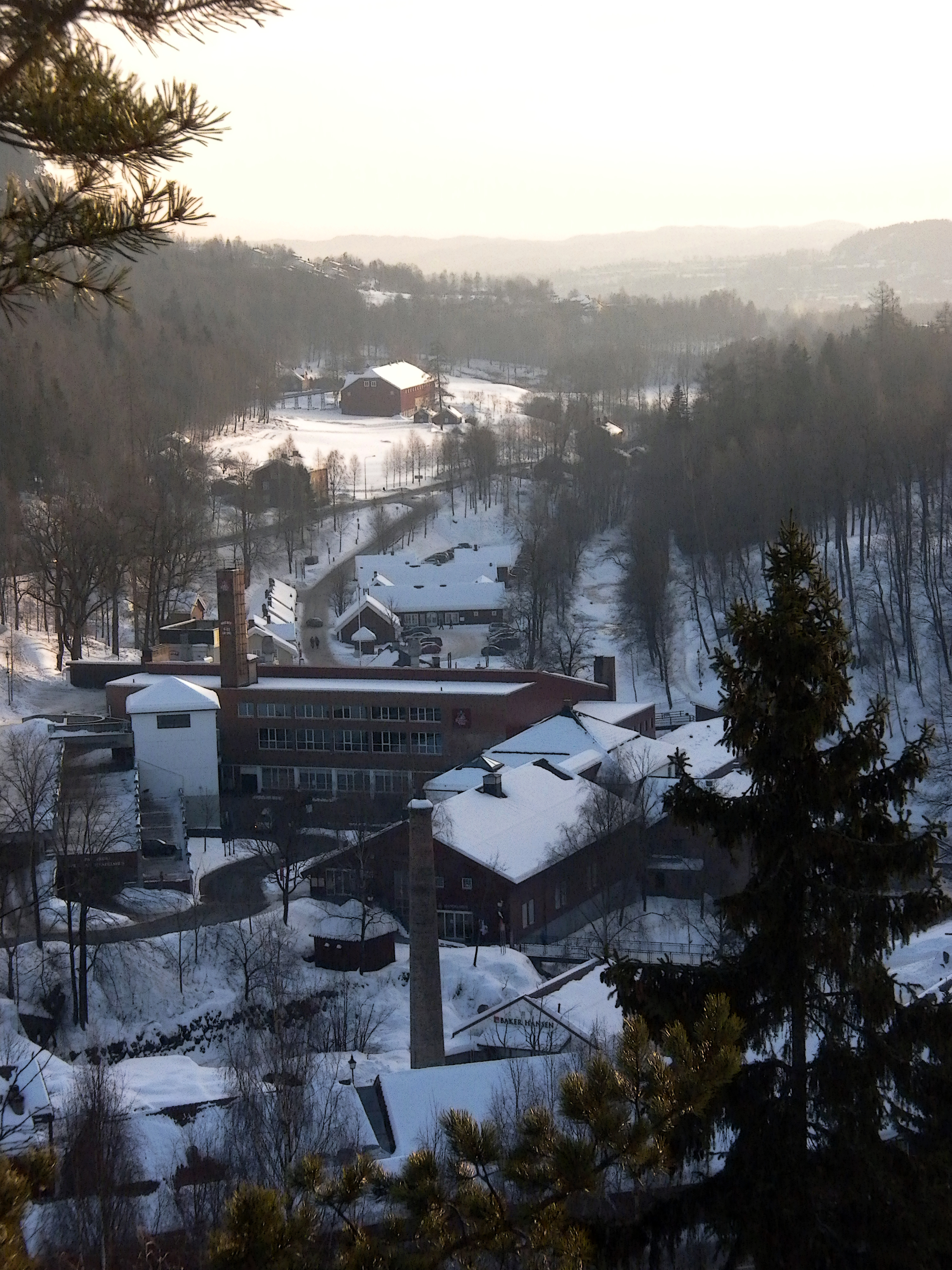
- Bærums Verk from Ormekollen, just north of the village
- Interactive map of Bærums Verk
- Coordinates: 59°56′35″N 10°30′27″E
- County: Viken
- Municipality: Bærum
- Elevation: 145 m (476 ft)

Population (2005-01-01)
  - Total: 7,565
- Time zone: UTC+1 (Central European Time)
  - Summer (DST): UTC+2 (Central European Summer Time)
- Postal code: 1353

Bærums Verk is a village in Bærum in Akershus, Norway, with a population of about 8000. It is located on both sides of the river Lomma.

== History ==
Iron ore was found in the areas now known as Kirkerud and Eineåsen in Bærum in 1603 and 1604, and in 1610 Christian IV granted Paul Smelter the right to build, at his own expense, a foundry in the area. The first foundry was built near the farm of Wøyen, further downriver from today's Bærums Verk, and then another one at Gommerud, closer. In 1615 Smelter bought several farms at the present site and consolidated the foundry in one center. This was unusual practice at the time, but turned out to be successful. All other foundries in Oslo, Aker, and Bærum were shut down as a consequence, and Smelter achieved a virtual monopoly in the Oslo area.

The crown ran the works until 1624 when Det Norske Jernkompani took over and mismanaged to the point that the foundry was shut down in 1641, after a flood had damaged much of the plant in 1638. Gabriel Marcelis (the elder), a Dutch merchant with close ties to the Danish crown, took over operations in 1641 and invested in a double blast furnace that produced nails, iron parts, bullets, and cannonballs.

The Krefting family took over the works in 1664 and built on Marcelis's investments to expand the capacity at Bærums Verk. Especially under the administration of Anna Krefting (née Vogt) from 1712 to 1766, the works grew to become the largest of its kind in Norway. Even after a devastating fire in 1762, Anna rebuilt the entire plant in two years. After Anna Krefting's death in 1766, her family sold the works to an investment company.

In 1773, Conrad Clausen, then only 18, took over the works and continued Krefting's efforts to expand its activities. He rebuilt the blast furnace so it could run also when there was low water flow in Lomma, built a school on the site, and included also the works at Fossum at Lysakerelven in the operations. Clausen died in 1785, only 31 years old. His widow ran the works for a few years but sold it to Peder Anker, the owner of Bogstad.

Peder Anker connected Bærums Verk to his growing commercial network, among other things by building Ankerveien, connecting Bærums Verk with Fossum (and thereby Bogstad), Sognsvann, Maridalen and ultimately Hakadalen via Greveveien.

After Peder Anker died in 1824, Herman Wedel Jarlsberg took over the works, passing it on to his son Harald Wedel Jarlsberg in 1840. The Wedel Jarlsberg family were among the last nobility in Norway and were active both in national and local politics. On May 22, 1874, the blast furnace was shut down and replaced by a regular cast iron works and workshop.

In 1889, the works went into the Løvenskiold family through inheritance, where it remains to this day. Production was diversified to include a large variety of cast iron products. The works were closed down in 1964, and in the 1980s large surrounding tracts were developed for residential purposes. In 1997, the old factory site was redeveloped as a retail commercial center. Several of the buildings are protected, including Norway's oldest tavern.

== Current use ==
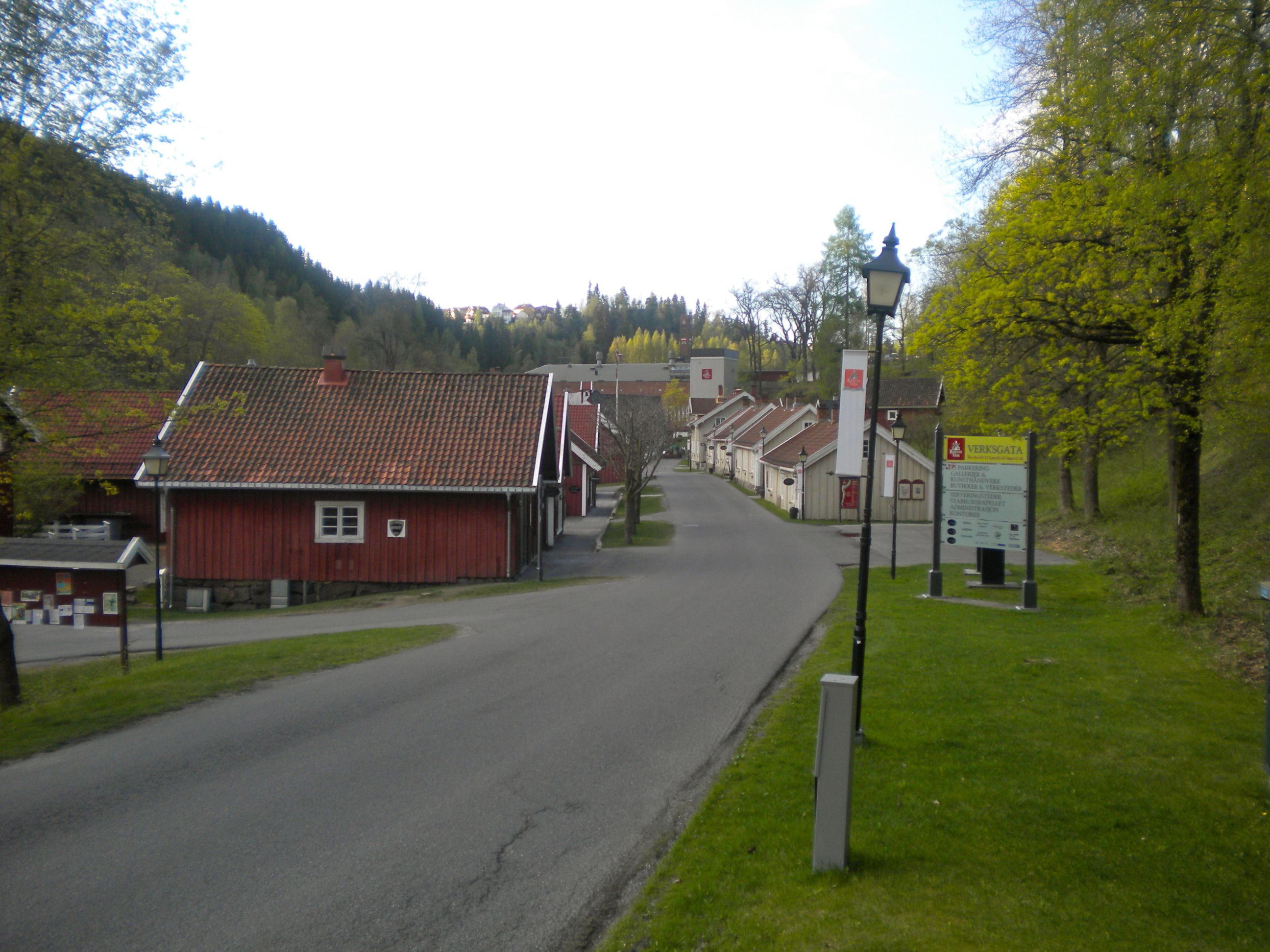
Verksgata on the site of the old foundry

The center now known as Bærums Verk is situated on the site of the old foundry, nestled in a narrow valley along the river Lomma. The buildings straddle the river, with several pedestrian bridges connecting them. The center includes several restaurants, two supermarkets, and several specialty retail stores.

The foundry itself has been converted into a shopping centre. The shopping centre is owned by the Løvenskiold family, who also owns the Maxbo hardware store chain. A museum, featuring ovens produced in the foundry from the 18th century up to 1964, and shops with products handcrafted on site are situated in the old buildings.
