= Carl Otto Løvenskiold =

Norwegian politician

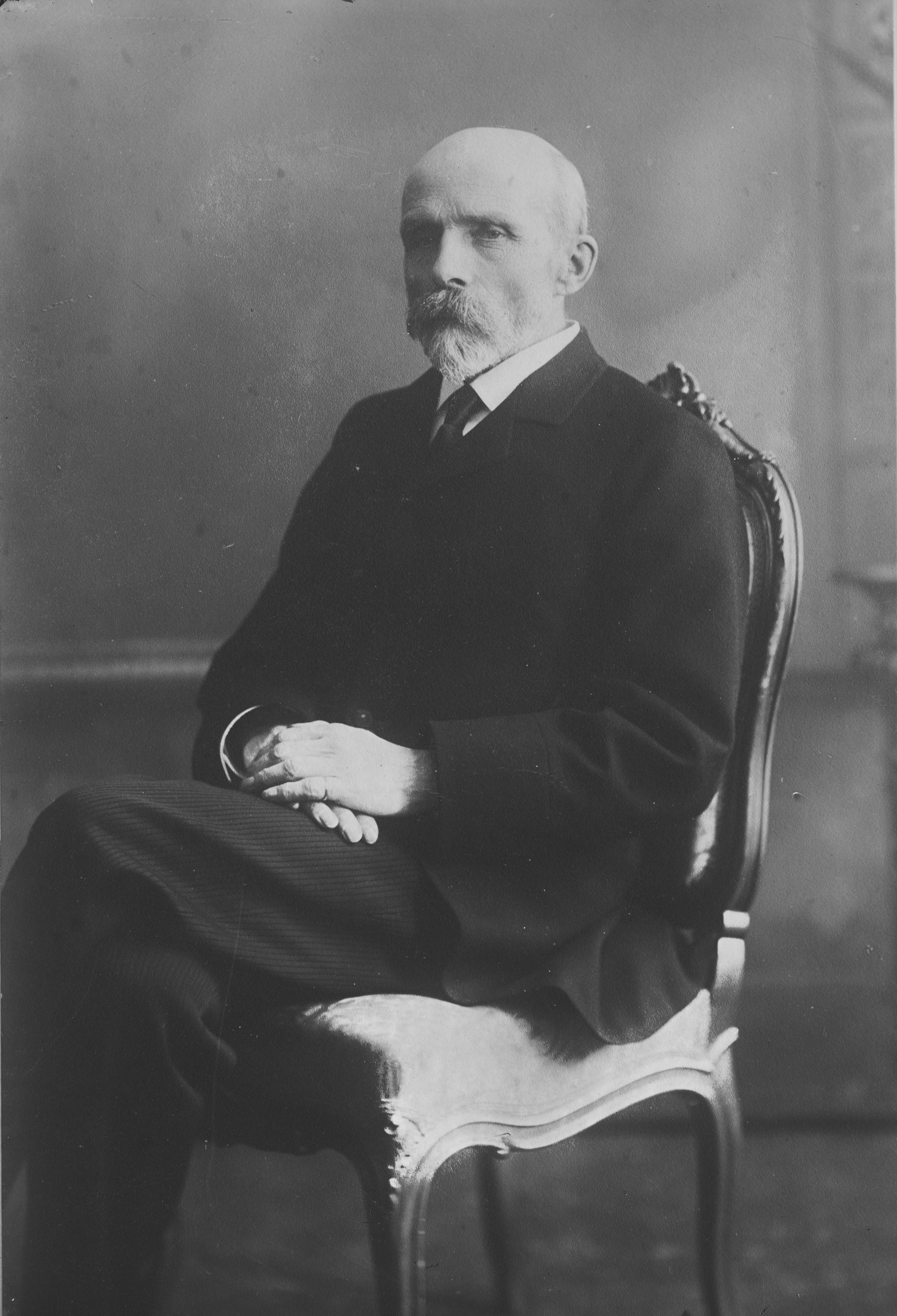
- Carl Otto Løvenskiold (1839–1916)

Norwegian Prime Minister in Stockholm
- In office 3 April 1884 – 26 June 1884
- Monarch: Oscar II
- Prime Minister: Christian Schweigaard
- Preceded by: Otto R. Kierulf
- Succeeded by: Ole J. Richter

Personal details
- Born: 23 December 1839 Christiania, United Kingdoms and Sweden and Norway
- Died: 1 October 1916 (aged 76) Aker, Norway
- Spouse: Elise Løvenskiold
- Parent: Otto Joachim Løvenskiold
- Occupation: Naval officer, business executive and land owner.

Carl Otto Løvenskiold (23 December 1839 – 1 October 1916) was a Norwegian naval officer, business executive and landowner. He served as the Norwegian prime minister in Stockholm during 1884. By birth, he is a member of Løvenskiold noble family.

== Biography ==
Løvenskiold was born in Christiania (now Oslo), Norway on 23 December 1839. He was the son of Otto Joachim Løvenskiold (1811-1882) and Julie Caroline Helene Wedel-Jarlsberg (1815-1840). His father was a Supreme Court Attorney and mayor of Christiania. He attended Christiania Cathedral School, became a sea cadet at Frederiksvern and a second lieutenant in the Royal Norwegian Navy in 1859. In 1868 Løvenskiold was promoted to first lieutenant. In 1875, he resigned from naval service. He entered into the operation of the business interests of his father-in-law Harald Wedel Jarlsberg in Bærum and Aker, including Bærum Verk and Nordmarka.

He was a Prime Minister in Stockholm in 1884 during Schweigaard's Ministerium. He served as a member of the Parliament of Norway (Storting) from 1889 to 1897 representing Akershus for the Conservative Party.

Løvenskiold was nominated as a Knight in the Order of St. Olav in 1889, Knight 1st Class in 1899 and Commander in 1912. He also was a recipient of the Order of Vasa. The Spitsbergen icecap Løvenskioldfonna and the mountain ridge Carlsfjella were named in his honor.

== Personal life ==
In 1865, he married his cousin Elise Wedel Jarlsberg (1844-1923), daughter of landowner Harald Wedel Jarlsberg (1811–97) and Elise Frederikke Butenschøn (1820–68). They were the parents of Harald Løvenskiold (1868–1934). Løvenskiold died on 1 October 1916 and was buried in the family grave site at Ullern Church (Ullern kirkegård) in Oslo.

Political offices
Preceded by Wolfgang Wenzel von Haffner	Prime Minister in Stockholm; April 1884–June 1884	Succeeded by Ole Jørgen Richter
