= Løvenskiold family =

Dano-Norwegian noble family

Løvenskiold
- Patrician
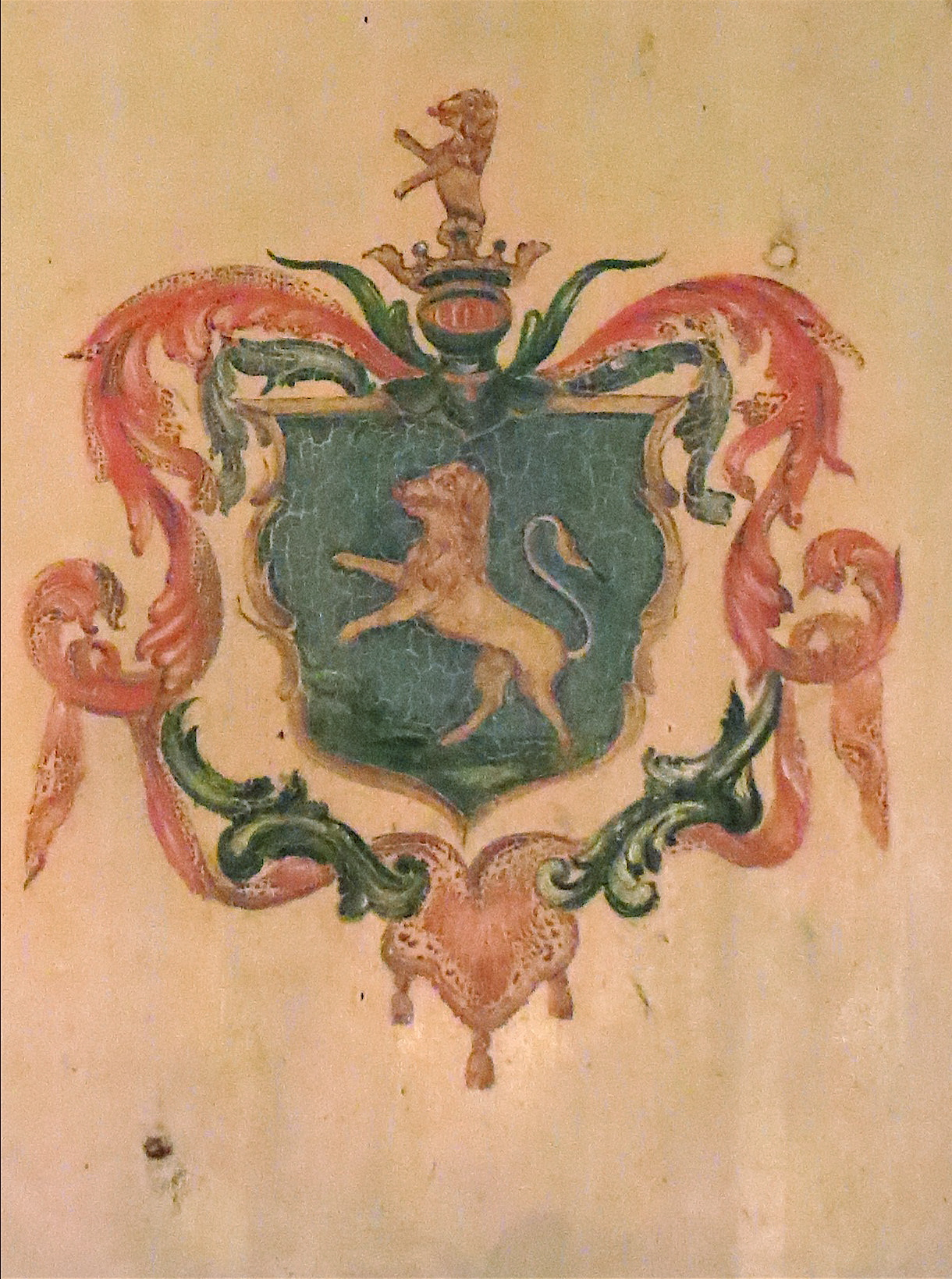
- Coat of arms of the Løvenskiold family
- Country: Denmark; Norway
- Place of origin: Germany
- Founded: 1739 (noble status)
- Founder: Herman Leopoldus
- Historic seat: Løvenborg; Vækerø Manor
- Titles: Baron of Løvenskiold

The Løvenskiold family (until 1739 Leopoldus) is a Dano-Norwegian noble family of German origin. Members of the family now live primarily in Norway. Originally named Leopoldus, it was one of the early patrician Norwegian families to buy noble status, in 1739, when it was also granted the surname Løvenskiold.

== History ==
=== Origins ===
The Løvenskiold family descend from merchant Herman Leopoldus (died 1696), who immigrated from Lübeck to Christiania (now Oslo, Norway). His son, also named Herman Leopoldus (1677–1750), became wealthy. Both he and his two sons, Herman Løvenskiold (1701–1759) and Severin Leopoldus Løvenskiold (1719-76), who were half brothers, were ennobled by letters patent in 1739, by paying the king's private fund (partikulærkassen). At the same time, they received the surname Løvenskiold (lit. ‘Lion Shield’).

=== Herman Løvenskiold (1701–1759) ===
Herman Løvenskiold (1701–1759) was married to Margrete Deichman (1708-1758). They were the parents of the following children:

- Bartholomæus Herman von Løvenskiold (1729-1788)
- Inger Hedvig de Løvenskiold
- Anna Barbara Løvenskiold
- Herman Leopoldus von Løvenskiold (1739–1799), chamberlain
- Severin Løvenskiold(1743–1818), chamberlain and baron
  - Severin Løvenskiold (1777–1856) who served as governor-general of Norway.

=== Severin Leopoldus Løvenskiold (1719-76) ===
Severin Leopoldus Løvenskiold (1719–76) was married to lensbaronesse Magdalene Charlotte Hedevig von Numsen. They were the parents of Michael Herman Løvenskiold. He was married to Frederikke Juliane Marie Knuth-Knuthenborg. They were the parents of the following children:

- Carl Severin Christian Herman baron Løvenskiold
- Eggert Christopher Løvenskiold
- Marie Frederikke Constance Baronesse Løvenskjold
- Henrik Ludvig Baron Løvenskjold
- Charlotte Wilhelmine Christiane Løvenskjold

== Property ==
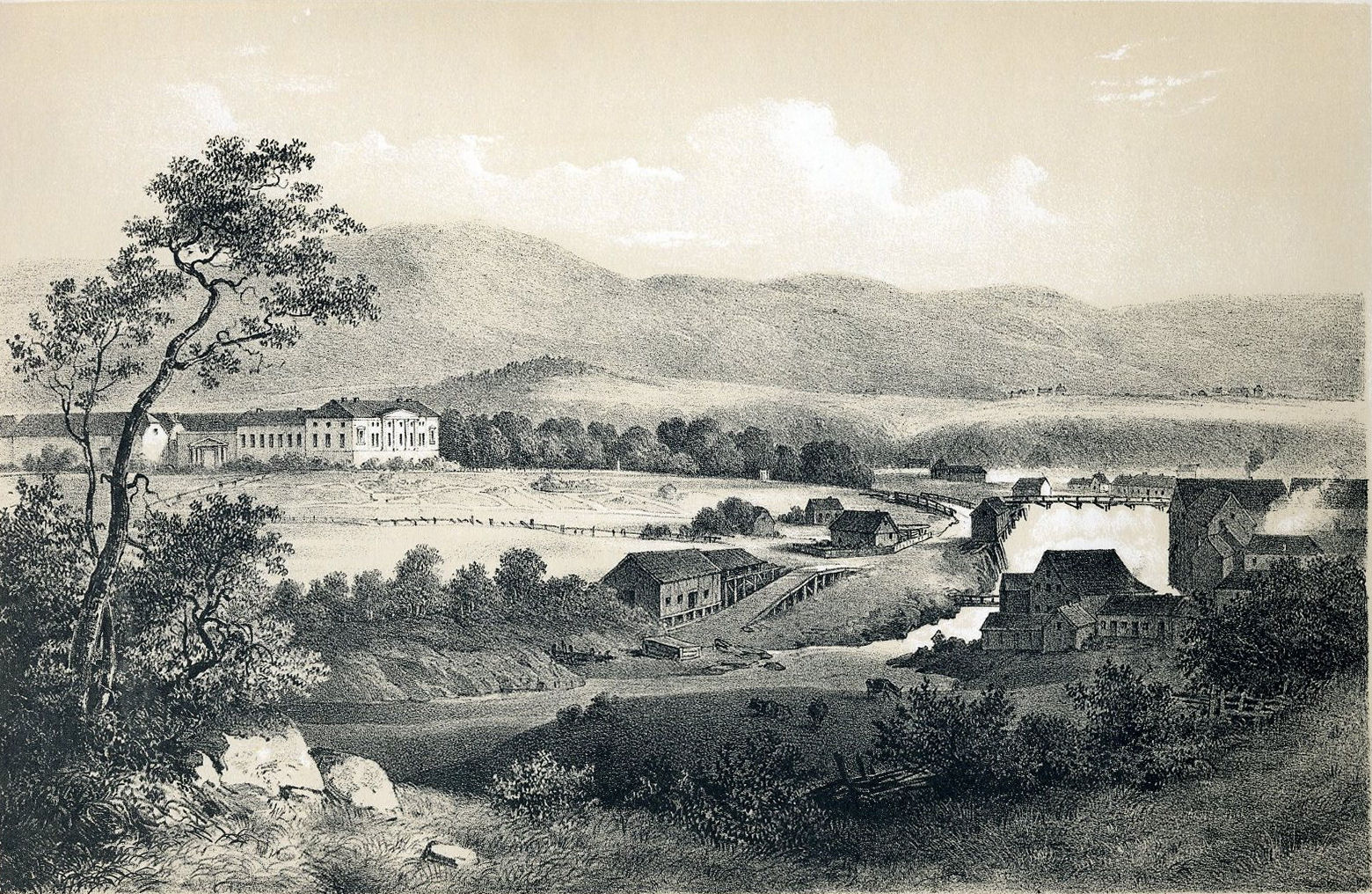
Fossum Manor and ironworks. 1848

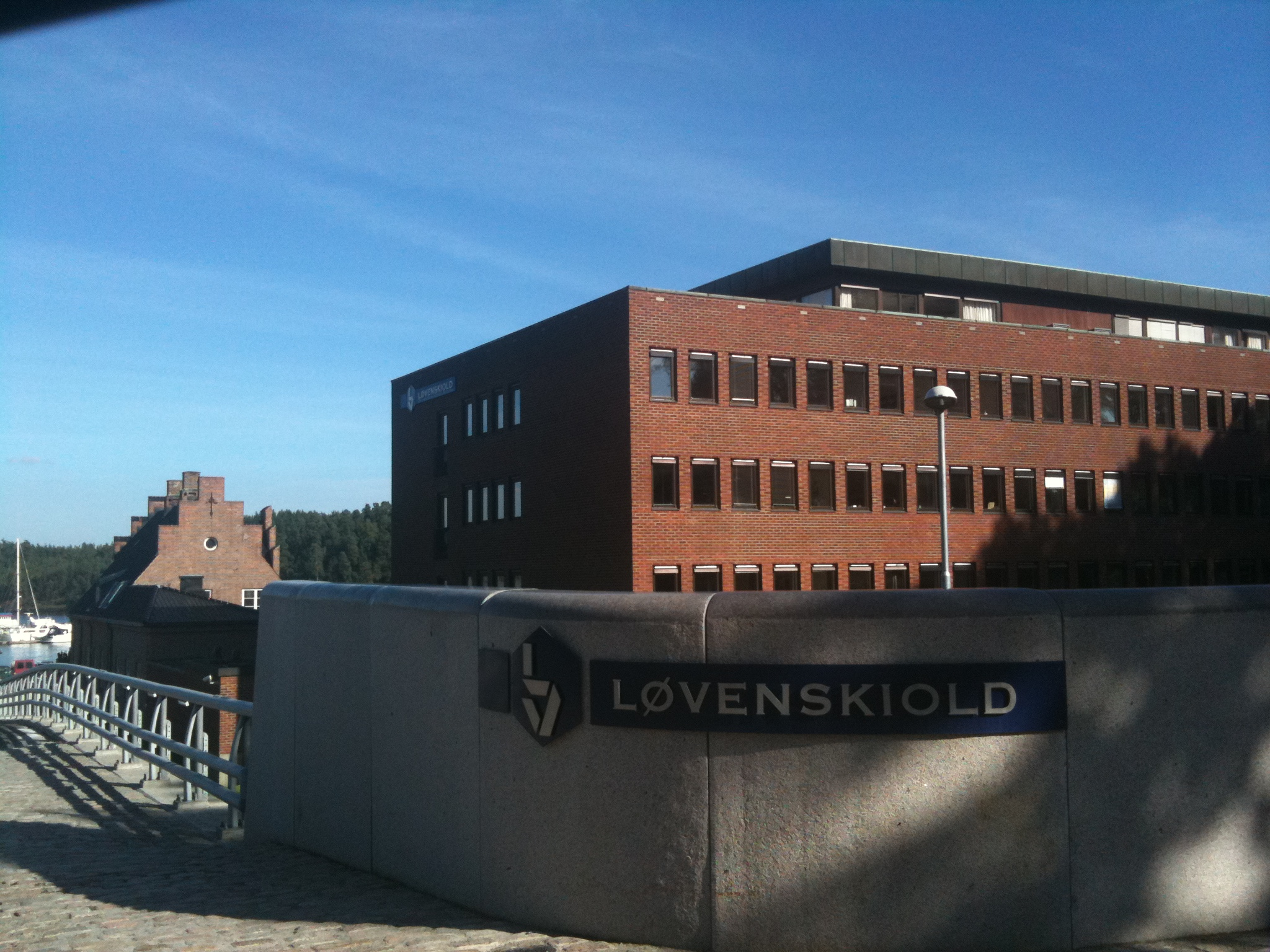
Løvenskiold-Vækerø headquarters in Oslo

Members of the family have owned a number of historic homes in Denmark and Norway including Løvenborg Castle (Løvenborg Slot) at Merløse in Holbæk, Holden Manor (Holden hovedgård) at Ulefoss in Telemark and Fossum Manor (Fossum hovedgård) at Fossum Ironworks in Skien. Other family estates included Vækerø Manor west of Bærums Verk in Bærum and the Ask estate in Ringerike (Ask storgård i Ringerike).

The name is also given to the family's privately owned company Løvenskiold-Vækerø, headquartered at Ullern. The holding company owns vast tracts of woodland in and around Oslo, Akershus, Oppland, Buskerud and Telemark, as well as the building materials retail chain Maxbo.

== Coats of arms ==
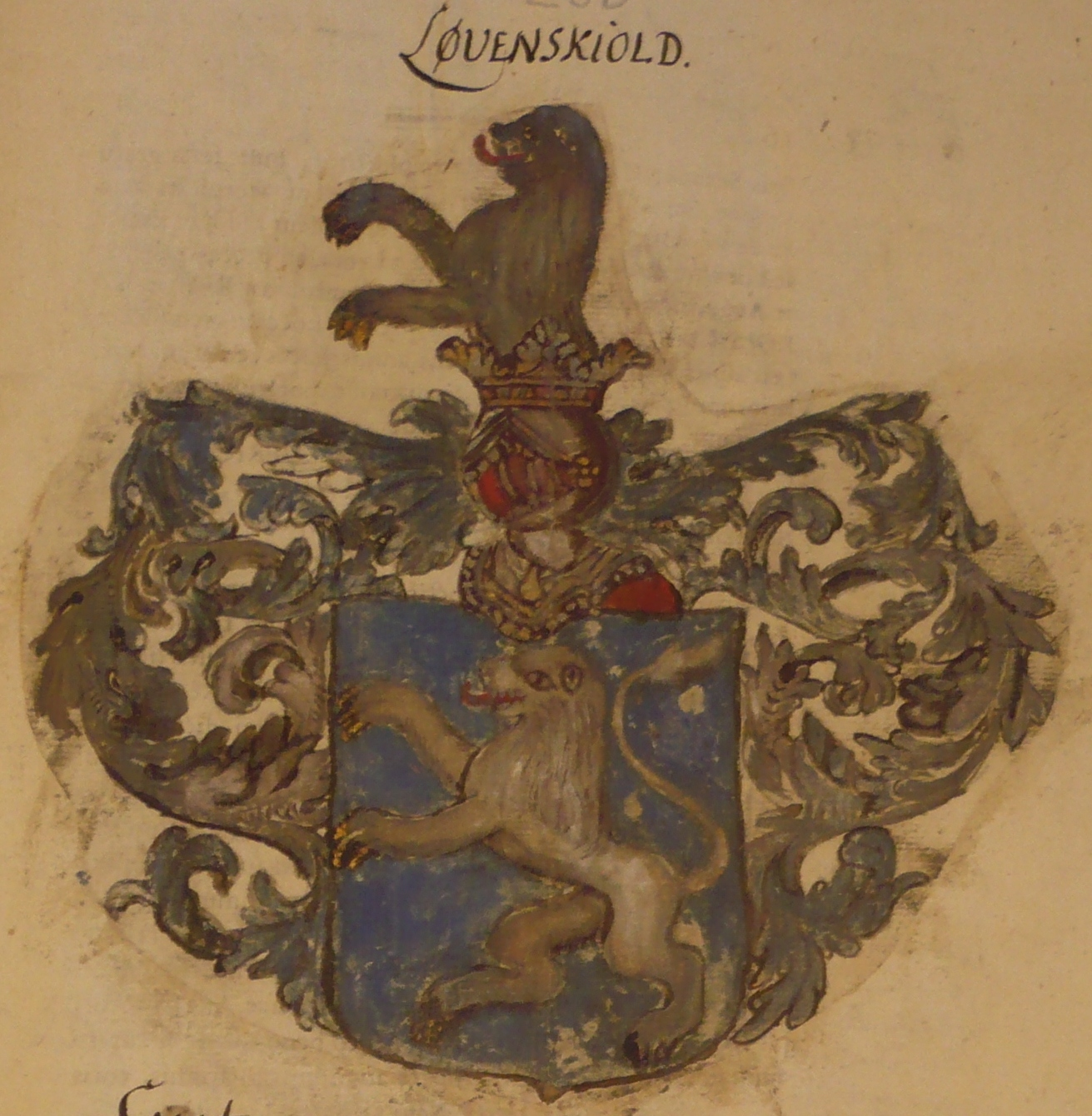
Heraldic arms of the family of Løvenskjold from 1739

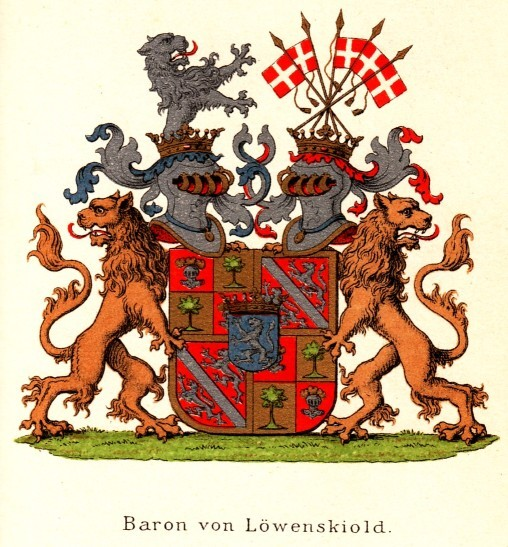
Coat of arms of the baronial family Løvenskiold from 1889

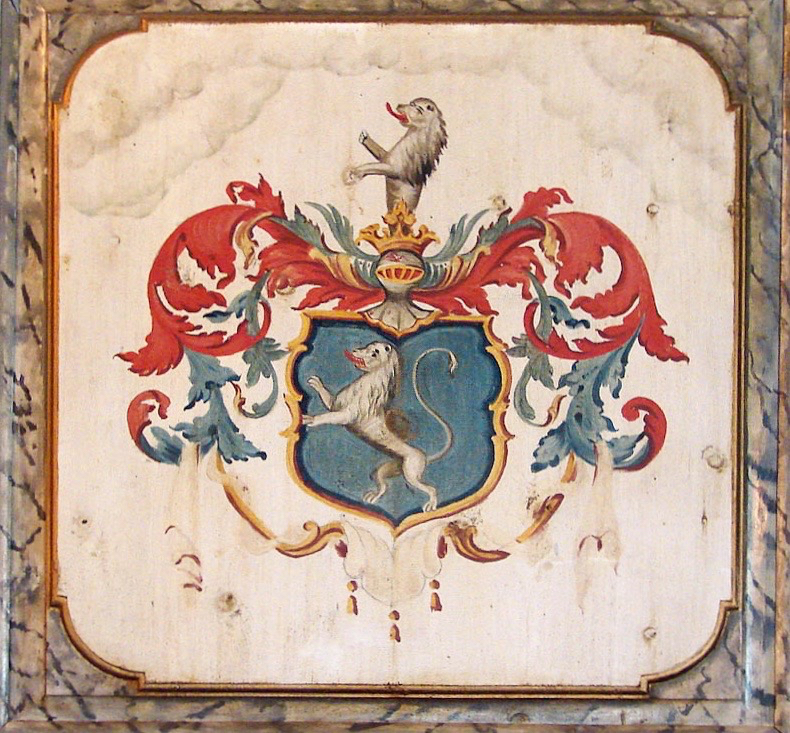
Løvenskiold coat of arms from Solum Church, Telemark

== Notable family members ==
See Category:Løvenskiold family.

== In popular culture ==
The 2022 Danish film The Kiss portrays Baron von Løvenskjold and his daughter Edith.

== See also ==
- Danish nobility
- Norwegian nobility

== Literature ==
- Salmonsens Konversationsleksikon (Copenhagen: J H Schultz Forlag, second edition. 1915 to 1930).
- Danmarks Adels Aarbog, Copenhagen 1949
- Axel Løvenskiold and Herman L. Løvenskiold: Slekten Løvenskiold gjennom 300 år i Norge, Oslo 1974
- Hans Cappelen: Norske Slektsvåpen (Norwegian Family Coats of Arms) with an English Summary, Oslo 1969 (2nd ed. 1976), p. 31 and 161
- Bratberg, Terje. "Løvenskiold". Store norske leksikon (in Norwegian). Oslo: Kunnskapsforlaget.
