= Severin Løvenskiold =

Norwegian politician (1777–1856)

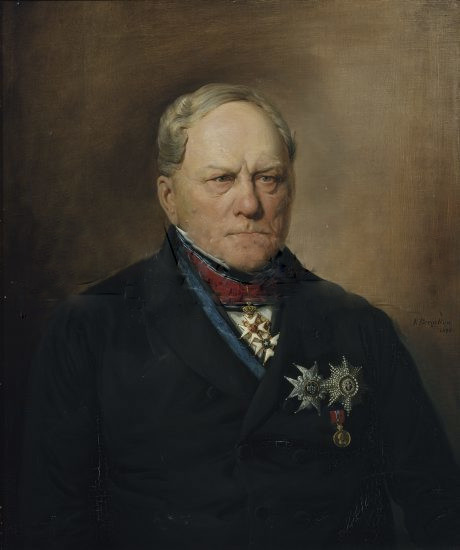

Governor-general of Norway
- In office 27 February 1841 – 17 June 1856
- Monarch: Oscar I
- Preceded by: Herman Wedel-Jarlsberg
- Succeeded by: Position abolished

Norwegian Prime Minister in Stockholm
- In office 10 July 1828 – 27 February 1841
- Monarch: Charles III John
- Preceded by: Mathias Sommerhielm
- Succeeded by: Frederik Due

Personal details
- Born: 7 February 1777 Porsgrunn, Norway
- Died: 15 September 1856 (aged 79) Gjerpen, Norway
- Occupation: Nobleman
- Profession: Politician
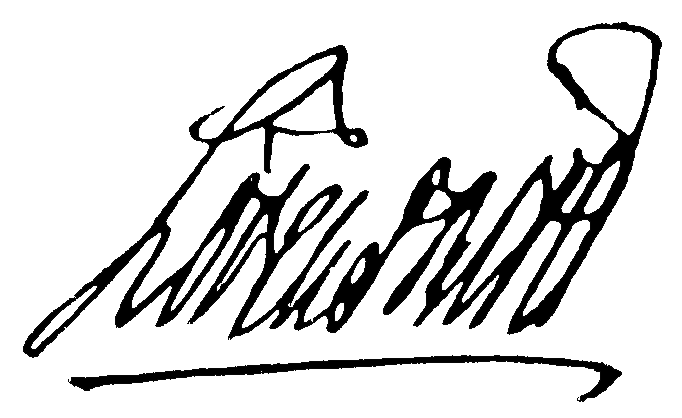
- Signature

Severin Løvenskiold (7 February 1777 – 15 September 1856) was a Norwegian nobleman, politician and the prime minister of Norway.

== Family ==
Severin Løvenskiold, the younger, was born in Porsgrunn in Telemark, Norway to Severin Løvenskiold, the elder, and Benedicte Henriette née Aall. In 1802, he married Countess Hedevig Sophie Knuth.

== Education and offices ==
When Løvenskiold was nine years old, he was sent to Germany, where he received his formal education. After studies in Wandsbek near Hamburg, in Eutin, in Saxony and in Silesia, where he studied mining, he returned in 1794 at the age of 17 years. He earned a degree in law at the University of Copenhagen in 1796. After a few years of public service in Christiania, he assumed responsibility for some of the family's holdings in 1802. From 1803-1813, he was appointed to be the county governor for Bratsberg amt, a position which made him the Kings representative for the whole county.

== Political life ==
After nine years as the Dano-Norwegian king's representative, Severin Løvenskiold resigned this position in 1813, and in the following year, he was elected to the constitutional assembly at Eidsvoll Manor. Løvenskiold was during the convention an enthusiastic member of the so-called 'Union Party', which advocated a union with Sweden, and he made notable efforts to retain the nobility in Norway. When noble titles and privileges in fact were abolished in a process starting with the Nobility Law of 1821, Løvenskiold went on record against the decision, finding it unjust and in violation with promises of eternal noble status in 1739 given from King Christian VI to his father, Severin Løvenskiold, the eldest.

His position against the dissolution of nobility is a good example of Løvenskiold's position in many contemporary political issues. His conservatism, which sometimes could appear as reactionary, was reflected in his refusal of measures leading to a popular democracy, particularly so in 1836 when the laws on municipal democracy were sanctioned by the king—against Løvenskiold's advice. He maintained that the peasants lacked the necessary level of education and political understanding to govern national affairs, a view the king in reality shared with him. However, King Charles III John accepted the municipal laws. Løvenskiold was very loyal to the King, and he was granted the position of prime minister in Stockholm for several years until he was appointed governor of Norway in 1841.

== Political legacy ==
Despite his strongly conservative political views, Severin Løvenskiold was not without interest in progress in a more technical way. During the last years of his position, Norway established its first railroad, its first telegraphic lines, and a system of common postage and stamps. Several laws were established, helping the development of different types of industries in Norway. The honour for this goes mostly to Frederik Stang, but Løvenskiold must definitely have accepted and probably, at least to some extent, approved of this change. When Løvenskiold died in 1856, it was politically impossible to appoint a new governor. His anti-democratic attitude had left both him and the position isolated from most of the political establishment in Norway.

== Gallery ==
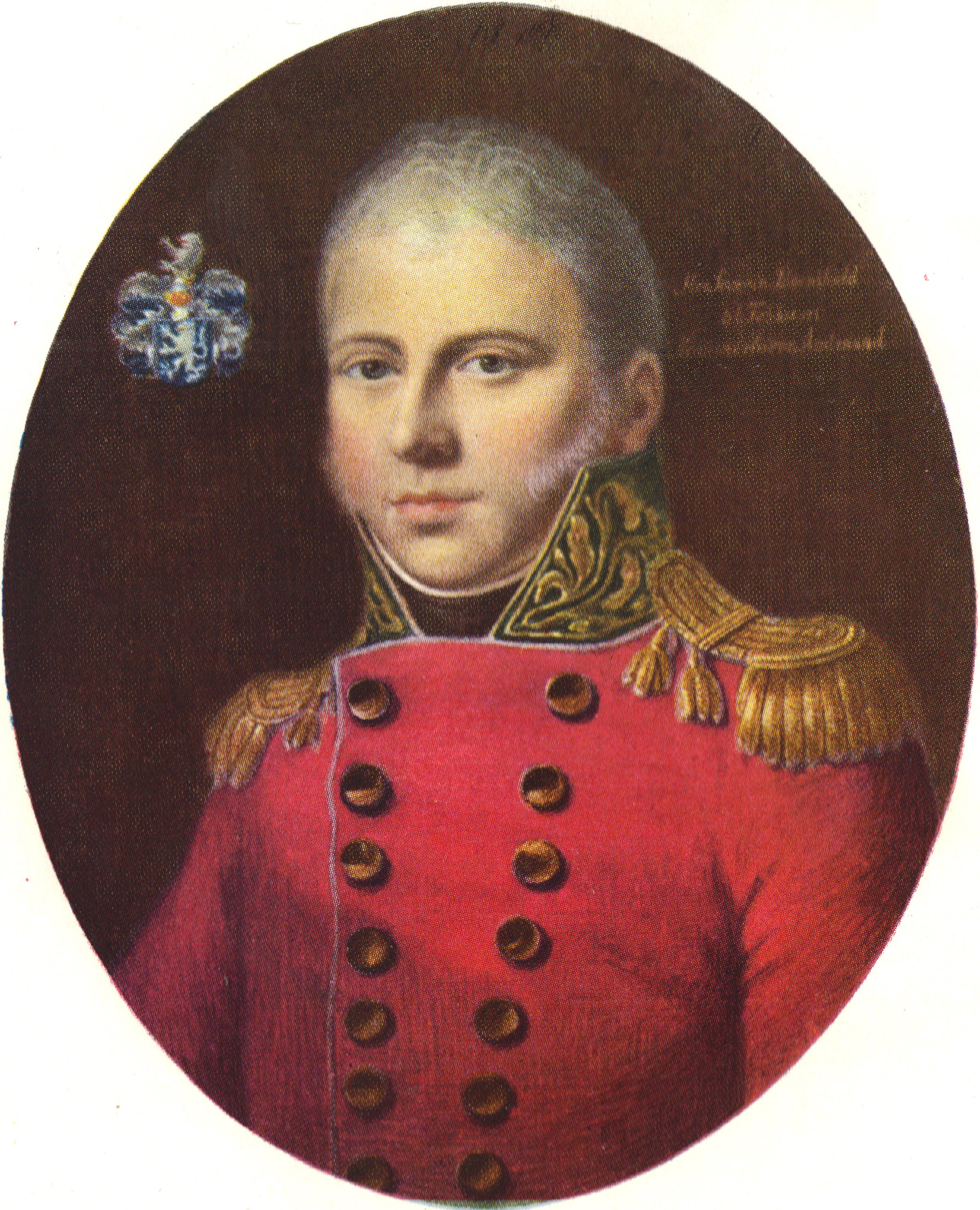
Løvenskiold as a young man

Severin Løvenskiold in mid-life

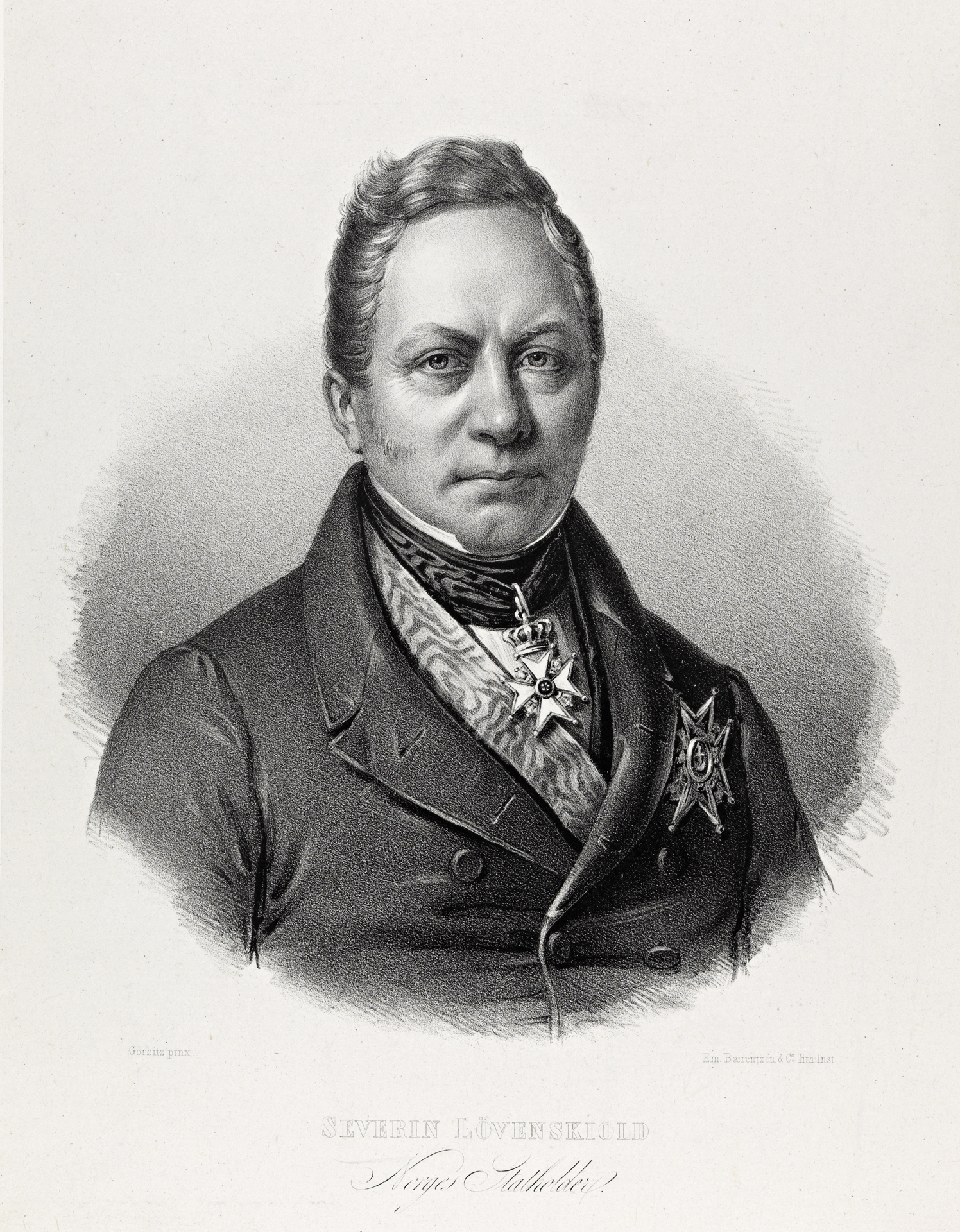
Severin Løvenskiold in later years

== See also ==
- Løvenskiold
- Danish nobility
- Norwegian nobility

== Other sources ==
- Holme, Jørn (2014) De kom fra alle kanter – eidsvollsmennene og deres hus (Oslo: Cappelen Damm) ISBN 978-82-02-44564-5
- Gisle, Jon (2010) Jusleksikon (Oslo: Kunnskapsforlaget) ISBN 9788257321048
- Andenæs, Johs (2006) Statsforfatningen i Norge (Oslo: Universitetsforlaget) ISBN 9788215009896

Government offices
Preceded by Jens Andreas Selmer	County Governor of Bratsberg amt 1803–1813	Succeeded by Fredrik Wilhelm Wedel-Jarlsberg
Political offices
Preceded by Mathias Sommerhielm	Norwegian Prime Minister in Stockholm; 1828-1841; Served under: King Charles III John	Succeeded by Frederik Due
Preceded by Herman Wedel-Jarlsberg	Governor-general of Norway; 1841–1856	Position abolished
