= Ibsen (family) =

Norwegian family of Danish extraction

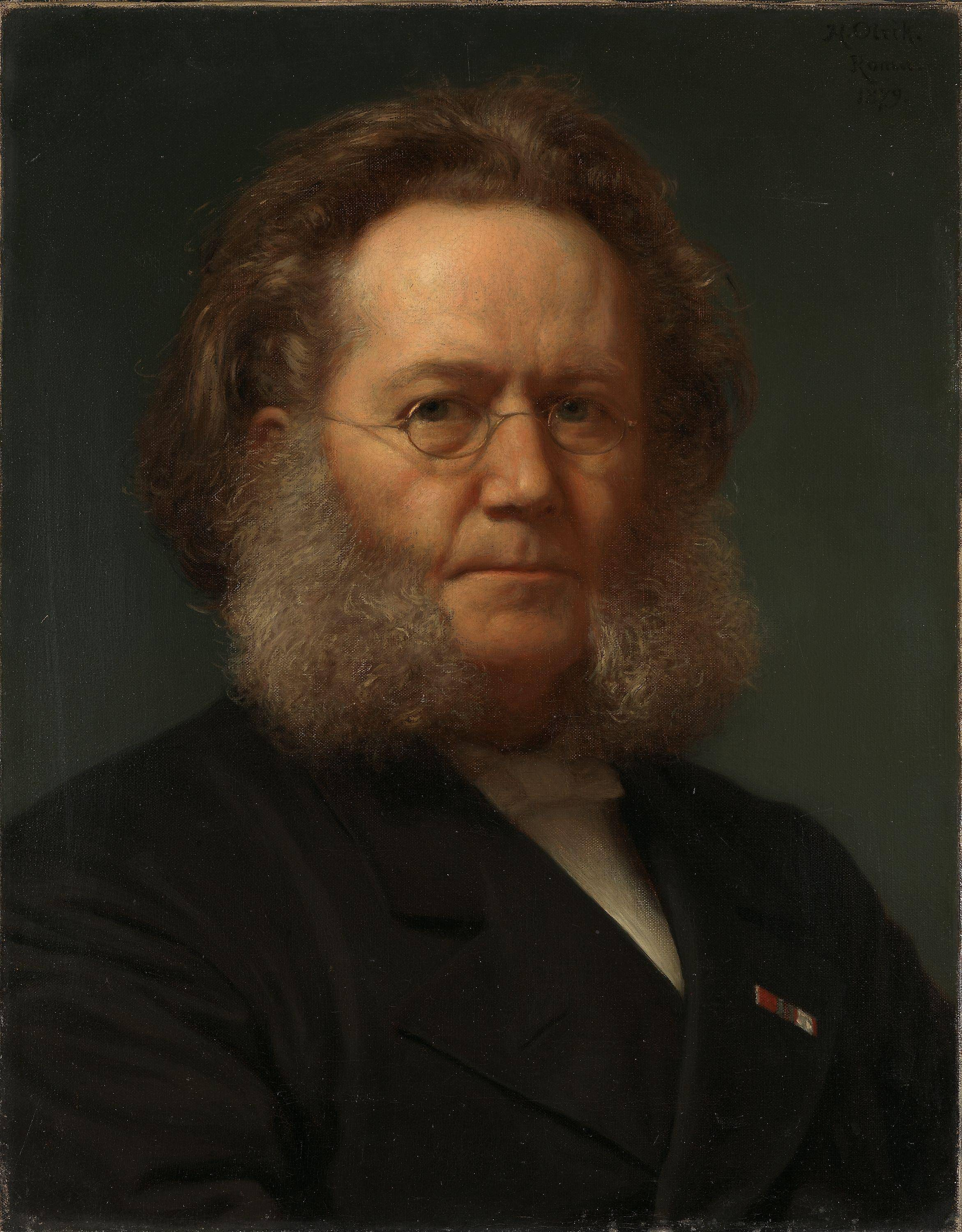
Playwright Henrik Ibsen

Ibsen is a Norwegian family of Danish extraction. Its most famous members are playwright Henrik Ibsen, his son, statesman Sigurd Ibsen, and grandson, pioneer film director Tancred Ibsen.

== History ==
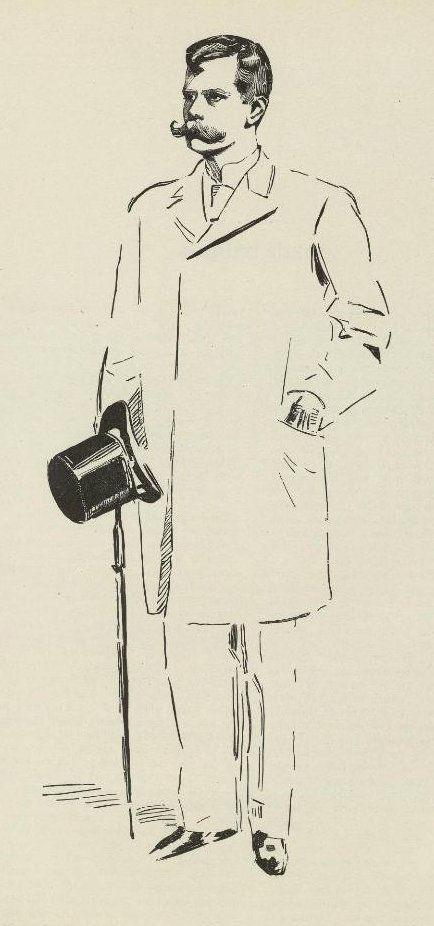
Prime Minister Sigurd Ibsen

The name Ibsen is a "frozen" patronymic, meaning "son of Ib." Ib is a Danish variant of Jacob. The name became frozen in the 17th century, while this practice was only widely adopted in Denmark in the 19th century and in Norway from around 1900. The phenomenon of patronymics becoming frozen started in the 17th century in bourgeois families in Denmark.

The family's earliest known ancestor is Rasmus Ibsen (1632–1703), a merchant in Stege, Denmark. Rasmus Ibsen's son, ship's captain and merchant Peter Ibsen (died 1765), settled in Norway as a burgher of Bergen. Peter's son Henrik Ibsen (1726–1765) became a ship's captain in Bergen. After his father died early and his mother Wenche Dishington remarried, Henrik's son Henrik Johan Ibsen (1765–1797) grew up in the household of parish priest Jacob von der Lippe, his stepfather. After Henrik Johan Ibsen, a ship's captain and merchant in Skien, died at sea outside Hesnes, his widow Johanne Plesner remarried to ship's captain Ole Paus, and their son Knud Ibsen grew up in the Paus household at Rising in Gjerpen. Knud Ibsen had several half siblings, among them judge and Member of Parliament Christian Cornelius Paus and banker and shipowner Christopher Blom Paus. Knud Ibsen married the niece of his stepfather, Marichen Altenburg (a daughter of shipowner Johan Andreas Altenburg and Hedevig Christine Paus), and became a prominent merchant in Skien. Knud and Marichen Ibsen were the parents of playwright Henrik Ibsen (married to Suzannah Thoresen), who in turn was the father of Prime Minister Sigurd Ibsen (married to Bergliot Bjørnson, the only daughter of Bjørnstjerne Bjørnson) and grandfather of film director Tancred Ibsen (married to Lillebil Krohn), novelist Irene Ibsen Bille (married to Josias Bille) and Eleonora Ibsen. Tancred's only child was diplomat Tancred Ibsen Jr.

The Ibsen family is becoming extinct (in the male line); the last living members (by birth) are Tancred Ibsen Jr.'s two daughters Nora and Hedda Ibsen. There are however a number of descendants of the family through female lines, namely descendants of Hedvig Ibsen (married Stousland), Irene Ibsen (married Bille), Nora Ibsen and Hedda Ibsen.

== The Ibsen family in theatre ==
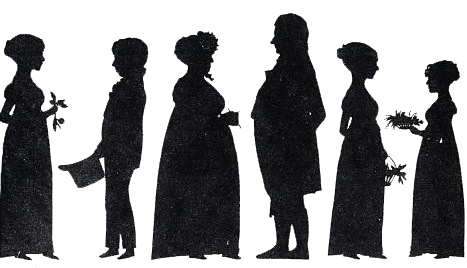
Marichen Altenburg (married Ibsen), far right, with parents and relatives

Henrik Ibsen's ancestry has been a much studied subject, due to his perceived foreignness (leading his biographer Henrik Jæger to famously state that "the ancestral Ibsen was a Dane") and due to the influence of his biography and family on his plays. Ibsen often made references to his family in his plays, sometimes by name, or by modelling characters after them. Hence, both of Eric's parents, Knud Ibsen and Marichen Ibsen, served as the models for various characters, a fact admitted by Henrik Ibsen. "Jon Gynt" in Peer Gynt, "Old Ekdahl" in The Wild Duck and Daniel Hejre in The League of Youth are widely considered to be based on Knud Ibsen. Marichen Ibsen is considered the model for "Åse" in Peer Gynt and "Inga of Varteig" in The Pretenders, and she would "echo through her son's work in unremitting portrayals of suffering women." More broadly, Ibsen used his own biography, relatives and ancestors as a background for his plays and characters. The Gynt family's prosperous ancestor, Rasmus Gynt, is probably named for Rasmus Ibsen, the oldest known Ibsen, and modelled after Ibsen's wealthy maternal grandfather, Johan Andreas Altenburg. Ibsen's great-aunt Kristine Cathrine Ploug (née Altenburg), who lived with the Ibsen family, served as the model for characters such as "The Rat-Wife" in Little Eyolf. The character "Hedvig" in The Wild Duck is named for Ibsen's sister Hedvig Ibsen and/or his grandmother Hedevig Paus. Ibsen's plays often take place in bourgeois circles in small towns reminiscent of Skien, resembling the social environment of his childhood.

== Members ==
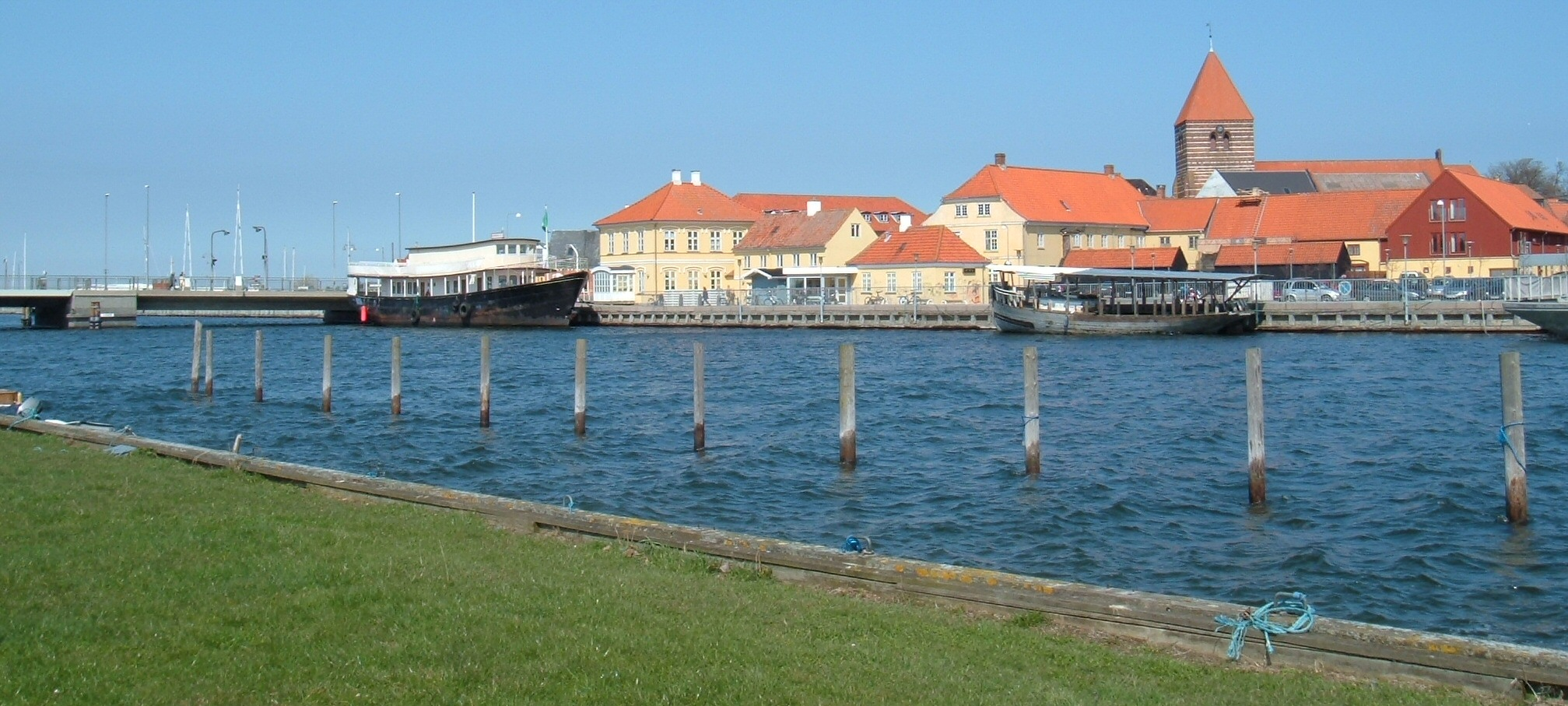
Stege, Denmark

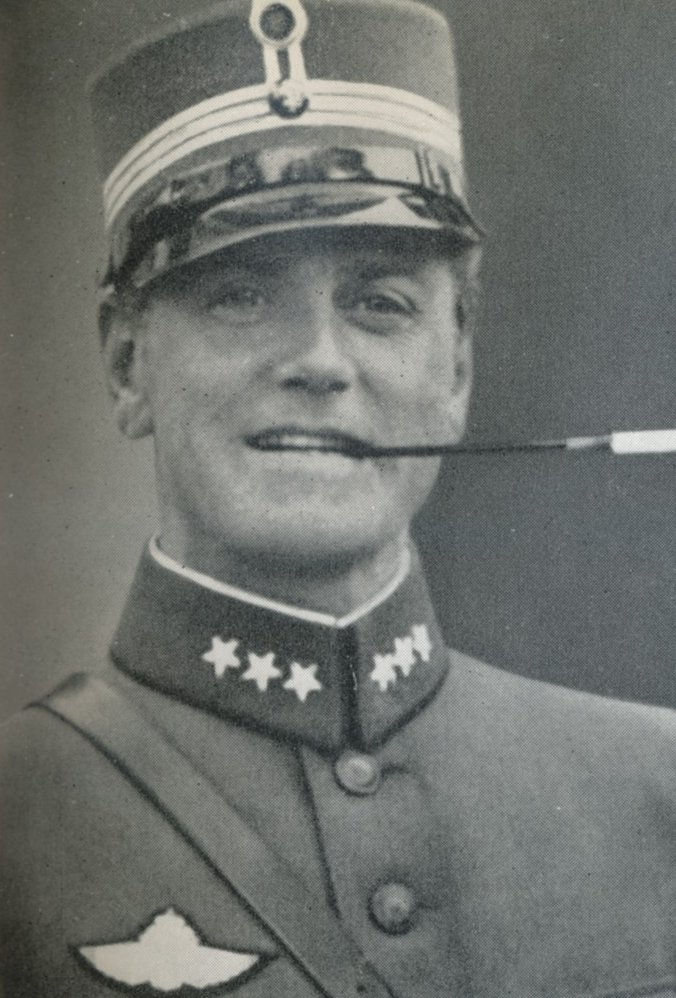
Film director Tancred Ibsen

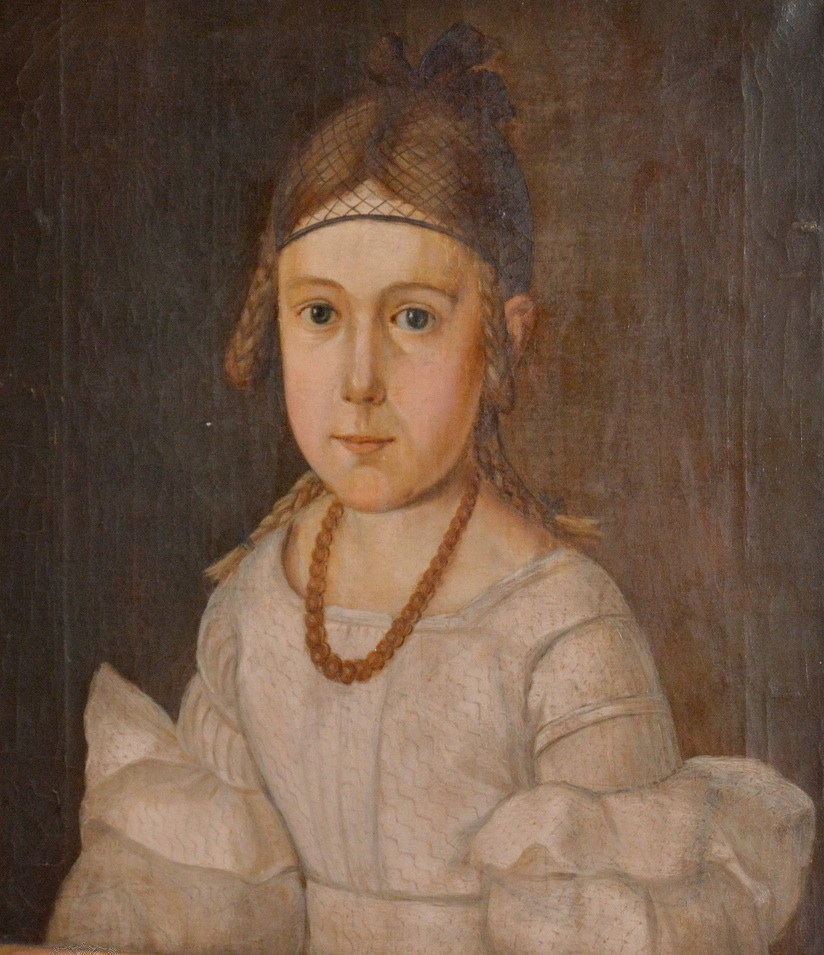
Hedvig Ibsen

Ibsen-Bjørnson-Paus family

Ole Paus; 1766-1855	Johanne Plesner; 1770-1847	Henrik Johan Ibsen; 1765-1797	Hedevig Christine Paus; 1763-1848	Johan Andreas Altenburg; 1763-1824
Henrik Johan Paus; 1799-1893	Christian Cornelius Paus; 1800-1879	Christopher Blom Paus; 1810-1898	Knud Ibsen; 1797-1877	Marichen Altenburg; 1799-1869	Hans Conrad Thoresen; 1802-1858	Magdalene Kragh; 1819-1903	Peder Bjørnson; 1798-1871
Johan Altenborg Paus; 1833-1894	Ole Paus; 1846-1931	Hedvig Ibsen; 1831-1920	Henrik Ibsen; 1828-1906	Suzannah Thoresen; 1836-1914	Karoline Reimers; 1835-1834	Bjørnstjerne Bjørnson; 1832-1910	Petter Elias Bjørnson f. 1838
Christopher de Paus; 1862-1943	Otto von Munthe; 1871-1945	Martha Marie Paus f. 1876	Christopher Blom Paus; 1878-1959	Thorleif Paus; 1881-1976	Carl Stousland; 1860-1941	Sigurd Ibsen; 1859-1930	Bergliot Bjørnson; 1869-1953	Bjørn Bjørnson; 1859-1942	Erling Bjørnson; 1868-1959	Eyolf Soot; 1859-1928	Inga Bjørnson; 1871-1952	Harald Stormoen; 1872-1937
Per Paus; 1910-1986	Ole Paus; 1910-2003	Lillebil Krohn; 1899-1989	Tancred Ibsen; 1893-1978	Irene Ibsen; 1901-1985	Eleonora Ibsen	Svend Borberg; 1888-1947	Botten Soot; 1895-1958	Guri Stormoen; 1901-1974
Cecilie Wilhelmsen f. 1943	Christopher Paus	Peder Paus f. 1945	Ole Paus f. 1947	Anne-Karine Strøm f. 1951	Tancred Ibsen Jr. 1921-2015	Joen Bille f. 1944	Bente Scavenius f. 1944	Svend von Düring; 1915-1969
Alexander Nix f. 1975	Olympia Paus f. 1976	Pontine Paus f. 1973	Tirill Mohn f. 1975	Marcus Paus f. 1979	Nora Ibsen f. 1951	Beate Bille f. 1976

- Rasmus Ibsen (1632–1703), a ship's captain from Stege, Denmark.
  - Peder Rasmussen Ibsen (died 1765), ship's captain and merchant, settled in Bergen where he became a burgher.
    - Henrik Ibsen (1726–1765), merchant in Skien, who married Wenche Dishington (1738–1780). After Ibsen's death, Wenche married parish priest Jacob von der Lippe (1732–1804)
      - Henrich Ibsen (1765–1797), ship's captain and merchant in Skien, who married Johanne Plesner (1770–1847). Henrich Ibsen died at sea in 1797, and Johanne married shipowner Ole Paus (1776–1855).
        - Knud Ibsen (1797–1877), merchant in Skien until his bankruptcy in 1835, who married Marichen Altenburg (1799–1869).
          - Johan Altenburg Ibsen (1826–1828)
          - Henrik Ibsen (1828–1906), playwright, who married Suzannah Thoresen (1836–1914)
            - Sigurd Ibsen (1859–1930), Prime Minister of Norway, who married Bergliot Bjørnson (1869–1953)
              - Tancred Ibsen (1893–1978), film director, who married Lillebil Krohn (1899–1989)
                - Tancred Ibsen Jr. (born 1921), Ambassador, married Ellinor (b. 1922)
                  - Nora Bergliot Ibsen (born 1951), theatre director, has issue
                  - Hedda Sophie Yvonne Ibsen (born 1956), has issue
              - Irene Ibsen (1901–1985), author, who married Josias Bille, had issue (including sons Anders Bille (1940–2011) (grandsons: Steen Oluf Bille and Bernt Ivar Bille) and Joen Bille (b. 1944) (granddaughter Beate Bille and grandson Johan Peder Bille)
              - Eleonora Ibsen (1906–1978)
          - Johan Andreas Altenburg Ibsen (born 1830), emigrated to the US in 1849. According to a letter he sent home on May 28, 1850, he settled in Oconomowoc, Wisconsin. Whereabouts since unknown, no known issue.
          - Hedvig Ibsen (1831–1920), married ship's captain Jacob Stousland, had issue (including son Carl Stousland)
          - Nicolai Alexander Ibsen (1834–1888), unmarried, physically disabled after his nanny dropped him to the floor, emigrated to the US in the late 1860s, lived in Estherville, Iowa.
          - Ole Paus Ibsen (1835–1917), married Anne Marthe Boyesen and Jenny Myhre, no issue.

=== Illegitimate descendants of Henrik Ibsen ===
As legally established, Henrik Ibsen also had an illegitimate son by the maid Else Sophie Birkedalen (1818–1892), named Hans Jacob Henriksen (Birkedalen) (1846–1916) (Henriksen is an active patronymic, meaning "son of Henrik [Ibsen]", as opposed to the "frozen" patronymic Ibsen). Hans Jacob Henriksen was a blacksmith and married three times, to Mathilde Andreasdatter (1851–1881), Trine Marie Gunvaldsen (died 1882) and Ida Gurine Olsdatter (died 1938). He was the father of eight children, including

- Jens Hansen Birkedalen (1876–1895), who was a ship's cook at the schooner "Josef af Lillesand", and who died at a hospital in Løgstør, Denmark
- Ole Hansen Birkedalen (1884–1884), died as an infant
- Isak Hansen Birkedalen (1885–1888), died as an infant
- Inga Hansine Hansdatter Birkedalen (1888–1904)
- Gunda Elise Hansdatter Birkedalen (1892–1896)
- Jenny Hansdatter Birkedalen (1895–1922)

Henrik Ibsen had no contact with his illegitimate son or grandchildren, who lived in relatively humble conditions. Most of the grandchildren died as children, and neither of them had descendants. Even if they were male line descendants of the Ibsen family, they were not entitled to use the family name Ibsen under the law of the time, were hence legally not considered members of the Ibsen family, and had no inheritance rights. Henrik Ibsen was however obliged to pay for the upbringing of his son until he was 14 years old. After receiving a letter from Grimstad's judge Johan Caspar Preus on the paternity of the child, Henrik Ibsen acknowledged the paternity in a reply letter of 7 December 1846, as "I unfortunately have had sexual intercourse with her."

== Literature ==
- Johan Kielland Bergwitz, Henrik Ibsen i sin avstamning: norsk eller fremmed?, Gyldendal Norsk Forlag, 1916
- Henrik Jæger, Henrik Ibsen, 1828-1888: A Critical Biography, A.C.McClurg, 1890 (1888)
- Høgvoll, Arvid; Bærland, Ruth (1996). Henrik Ibsen: herregårder, kammerherrer, godseiere og proprietærer : brokker av en slektshistorie, Nome Antikvariat
