= An Immortal Man =

An Immortal Man (En udødelig mann) is a miniseries on Henrik Ibsen's childhood and youth in three episodes, produced by the NRK in 2006 on the occasion of the 100th anniversary of Ibsen's death. It was directed by Berit Nesheim and written by Siri Senje, and first broadcast on NRK1 on 26, 27 and 28 December 2006.

The series' portrayal of Ibsen's childhood is based on older Ibsen biographies that have been strongly critiqued in newer Ibsen scholarship. Jørgen Haave's book Familien Ibsen [The Ibsen Family] has demonstrated that the portrayal of Ibsen's childhood and parents, as depicted in the miniseries, is misleading and contains numerous inaccuracies. For example the series depicts Knud Ibsen as an alcoholic and the family as poor, both of which are inaccurate.

== Actors ==
- Henrik Ibsen (child): Sigurd Arntzen
- Hedvig Ibsen: Gina Victoria Ulveie Lia
- Henrik Ibsen (teenager): Anders Baasmo Christiansen
- Knud Ibsen: Sven Nordin
- Marichen Ibsen: Kjersti Holmen
- Hedvig Ibsen (teenager): Birgitte Larsen
- Grandmother Johanne Paus: Lise Fjeldstad
- (Step) grandfather Ole Paus: Per Theodor Haugen
- Uncle Henrik Johan Paus: Eindride Eidsvold
- Uncle Christopher Blom Paus: Erland Bakker
- Cathrine Paus: Odille A. Heftye Blehr
- Hilde Paus: Anna Lena Hansen
- The Rat Wife (Aunt Ploug): Wenche Foss
- Else Sofie: Laila Goody
- Clara Ebbel: Kaia Varjord
- Reimann: Bjørn Sundquist
- Madam Reimann: Marika Enstad
- Miss Crawford: Stina Ekblad
- Christopher Due: Joachim Rafaelsen
- Ole Schulerud: Kim Sørensen
- Latin teacher: Svein Erik Brodal
- Lars Nielsen: Mads Ousdal
