= Hedevig Paus =

Norwegian businesswoman (1763 – 1848)

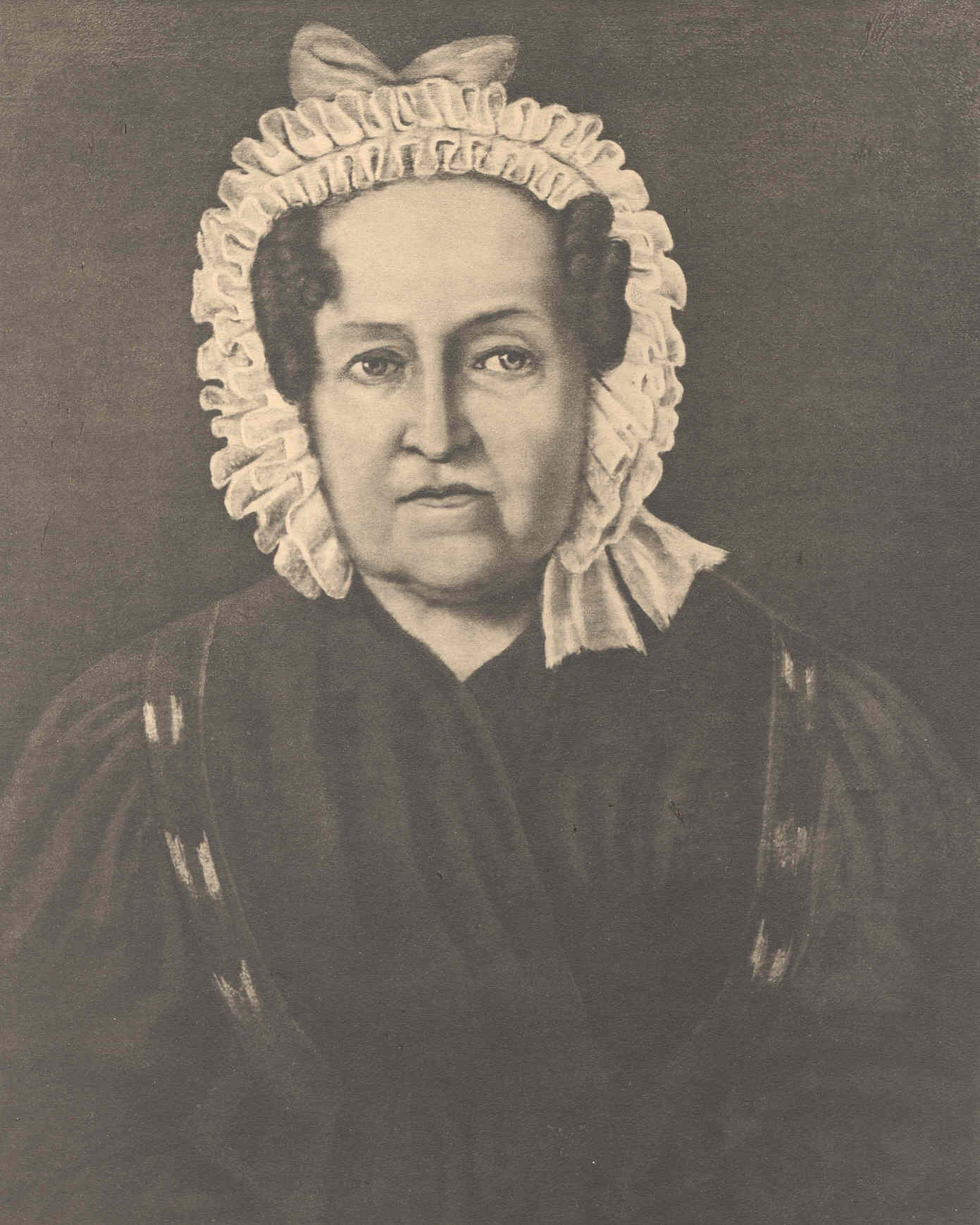
Hedevig Paus

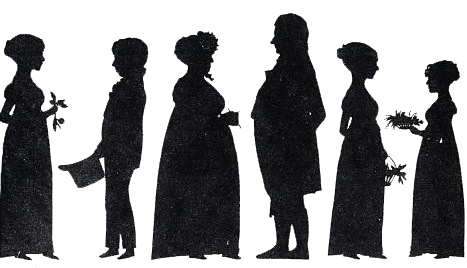
A silhouette (ca. 1820) of the Altenburg/Paus family in Altenburggården, with Hedevig Paus and her husband in the centre, their daughters to the right, and a nephew and niece who lived with them, Marichen Bomhoff and Henrik Johan Paus, to the left. The only known portrait of either of Ibsen's parents.

Hedevig Christine Paus (29 October 1763 – 7 March 1848) was a Norwegian businesswoman and the grandmother of the playwright Henrik Ibsen. Henrik Ibsen's parents, Knud and Marichen—Hedevig's daughter—grew up as close relatives, sometimes referred to as "near-siblings," and both belonged to the tightly intertwined Paus family at the Rising estate and in Altenburggården – that is, the extended family of the sibling pair Hedevig Paus and Ole Paus, who belonged to the merchant elite of Skien. Ibsen drew significant inspiration from his childhood environment and family, and named or modelled various characters after family members; the main character of "Hedvig" in his masterpiece The Wild Duck was named after her.

== Biography ==
She was born at Bjåland in Laurdal prestegjeld in 1763. A member of the regionally prominent Paus family of civil servants, she was the daughter of the forest inspector of Upper Telemark, Cornelius Paus, and Christine Falck. Cornelius's father and grandfather were both chief district judges of Upper Telemark. Hedevig was the sister of the ship's captain and shipowner Ole Paus, and of Martha Paus (1761–1786), who was married to the shipowner and timber merchant Hans Jensen Blom.

In 1794, she married the ship's captain Johan Andreas Altenburg, who early ceased sailing and settled down as a wealthy shipowner and merchant in Skien. At the beginning of the 1800s, the Altenburg family was among the wealthiest merchant families in the port city of Skien. Johan Andreas Altenburg "owned properties valued between twenty and thirty thousand, including a large mansion, a spirits distillery at Lundetangen, which was the second largest in the county, as well as a farm in the countryside at Århus and two ships engaged in the timber trade."

Her husband died in 1824, and she then took over his businesses. The following year, their daughter Marichen Altenburg married Knud Ibsen, who was the stepson of Hedevig's brother Ole Paus. Hedevig then transferred the assets to her daughter, and according to the laws of the time, they became the property of her son-in-law. The fortune enabled Knud Ibsen to establish himself as one of Skien's leading merchants in the late 1820s and early 1830s. One of her brother's sons, and Knud's half-brothers, Henrik Johan Paus, was also raised by Hedevig and Johan Andreas Altenburg. The families of Paus, Altenburg, and Ibsen were, therefore, very closely and intricately interwoven, and the marriage between Marichen and Knud has been described as "a perfect family arrangement." Hedevig Paus was the grandmother of Henrik Ibsen.

Henrik Ibsen named many literary characters after family members, and he gave his grandmother's name to the character "Hedvig (Ekdal)" in The Wild Duck. Ibsen also wrote that he had used his own family and childhood memories as the model for the Gynt family in Peer Gynt.
