= Plesner (Norwegian family) =

Norwegian family of Danish extraction

Plesner is a Norwegian family of Danish extraction, noted for its association with playwright Henrik Ibsen. Many descendants of the family have occupied prominent positions in Norwegian society.

== History ==
Johan Glüsing Plesner (1703–1735) from Kerteminde in Denmark migrated to Skien in Norway around 1720, where he became a merchant. He was a son of merchant Bendix Jens Plesner (died 1708) and Anna Dorthe Bager (died 1748) of Kerteminde, and was married to Karen Cathrine Hind, a daughter of Kerteminde's mayor (rådmand) Knud Pedersen Hind. Johan was the father of merchant Knud Plesner (1731–1790), married to Marie Roll (1741–1786). Henrik Ibsen cites the family as one of the patrician families of Skien.

== Descendants ==
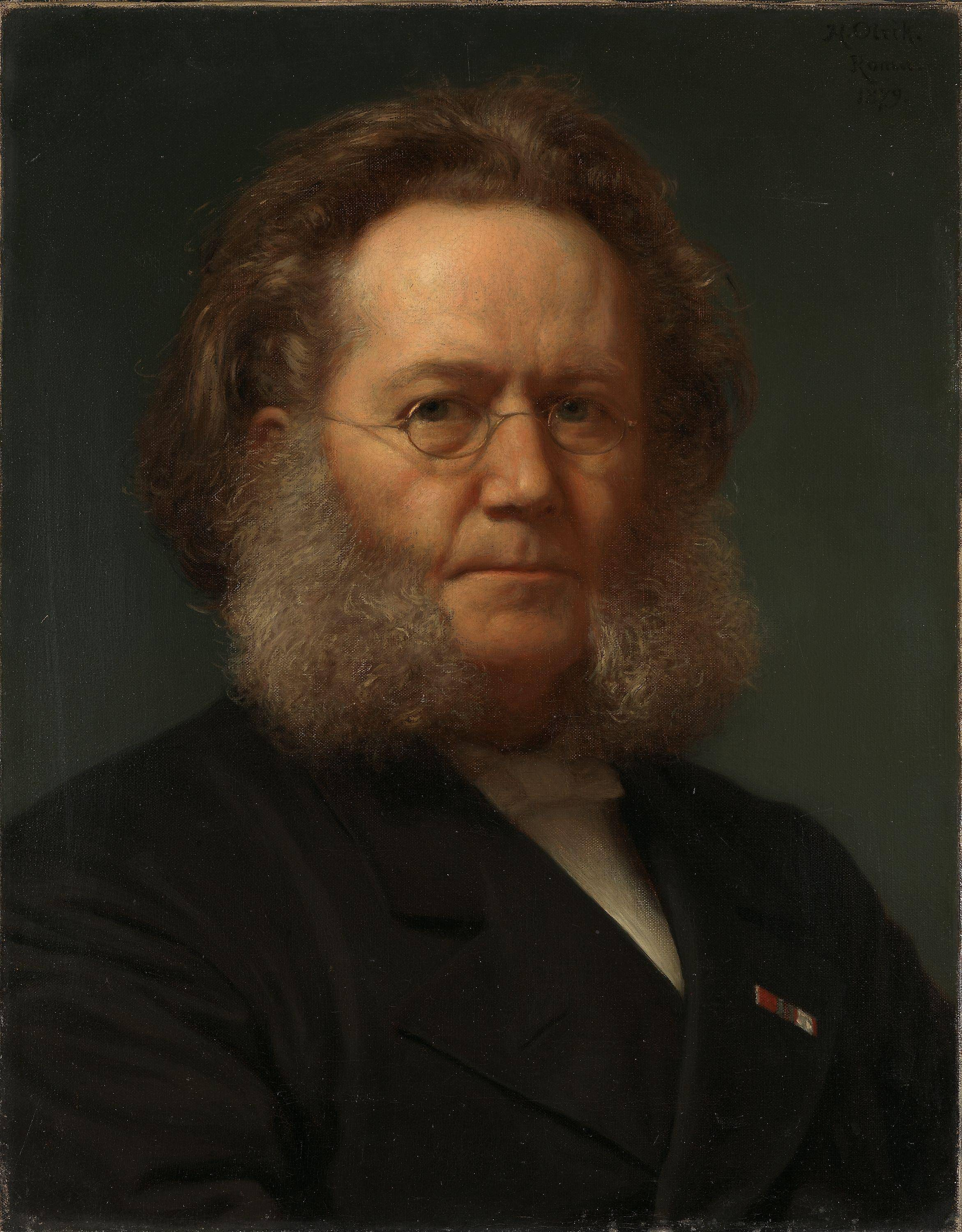
Henrik Ibsen

Knud Plesner had numerous descendants who occupied prominent positions in Norwegian society through his two daughters Maria Plesner and Johanne Plesner.

Maria Plesner (1768–1800) was married to Diderik von Cappelen. Their children were Petronelle von Cappelen (1794–1855), Diderik von Cappelen (1795–1866, married to Edel Severine Margrethe Henriette Løvenskiold), Marie Elisabeth Cappelen (1796–1834), Knud Cappelen (1797–1798), Inger Jørgine Cappelen (1799–1871) and Peder Cappelen (1800–1800). Maria Plesner was the grandmother of painter August Cappelen and land owner Severin Diderik Cappelen, and great-grandmother of chamberlain Diderik Cappelen.

Johanne Plesner (1770–1847) married ship's captain Henrich Ibsen (1765–1797) and in her second marriage shipowner Ole Paus (1766–1855), and her children were Knud Ibsen (1797–1877), Henrik Johan Paus (1799–1893), Christian Cornelius Paus (1800–1879), Maria Marthine Paus (born 1802), Christine Pauline Paus (born 1803), Nicolai Kall Paus (1804–1804), Jacob von der Lippe Paus (1806–1826), Mariane Nicoline Elisabeth Paus (born 1808), Christopher Blom Paus and Johanne Caroline Paus (born 1813). Her descendants include Henrik Ibsen, Sigurd Ibsen, Tancred Ibsen, Tancred Ibsen, Jr., Nora Ibsen, Irene Ibsen Bille, Joen Bille, Beate Bille, factory owner Ole Paus, Christopher Tostrup Paus, Ole Otto Paus, singer Ole Paus and Pontine Paus.
