= Stockmanngården =

Former house in Skien

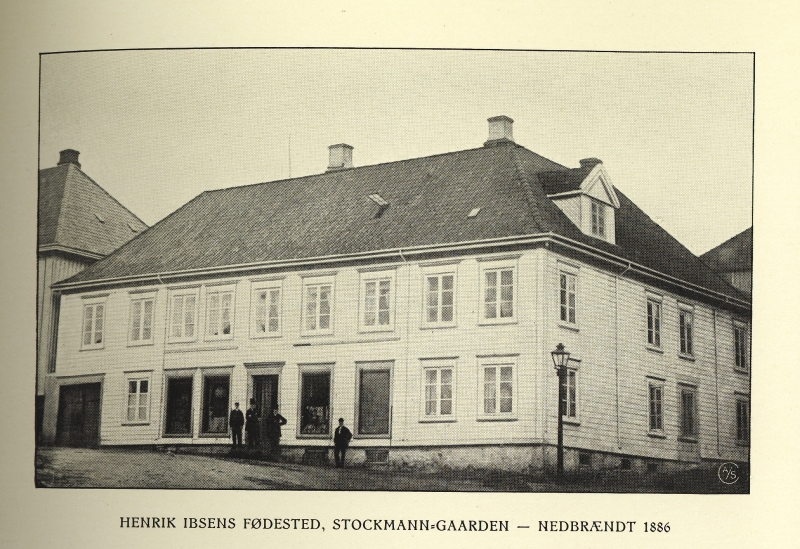
Stockmanngården

Stockmanngården (Stockmann House) was a large building in central Skien, known as the birthplace of the playwright Henrik Ibsen. It burned down during the great fire of 1886. It was located at the corner of Telemarksgaden and Prindsens Gade (now known as Henrik Ibsens gate). It was the city's most central townhouse, and had ten full rooms as well as loft, stables, barn and other outbuildings. It was named for the merchant Christian Stockmann.

In 1825 Knud Ibsen, aged 28, established himself as an independent timber and luxury goods merchant in Skien with his younger half-brother Christopher Blom Paus, aged 15, as his apprentice. In the 1825 census the two brothers lived in Stockmanngården with a maid named Marthe Isachsdatter, aged 30. The building's owner, the merchant's widow Rachel Stockmann, also lived in the building with her two daughters. In December 1825 Knud Ibsen married his stepfather's niece (his brother's first cousin) Marichen Altenburg, who then moved in with them. Henrik Ibsen was born in the building in 1828. On the ground floor the brothers Ibsen/Paus ran an assorted retail trade for wine, yarn and cotton goods, canvas, ivory chamber, mirrors, glass and brass objects, optical articles and foam pipes. In 1831 the Ibsen family moved to Marichen's childhood home, Altenburggården.
