= Cornelius Paus =

Cornelius Paus may refer to:

- Cornelius Povelsson Paus (1662–1723), Norwegian lawyer and government official
- Cornelius Paus (civil servant) (1726–1799), Norwegian civil servant

== See also ==
- Christian Cornelius Paus (1800–1879), Norwegian lawyer, civil servant and politician
