= Cornelius Paus (civil servant) =

Norwegian civil servant (1726 – 1799)

Cornelius Paus (October 29, 1726 – 1799) was a Norwegian civil servant. Around 1760 he was appointed by the King-in-Council as the forest inspector of Upper Telemark, one of Norway's most important forestry regions. As forest inspector he had the authority of a judge. He was Henrik Ibsen's great-grandfather. Towards the end of his life, he lived with his daughter Hedevig Paus and son-in-law Johan Andreas Altenburg in the Altenburg House in Skien, where he died. His life has been extensively studied in the context of Ibsen studies.

== Biography ==
Cornelius Paus belonged to the Paus family and was the son of the lawyer and former acting district judge Paul Corneliussen Paus and Martha Blom. Andreas Blom states that the parents had to obtain royal permission to marry, but Jon Nygaard found no documentation that this was the case. He was named after his grandfather, district judge Cornelius Povelsson Paus, who himself was named after his grandfather, timber trader in Skien Cornelius Jansen Trinepol. Cornelius Paus was the brother of Johanne Paus, married to the provost of Raabyggelaget Johan Christopher von Koss, and Cathrine (Medea Maj) Paus, married to justice counselor Anthon Jacob de Coucheron. He himself married Christine Olsdatter (Falch) (1732–1798) from a mining family in Kongsberg in 1761. At the marriage, he was referred to as "monsieur," a title used for persons of rank, and they were allowed to be married at home without prior betrothal. He was the father of Martha Paus, married to shipowner and timber trader Hans Jensen Blom; ship captain and shipowner Ole Paus, married to Johanne Plesner; and Hedevig Paus, married to shipowner and merchant Johan Andreas Altenburg. His daughter Hedevig was the mother of Marichen Altenburg and grandmother of Henrik Ibsen.

The specifics of his education are not known in detail, but the family had hired a tutor from 1737 to 1741. In 1745, at the age of nineteen, Cornelius Paus was employed as an assistant to the county governor of Bratsberg, Johan Frederik von Løvenhielm, who was described as a benefactor of his father. He probably stayed with Løvenhielm for several years, but exactly what he did until around 1760 is not known. In 1760, the royal office of forest inspector was reinstated, and about 30 such royal officials were appointed throughout Norway. Cornelius Paus then received the position of forest inspector of Upper Telemark, one of the economically most important forestry regions. As inspector, he was responsible for overseeing the forests in the district on behalf of the government and had the authority of a judge. He also took over the old district judge's farm Håtveit in Lårdal after his father. Hans Jacob Wille describes him as "a man of the greatest mechanical genius imaginable." At Håtveit, he built an advanced and experimental sawmill and mill for its time. In 1788, he sold Håtveit and moved with his wife to Kongsberg, where she had family. He likely retired as inspector at this time and lived thereafter as a pensioner. The sale of the family farm in Lårdal must, according to Nygaard, be seen in connection with all the children having established themselves as burghers in Skien by that time. After his wife's death in 1798, he moved in with his daughter Hedevig and son-in-law Johan Andreas Altenburg in Skien and died in the Altenburg House in 1799. His son-in-law's sister, the then 39-year-old "Aunt Ploug," moved in with them the same year that Cornelius Paus died. Cornelius Paus is described by B. Blom as "an exceptionally skilled woodcarver and a rarely kind and good man."
