= Johan Andreas Altenburg =

Norwegian merchant and shipowner (1763–1824)

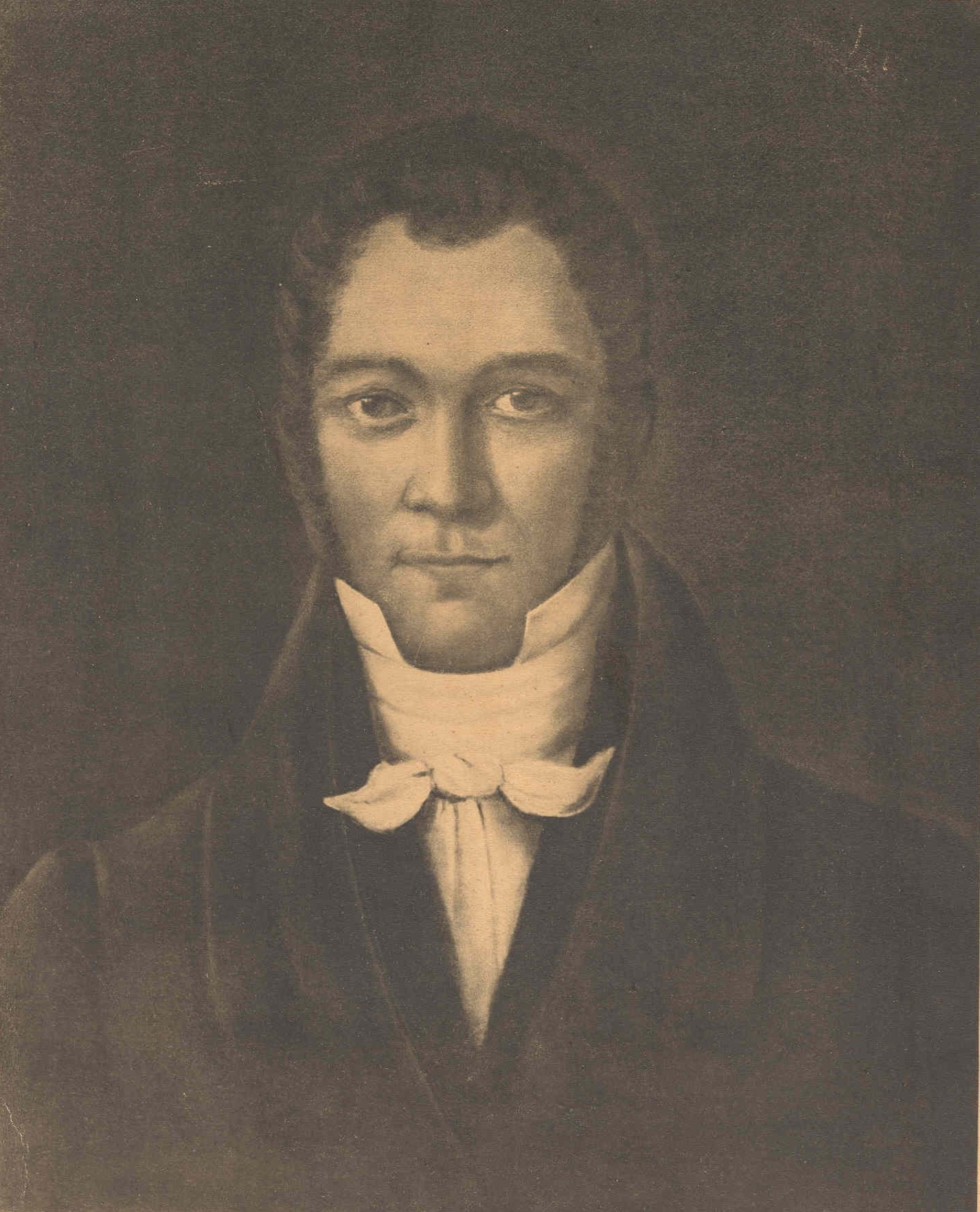
Johan Andreas Altenburg

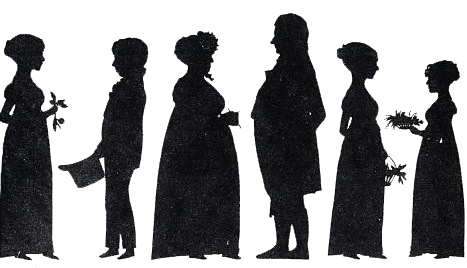
Johan Andreas Altenburg no. 3 from right, with wife Hedevig, daughter Marichen Altenburg and other relatives, late 1810s

Johan Andreas Altenburg (1763–1824) was a Norwegian merchant and shipowner. He belonged to the patriciate of the port town of Skien and was the maternal grandfather of playwright and theatre director Henrik Ibsen.

== Biography ==
Altenburg was born at Lille Ulefos, in Telemark, Norway. He was the son of sawmill manager Diderik Altenburg (1719–1766) and Marichen Johansdatter Barth (1737–1769). His parents died early. After the death of his father, his mother was married in 1767 to Engebreth Christopher Blom Bertelsen Bomhoff (1737–1800). After his mother's subsequent death, he and his siblings lived with their stepfather.

Johan Altenburg was originally a ship's captain, but stopped sailing at a relatively young age. Altenburg ran a lumber trade, owned several ships, a farm and a large brewery in the community of Bratsberg. He owned Altenburggården, a large manor in the center of Skien, where he lived with his family, and also owned one of Århusgårdene outside Skien, which the family used as a country house.

He married Hedevig Christine Paus (1763–1848), a sister of shipowner Ole Paus and Martha Paus (married Blom). His sister, Kristine Cathrine Ploug, lived with him and his family following the death of her husband in 1799. He was the father of Marichen Altenburg (1799–1869) and thus the maternal grandfather of playwright Henrik Ibsen. Following his death and his daughter's marriage to Knud Ibsen in 1825, his considerable fortune passed to his son-in-law, who however went almost bankrupt due to failed speculations in the mid-1830s. Almost the entire family fortune was lost by 1835. The Ibsen family had lived at the stately Altenburggården manor in central Skien, until Knud Ibsen's bankruptcy force them to move.

Altenburggården manor burned to the ground in the 1886 citywide fire which also reduced much of Skien to ruins after which the center of town was rebuilt.
