= Rising, Norway =

Old estate, area and geographical entity in Gjerpen, Norway

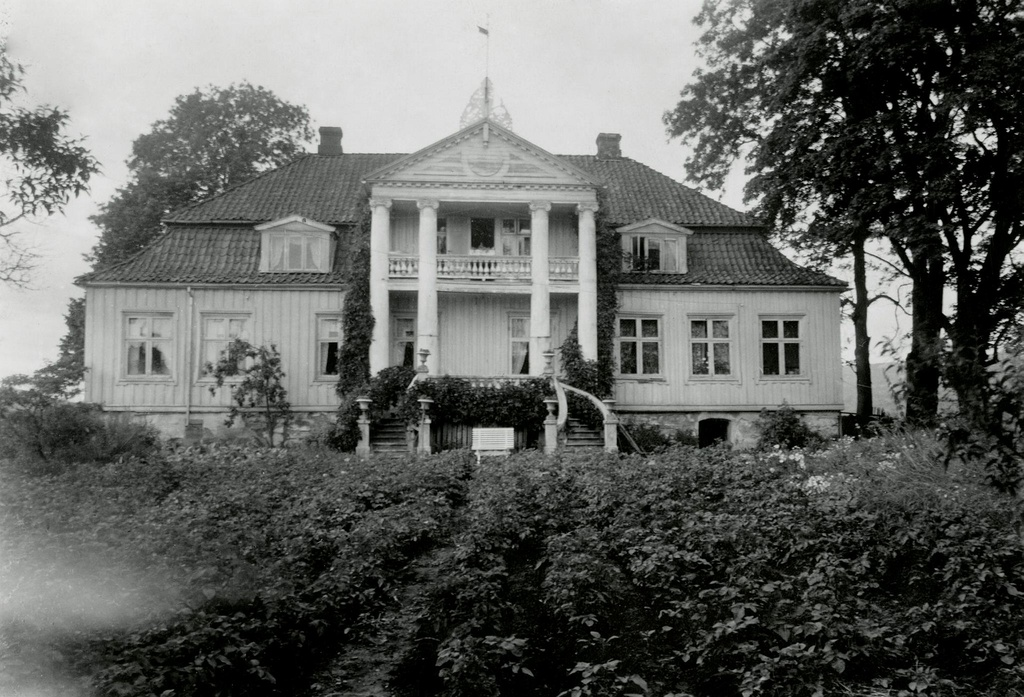
Southern Rising, the childhood home of Knud Ibsen

Rising is an old estate, area, and geographical entity (Norwegian: matrikkelgård) in Skien Municipality in Telemark county, Norway. The area is known for its association with Henrik Ibsen. It is located just outside of the city of Skien in an area that was historically part of the old Gjerpen Municipality (part of Skien Municipality since 1964).

== History ==
Rising was probably cleared in the early Iron Age (500 BC–550 AD) and there are finds from the Stone Age and Viking Age there. Already in the Viking Age the estate was divided into a southern and a northern farm. Rising borders on Grini and Venstøp in the north, on Gjerpen parsonage and Grini in the east, on Vattenberg and Skien city in the south, and on Mæla in the west. Rising is located near Gjerpen Church.

The Rising farms were owned by the church in the Middle Ages and later became part of the Gjerpen provost's estate. They were sold to Cort Adeler in 1668. The Rising farms eventually consisted of a number of farms with a varied history of ownership. The most famous of these, Southern Rising, was the childhood home of Henrik Ibsen's father, Knud Ibsen. Knud's stepfather Ole Paus bought Rising in 1799 after he had sold the Ibsen House in Skien's Løvestrædet, and lived there with his wife, Knud's mother, until her death in 1847. Alongside Altenburggården and Venstøp, Rising was an important part of Henrik Ibsen's childhood environment, as his grandparents' home, and Ibsen used the family from Rising and its family traditions as models for people and episodes in several dramas, including The Wild Duck, Peer Gynt, An Enemy of the People and Hedda Gabler, where the name Rising also appears in the form Rysing.
