= Jørgen von Ansbach =

German-Norwegian merchant and mayor (1510–1591)

Jørgen von Ansbach (c. 1510 – c. 1590) was a German-Norwegian timber merchant and mayor of Skien (southern part of Norway).

He immigrated from Germany to Skien around 1540. He came as a mining administrator at a time when King Christian III of Denmark tried without success to establish a mining industry in Bratsberg (now Telemark). He subsequently became a pioneer in the timber industry in the district as an owner of several sawmills and a major timber merchant. He organized efforts to make water flows from the Hjellevannet on the lower water basin in the Skien watercourse (Skiensvassdraget) to the Skien River (Skienselva) so that water could drive recovery saws. He established sawmills and the timber trade rose sharply in Skien. He was cited as mayor of Skien in 1568, 1570 and 1578.

His considerable fortune was largely derived from the number of properties he owned in the city and district. These properties were divided between his five daughters whose descendants dominated the commercial life in Skien into the 17th century as timber merchants and estate owners. Among his descendants were Anne Clausdatter (1659–1713) who owned Borgestad Manor and Christian Cornelius Paus (1800–1879) who was Governor of Bratsberg. Among his more notable descendants was the playwright Henrik Ibsen.

== Other sources ==
- Ivar Seierstad (1958) Skiens historie Bind I fra 1184 til ca 1814 (Skien: Erik St. Nilssens Forlag. page 129-130)
- Øystein Rian (1997) Bratsberg på 1600-tallet. Stat og samfunn i symbiose og konflikt (Oslo: Universitetsforl. page 109–110)
- S. H. Finne-Grønn (1910) "Jørgen v. Ansbach, Engel Jensen og slegten Klouman" in Norsk Personalhistorisk Tidsskrift Vol. 1 p. 357
