= Hedvig Ibsen =

Norwegian writer and Henrik Ibsen's sister (1831–1920)

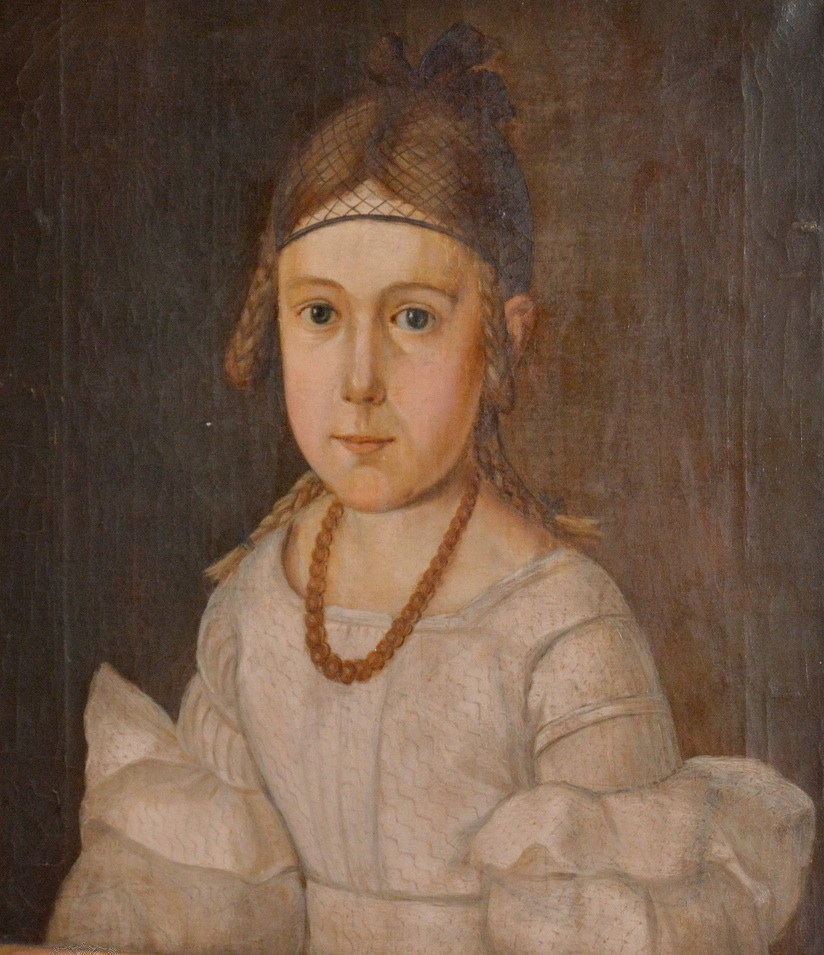
Hedvig, painted at age eight by Christian Grandjean

Hedvig Cathrine Ibsen (married name Hedvig Stousland; born 15 November 1831 in Skien – died 15 June 1920 in Skien) was the sister of playwright Henrik Ibsen. She was the sister with whom Ibsen was particularly close during their childhood. She was the daughter of Knud Ibsen and Marichen Altenburg, in a wealthy family whose fortunes were eventually ruined by Ibsen's bankruptcy.

== Influence on Henrik Ibsen ==
Hedvig was named for her maternal grandmother, Hedevig Paus. The character Hedvig in Ibsen's The Wild Duck is widely believed to be named for her and/or her grandmother.

== Personal life ==
Ibsen married ship's captain Jacob Stousland. Their son, merchant and politician Carl Stousland (1860–1941), became a member of parliament for Skien and its mayor.
