= Kristine Cathrine Ploug =

Kristine Cathrine Ploug (née Altenburg) (1760–1837), known as Aunt Ploug (Faster Ploug in Norwegian), was a relative of playwright Henrik Ibsen, cited as the influence of some of the characters in his plays, such as The Rat-Wife in Little Eyolf. She was a sister of Johan Andreas Altenburg, Ibsen's maternal grandfather, and as such the aunt of Marichen Altenburg and great-aunt of Henrik Ibsen. She lived with her brother from around 1799, following the death of her husband, and after Johan Andreas Altenburg's death, she lived with the Ibsen family. She died at Venstøp in 1837.

Ibsen scholar Oskar Mosfjeld describes her as an eccentric. The Ibsen children were said to be afraid of her due to her odd behaviour. Today, it is considered likely that she suffered from dementia due to advanced age.

She was portrayed by Cecilie Graasvold in the play Rotte på loftet, and by Wenche Foss in the NRK television miniseries En udødelig mann.

Kristine Cathrine Altenburg was baptized on 17 September 1760 in Holla, and her parents were Diderik Altenburg (1719–1766) and Marichen Johansdatter Barth (1737–1769). Diderik Altenburg was the manager of a sawmill. Both her parents died early, and her mother was married for a second time in 1767 to (Fredrich) Engebreth Christopher Blom Bertelsen Bomhoff.
