= Nora Ibsen =

Norwegian theatrical producer

Nora Bergliot Ibsen (born 1951) is a Norwegian theatrical producer, noted for being the producer of the 2006 Ibsen Year, Norway's major anniversary of playwright Henrik Ibsen's death 100 years earlier, including high profile celebrations in multiple countries. The Ibsen Year was one of the Norwegian government's major cultural undertakings in 2006, aimed at increasing appreciation of Henrik Ibsen and Norwegian culture internationally. The Ibsen Year comprised 8213 separate cultural events, and 83 countries took part in the commemoration.

== Family ==
She is the great-great-granddaughter of both Henrik Ibsen and Bjørnstjerne Bjørnson, the 1903 Nobel Prize in Literature laureate. She is the daughter of diplomat Tancred Ibsen, Jr., the granddaughter of pioneer film director Tancred Ibsen and dancer and actress Lillebil Ibsen, and the great-granddaughter of Prime Minister Sigurd Ibsen. She is named for the character Nora in Ibsen's play A Doll's House as well as for her great-grandmother Bergliot Ibsen. She is, together with her sister Hedda Ibsen, one of only two surviving male line members of the Ibsen family.

== Work ==
Nora Ibsen was headhunted by Bentein Baardson as the producer of the 2006 Ibsen Year. Queen Sonja was the Ibsen Year's high protector.

The opening ceremony of the International Ibsen Year in Oslo, produced by Nora Ibsen and attended by the royal family and distinguished guests, presented Hedda Gabler as a Chinese opera, Ghosts as a ballet, as well as a rap version of Peer Gynt. The ceremony was also broadcast on NRK1. Nora Ibsen also produced the International Gala performance of Peer Gynt at the Great Pyramid of Giza, which was held under the auspices of Egypt's First Lady Suzanne Mubarak and also attended by Queen Sonja of Norway.

Nora Ibsen was also the producer of the 2008 Wergeland Year commemorating Henrik Wergeland, again in collaboration with Bentein Baardson.

She has also worked as a producer for the official celebration of King Harald V's and Queen Sonja's 70th birthdays.
