= Henrik Johan Paus =

Norwegian jurist and civil servant

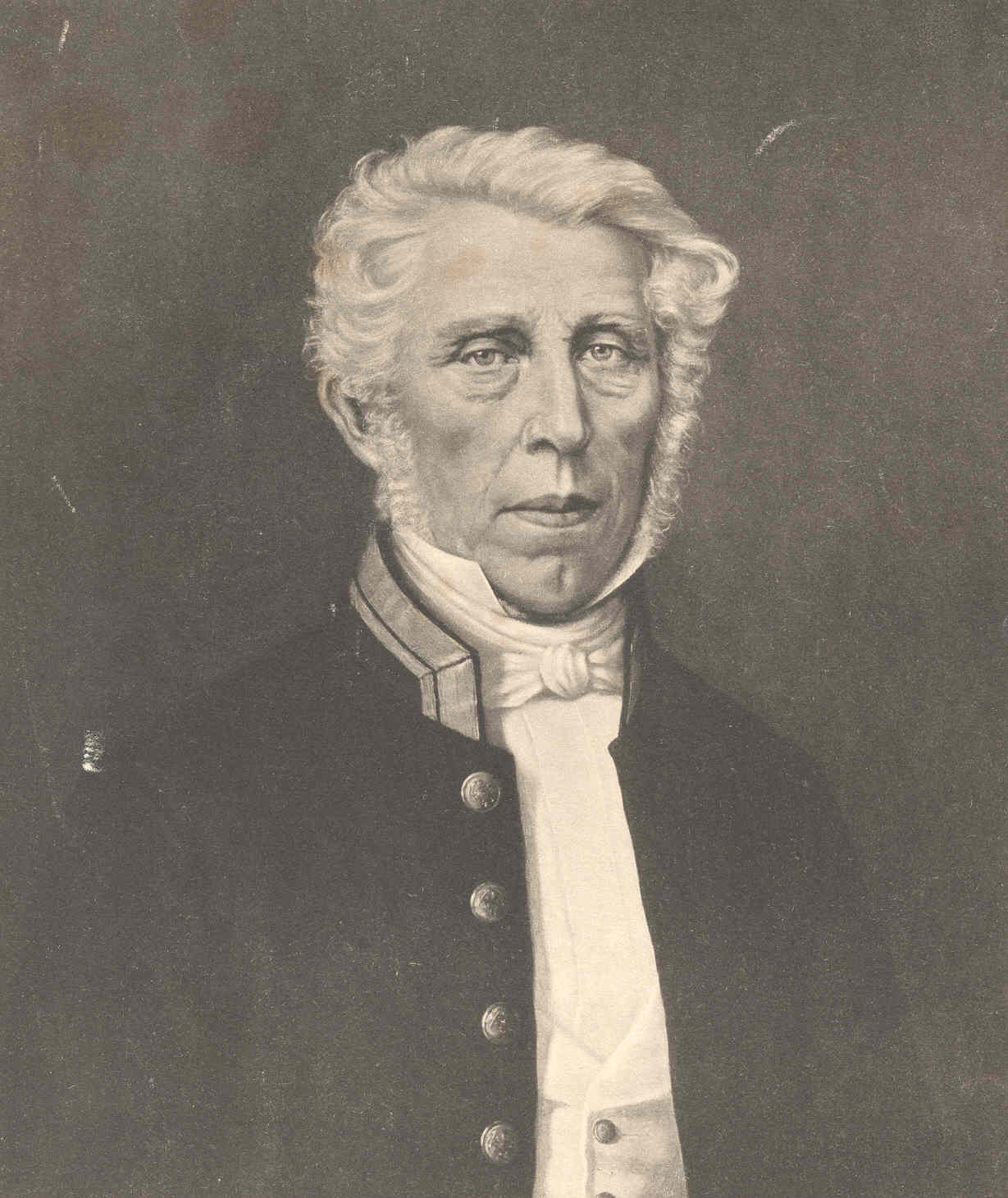
Henrik Johan Paus

Henrik Johan Paus (3 October 1799 – 21 July 1893) was a Norwegian lawyer, government official and uncle of playwright Henrik Ibsen. He was acting bailiff of Lower Telemark and Bamble in 1818, a civil servant with the Ministry of Finance 1819–1823, deputy governor of Hedemarken 1823–1826, sheriff of Hof 1826–1830, attorney-at-law and acting judge in Hedemarken 1830–1843, bailiff of Østerdalen 1843–1858 and bailiff of Øvre Romerike 1858–1860.

== Early life ==
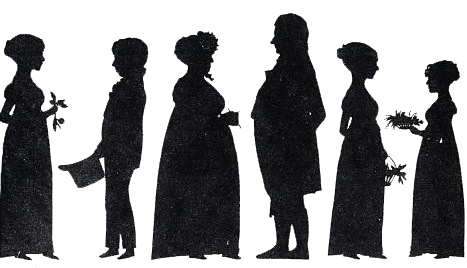
A silhouette (ca. 1820) of the Altenburg/Paus family in Altenburggården, with Henrik Johan Paus as no. 2 from left; his cousin Marichen Altenburg (Henrik Ibsen's mother) to the far right. The silhouette was owned by his grandson Christopher Tostrup Paus and is the only existing portrait of either of Ibsen's parents.

Henrik Johan Paus, usually known as Henrik, was born in Skien as the son of captain Ole Paus and Johanne Plesner. He was named for his mother's deceased first husband Henrich Johan Ibsen, and shared his name with his nephew, the playwright. He was both the half-brother of Knud Ibsen and the first cousin of Marichen Altenburg, Henrik Ibsen's parents, and from the age of five he grew up in Altenburggården with his cousin. During his childhood he was also close to his half-brother.

== Career ==
He received private schooling in Skien and attended the burgher school there. In preparation for his university studies he was employed at the office of the bailiff of Lower Telemark and Bamble Bendix Plesner, his mother's cousin, in 1816. At the age of only 18 he became acting bailiff during the latter's extended absence. In 1819 he enrolled at the law faculty at the Royal Frederick University, where he graduated in 1822. He worked for the finance ministers Herman Wedel-Jarlsberg og Jonas Collett in the Ministry of Finance until 1823, when he was appointed deputy governor of Hedemarken. He owned the large estate Østerhaug in Elverum for 25 years. Upon his retirement he returned to Skien.

== Personal life ==
He was married to Sophie Lintrup, daughter of the Danish-born doctor Christian Lintrup. Among their sons were the doctor Ole Paus (1830–1897), Major Johan Altenborg Paus (1833–1894), the textile merchant in Manchester Christopher Paus (1843–1919) and the railroad engineer Tollef Lintrup Paus (f. 1843). Two of his daughters, Sofie Henriette Paus (1832–1862) and Nina Paus (1839–1866), both successively married shipowner and estate owner in Skien Hans Hoell, while his daughter Louise Paus (1835–1908) married the mayor of Trondheim Christian Hulbert Hielm.

He was the grandfather of Christopher Tostrup Paus, who was heir to the timber company Tostrup & Mathiesen and who was conferred the title of count by Pope Pius XI, as well as to British diplomat Christopher Lintrup Paus and road engineer Hans Wangensten Paus. He was the great-grandfather of Ambassador Thorleif Lintrup Paus.

Henrik Johan Paus is interred at Lie cemetery. In the television series An Immortal Man from 2006, he was portrayed by Eindride Eidsvold.
