= Christopher Blom Paus =

Norwegian businessman (1810–1898)

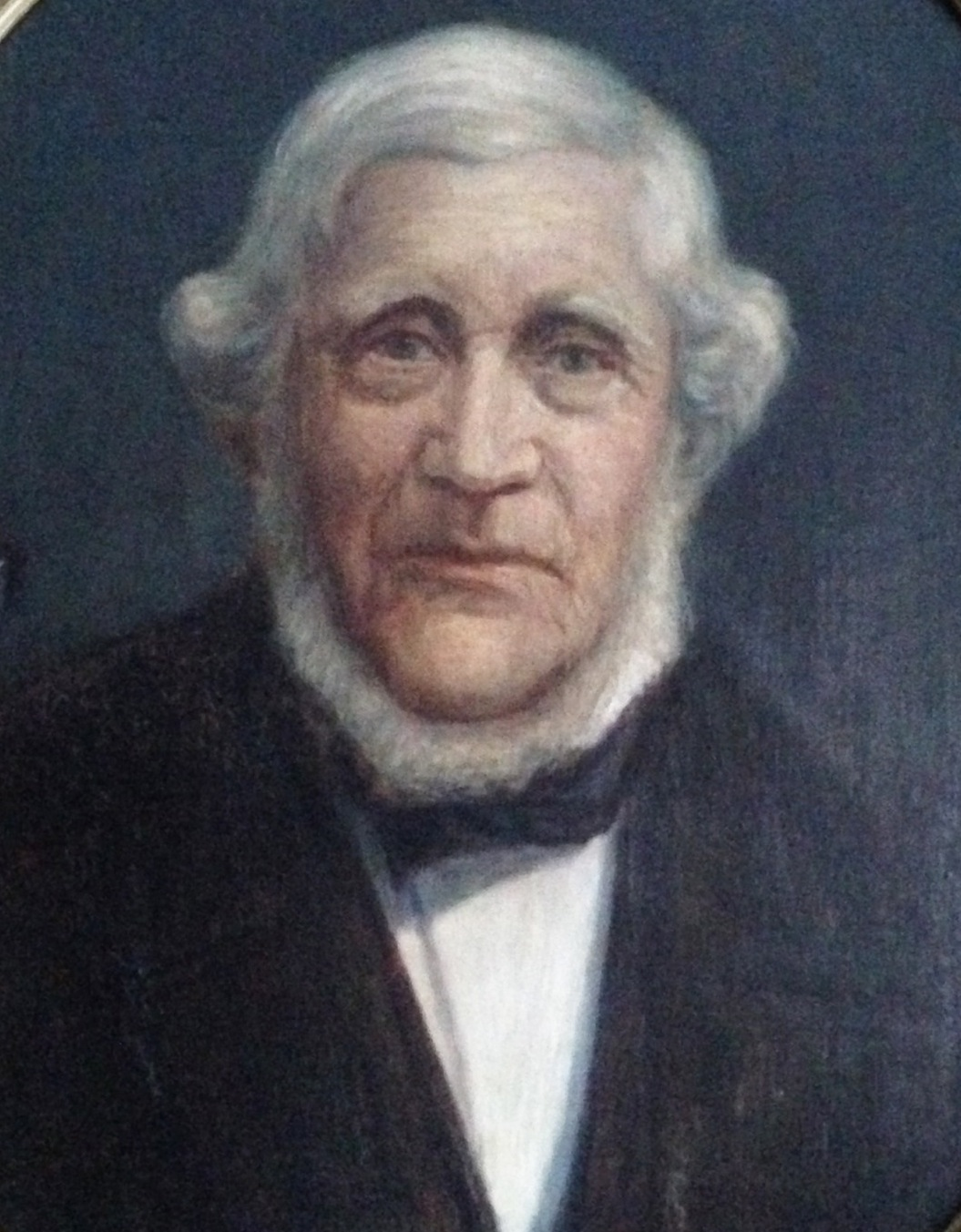
Christopher Blom Paus

Christopher Blom Paus (8 October 1810 – 28 October 1898) was a Norwegian shipowner, merchant and banker.

== Biography ==
Paus was born on the Rising Nordre estate in Gjerpen, Norway. Born into the patriciate of the port town of Skien, he was the son of shipowner Ole Paus and Johanne Plesner (formerly married Ibsen). He was the uncle of playwright Henrik Ibsen, as he was both the half brother of Ibsen's father Knud Ibsen and the first cousin of Ibsen's mother Marichen Altenburg. He was the brother of judge, Bratsberg governor and Member of Parliament Christian Cornelius Paus and lawyer Henrik Johan Paus. Christopher Blom Paus owned the house at Snipetorp where the Ibsen family lived from the time of Henrik Ibsen's confirmation in 1843 to 1865.

Paus started as a wholesaler and eventually concentrated mainly on the shipping business. He entered his business career as a clerk in his brother's trading shop. Paus worked from the late 1820s until 1836 for merchant Christopher Hansen Blom in the Blom trading house. In the 1860s he invested heavily in shipping and entered the emigrant trade with runs between Trondheim, Quebec and Newcastle. He later became one of Skien's leading shipowners and businessmen. He was a city councilor in Skien for several years and held other public offices. In addition to being a shipowner, he was administrative director of the savings bank Skiens Sparebank from 1874 to 1887.

== Personal life ==
In 1845 Paus married Erasmine Ernst (1817–1914). He was the father of factory owner Ole Paus. His grandson Herman Paus married Countess Tatyana Tolstoy, a granddaughter of Leo Tolstoy. Their descendants own Herresta and other Swedish estates. He was also the great-grandfather of General Ole Paus and the great-great-grandfather of singer Ole Paus.

Christopher Blom Paus died in Oslo and was buried at the Cemetery of Our Saviour.

== Other sources ==
- Arvid Høgvoll; Ruth Bærland (1996) Henrik Ibsen: Herregårder, kammerherrer, godseiere og proprietærer: brokker av en slektshistorie (Nome antikvariat) ISBN 8291739005
