= Altenburg House =

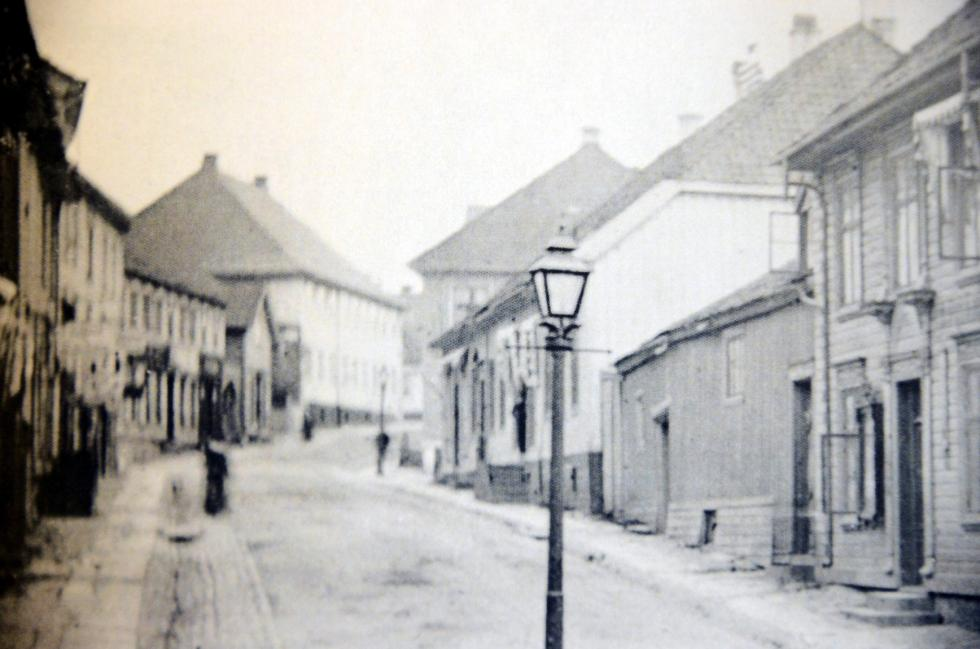
The roof and one of the windows of Altenburggården can be seen in the middle of the picture. Altenburggården was Marichen Altenburg's childhood home, and Henrik Ibsen lived there aged 3–8

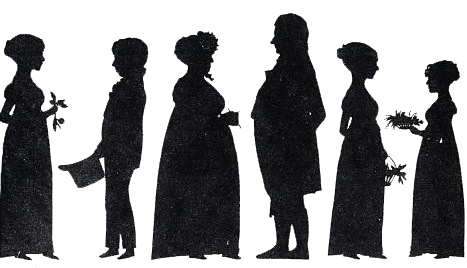
A silhouette (ca. 1820) of the family in Altenburggården, including Marichen Altenburg (far right) and her parents (centre). It is the only existing portrait of either of Ibsen's parents.

Altenburg House (Norwegian: Altenburggården) was a large townhouse in central Skien, Norway, known as the childhood home of the playwright Henrik Ibsen and his mother Marichen Altenburg. It burned down during the great fire of 1886. It was located at the address Skistredet 20.

== History ==
The house is named for the wealthy Skien merchant Johan Andreas Altenburg (1763–1824), Henrik Ibsen's maternal grandfather, who was most likely its first owner. He was a shipowner, timber merchant and owned a liquor distillery at Lundetangen. Altenburggården had no garden, but the Altenburg family owned a farm outside the city, Århus. Johan Andreas Altenburg was married to Hedevig Christine Paus (1763–1848), and after her husband's death she became the owner of the house in 1824. Their daughter Marichen Altenburg (1799–1869)—Henrik Ibsen's mother—grew up in Altenburggården. Hedevig's father Cornelius Paus (civil servant) moved into the house in the late 18th century and died there in 1799. In the same year, Johan Andreas Altenburg's sister Kristine Cathrine Ploug (née Altenburg), called «aunt Ploug» in the Altenburg and later Ibsen family, moved in with them. Marichen's maternal first cousin Henrik Johan Paus (1799–1893)—who was also the half-brother of Marichen's later husband Knud Ibsen—lived in Altenburggården as a foster child with his uncle and aunt from the age of five; Marichen's paternal cousin Marichen Bomboff (b. 1806) also lived in the home.

Hedevig Altenburg transferred the building to her son-in-law Knud Ibsen in 1830, and the Ibsen family moved in during 1831. Henrik Ibsen lived there from 1831 until 1836. In 1835 Knud Ibsen sold Altenburggården to the merchant Teleph Stub Plesner (1811–1852), and the Ibsen family moved to their country house Venstøp the following year.
