= Norwegian patriciate =

Norwegian social class from the 17th century

The Norwegian patriciate (in Norwegian borgerskap or patrisiat) was a social class in Norway from the 17th century until the modern age; it is typically considered to have ended sometime during the 19th or early 20th century as a distinct class. Jørgen Haave defines the Norwegian patriciate as a broad collective term for the civil servants (embetsmenn) and the burghers in the cities who were often merchants or ship's captains, i.e. the non-noble upper class. Thus it corresponds to term patriciate in its modern, broad generic sense in English. The patricians did not constitute a legally defined class as such, although its constituent groups, the civil servants and the burghers held various legal privileges, with the clergy de jure forming one of the two privileged estates of the realm until 1814.

== Terminology ==
In Norwegian the term borgerskap in modern usage is usually taken to mean both members of the bourgeoisie in its oldest sense, that is to say the burghers in the cities, and the class comprising the clergy and the civil servants, also known as the "aristocracy of officials" and by other names such as "the thousand academic families," as it was called by Jens Arup Seip with reference to the 19th century. The Norwegian term borgerskap thus largely corresponds to the English term patriciate in its modern, broad, generic sense, which vaguely refers to prominent families which did not belong to the nobility, typically members of the bourgeoisie and elite professions, and usually before the 20th century.

In Norwegian, the native term patrisiat (patriciat in older spelling) was used at least from the 19th century, based on a Danish and continental model. In Denmark the term patriciat denotes both the non-noble bourgeoisie and the non-noble class of higher civil servants, lawyers and members of other elite professions, especially before around 1900, as seen e.g. in the series Danske Patriciske Slægter (later Patriciske Slægter and Danske patricierslægter), which was published in six volumes between 1891 and 1979. In Denmark usage of the term patrician is typically restricted to families that belonged to this class no later than around 1800.

Henrik Ibsen used the term patriciate to describe his own family background, and the term has recently been used in scholarship exploring Ibsen's family and childhood milieu, and by extension the elite of the entire county of Telemark, e.g. by Jon Nygaard and Jørgen Haave, resulting in renewed interest in the patricians as a social group. In a Norwegian context, Jørgen Haave defines the patriciate as a broad collective term for the civil servants (embetsmenn) and the burghers in the cities who were often merchants or ship's captains, i.e. the non-noble upper class.

While patriciate in itself is a quite broad term and often defined in terms of culture and values, the term mercantile patriciate (handelspatrisiat) is sometimes used with reference to those families that acquired significant fortunes through trade.

== History ==
From the 17th century, a new bourgeois class emerged in Denmark–Norway. Whereas Danish–Norwegian society had previously been broadly divided into the nobility, the clergy and the farmers, the new bourgeoisie, while not noble, was clearly distinct from the farmer class. From the same period, the King also increasingly appointed non-nobles to state offices, and thus the bourgeoisie, typically consisting of merchants and ship's captains, and the civil servants, in many ways constituted a common social class and often intermarried. This class is often referred to as patricians in Denmark and Norway. Norway was different from Denmark due to the lack of a substantial Norwegian nobility, and therefore the class of non-noble patricians came to occupy a more prominent position in that country than in Denmark.

Jørgen Haave highlights the fact that many patrician families were of foreign, usually Danish or North German, origin, and that they maintained a strong separate identity.

Some elite mercantile patrician families in Norway, especially in the cities of Eastern Norway, acquired great fortunes through timber trade and shipping and some became major land owners. However the majority of patrician families, while affluent compared to ordinary people, were not exceedingly wealthy, and what made them stand out was more than anything their shared elite culture, social status and education. Together with the higher civil servants and clergy, but below the nobility, burghers such as merchants and ship's captains constituted the leading non-noble class in the kingdom in an era that lasted until some years after the Napoleonic Wars. A small number of patrician families were themselves, per purchase, raised to the Dano-Norwegian nobility in the 18th and 19th centuries; these included the Løvenskiold, Anker and Treschow families in 1739, 1778 and 1812, respectively.

Following the Napoleonic Wars, many of the patrician merchants struggled financially, and a new mercantile class emerged from the 1830s–1840s. By contrast, Norway during the 19th century became known as a "Civil Servant State," reflecting the role of the civil servants as "the most enduring, consistent and visible elite."

The clergy are often considered as part of the civil servant group and thus the patriciate in its broad, modern, sociological sense, although the clergy de jure formed one of the two privileged estates of the realm until 1814, even though the estates had lost their political importance after 1660.

== By region ==
The patriciate is often referred to by city or region, for example as the Christiania Patriciate, the Skien Patriciate and so forth. These were usually relatively small circles of related families which played a dominant role in the cities or regions.

=== Telemark ===
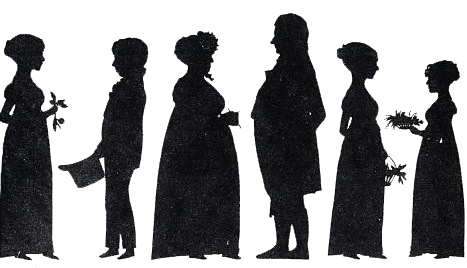
Henrik Ibsen used the term patriciate to describe his own family; here are his mother, grandparents and other relatives

In Telemark, the patricians from the early 17th century consisted of two intertwined main groups, the burghers in the Skien area and the civil servants in Upper Telemark which formed a close-knit "aristocracy of officials;" the two groups often intermarried. The most prominent members of the old elite in the Skien area were descended from Jørgen von Ansbach, who became a major sawmill owner and timber merchant in the 16th century. The patricians of Telemark formed a distinct social group until the 19th century; a letter Henrik Ibsen wrote to Georg Brandes in 1882 has often been quoted in this respect; in it Ibsen named "just about all the patrician families" in the area during his childhood, and mentioned the families Paus, Plesner, von der Lippe, Cappelen and Blom. Jon Nygaard argues that "the most prominent patrician families in Upper Telemark were Blom, Paus and Ørn," and notes that while the burgher class in Skien was relatively open to new men, the "aristocracy of officials" in Upper Telemark was a more closed group. Furthermore, the Aall and Løvenskiold families became part of the Telemark patriciate in the 18th century and acquired significant fortunes, partly through intermarriage with the older elite in Telemark. The patriciate of Telemark between the 17th and the 19th century has been extensively covered in historical scholarship, particularly in the context of Ibsen studies.

=== Christiania/Oslo ===
In Christiania, the families Collett and Anker were among the prominent families of the mercantile patriciate from the late 17th century.

=== Other ===
- Mecklenburg
- Tanche/Tank

== See also ==
- Norwegian nobility
- Aristocracy of officials
- Patrician (post-Roman Europe)
- Bildungsbürgertum
- Habitus (sociology)
- Symbolic capital
