= The Wild Duck =

1884 play by Henrik Ibsen

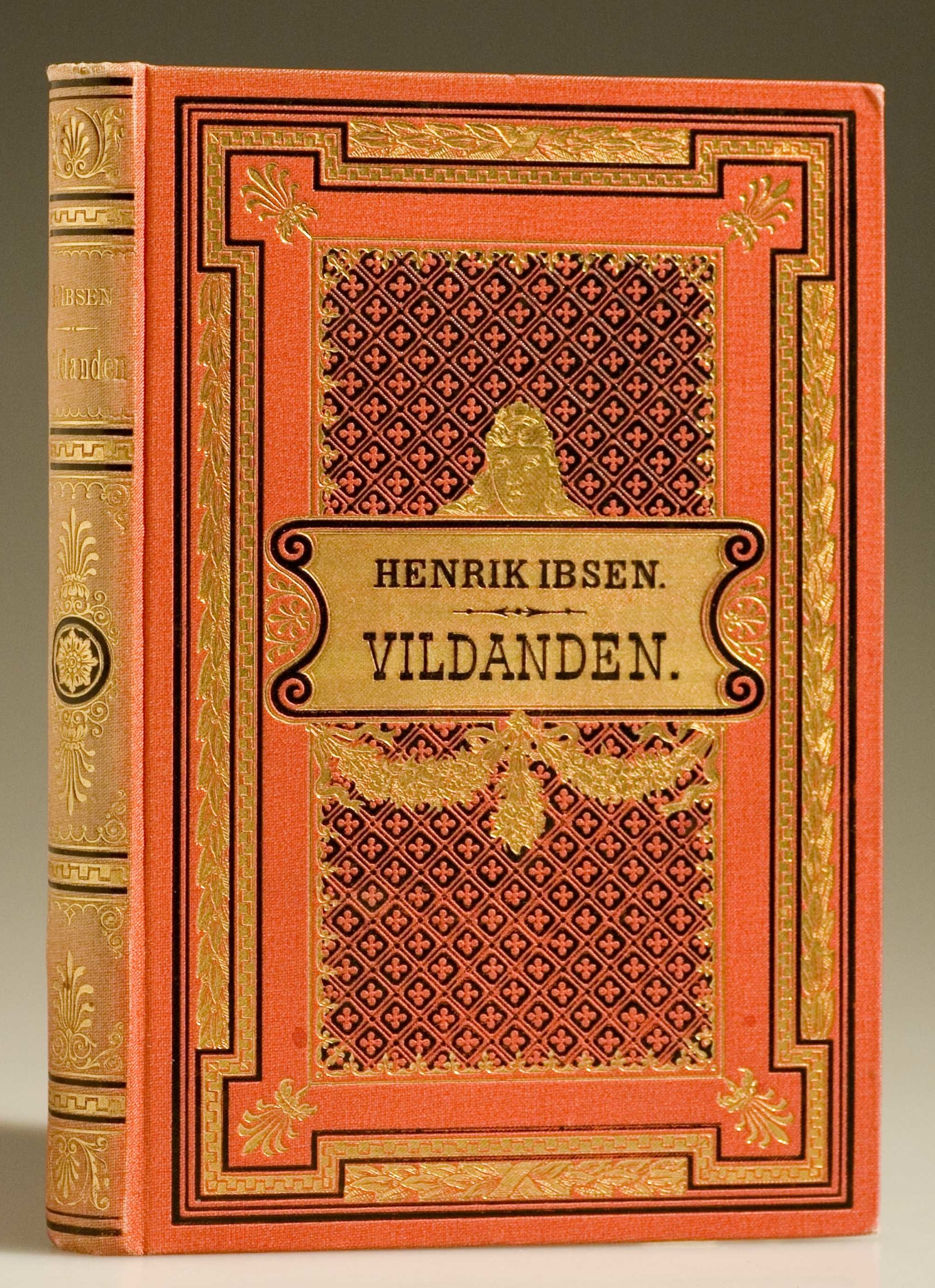
- The Wild Duck, published by Gyldendal in 1884
- Original language: Norwegian
- Written by: Henrik Ibsen
- Characters: Håkon Werle; Gregers Werle; Old Ekdal; Hjalmar Ekdal; Gina Ekdal; Hedvig Ekdal; Mrs. Sørby; Relling; Molvik; Pettersen; Jensen; Mr. Balle; Mr. Flor
- Genre: Drama
- Setting: The 1880s. Werle's house and later Hjalmar Ekdal's studio in Christiania, Norway

Premiere
- Date: 9 January 1885
- Place: Den Nationale Scene, Bergen, Norway

The Wild Duck (Norwegian: Vildanden) is an 1884 play by the Norwegian playwright Henrik Ibsen. It focuses on the Ekdal family, whose fragile peace is shattered by Gregers Werle, an idealist who insists on exposing hidden truths, leading to tragic consequences. The play was written in a realistic style, but literary scholars have pointed out the play's kinship with symbolism. It blends themes such as deception, betrayal, and the disillusionment of modern life with moments of comedy and satire, and is considered the first modern masterpiece in the genre of tragicomedy. According to Ibsen scholar and translator James McFarlane, The Wild Duck and Rosmersholm are "often to be observed in the critics' estimates vying with each other as rivals for the top place among Ibsen's works".

Themes of visibility and recognition permeate the narrative, featuring characters struggling to be seen while metaphorically and literally blind to each other's true selves, symbolized through motifs such as blindness, photography, and the wounded wild duck. Like other Ibsen plays, it is rich with references to Ibsen's family; "Old Ekdal" is a literary portrait of the playwright's father Knud Ibsen. The character "Gregers Werle" represents the spirit of the Paus family and Upper Telemark, a broader theme that is found in many of Ibsen's plays.

== Characters ==
- Håkon Werle, a wholesale merchant
- Gregers Werle, his son
- Old Ekdal, the former business partner of Håkon Werle
- Hjalmar Ekdal, Old Ekdal's son, a photographer
- Gina Ekdal, Hjalmar Ekdal's wife
- Hedvig, Hjalmar Ekdal's daughter, aged fourteen
- Mrs. Sørby, housekeeper and fiancée of Håkon Werle
- Relling, a doctor, lives below the Ekdals
- Molvik, formerly a student of theology, lives below the Ekdals
- Pettersen, servant to Håkon Werle
- Jensen, a hired waiter
- Mr. Balle, a dinner guest
- Mr. Flor, a dinner guest

== Plot ==
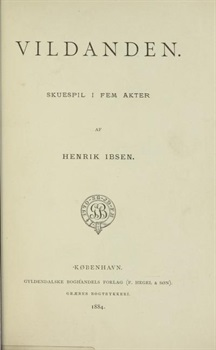
Title page first edition, 1884

The first act opens with a dinner party hosted by Håkon Werle, a wealthy merchant and industrialist. The gathering is attended by his son, Gregers Werle, who has just returned to his father's home following a self-imposed exile. There, he learns the fate of a former classmate, Hjalmar Ekdal. Hjalmar married Gina, a young servant in the Werle household. The older Werle had arranged the match by providing Hjalmar with a home and profession as a photographer. Gregers, whose mother died believing that Gina and Håkon had carried on an affair, becomes enraged at the thought that his old friend is living a life built on a lie.

The remaining four acts take place in Hjalmar Ekdal's apartments. The Ekdals initially appear to be living a life of cozy domesticity. Hjalmar's father makes a living doing odd copying jobs for Werle. Hjalmar runs a portrait studio out of the apartment. Gina helps him run the business in addition to keeping house. They both dote on their daughter Hedvig. Gregers travels directly to their home from the party. While getting acquainted with the family, Hjalmar confesses that Hedvig is both his greatest joy and greatest sorrow, because she is slowly losing her eyesight. The family eagerly reveals a loft in the apartment where they keep various animals like rabbits and pigeons. Most prized is the wild duck they rescued. The duck was wounded by none other than Werle, whose eyesight is also failing. His shot winged the duck, which dived to the bottom of the lake to drown itself by clinging to the seaweed. However, Werle's dog retrieved it, and despite its wounds from the shot and the dog's teeth, the Ekdals nursed the duck back to good health.

Gregers decides to rent the spare room in the apartment. The next day, he begins to realize that there are more lies hanging over the Ekdals than Gina's affair with his father. While talking to Hedvig, she explains that Hjalmar keeps her from school because of her eyesight, but he has no time to tutor her, leaving the girl to escape into imaginary worlds through pictures she sees in books. During their conversation, Gregers hears shots in the attic, and the family explains that Old Ekdal entertains himself by hunting rabbits and birds in the loft, and Hjalmar often joins in the hunts. The activity helps Old Ekdal cling to his former life as a great hunter. Hjalmar also speaks of his 'great invention', which he never specifies. It is related to photography, and he is certain that it will enable him to pay off his debts to Werle and finally make himself and his family completely independent. In order to work on his invention, he often needs to lie down on the couch and think about it.

During a lunch with Gregers and Hjalmar's friends Relling and Molvik, Håkon arrives to try to convince Gregers to return home. Gregers insists that he cannot return and that he will tell Hjalmar the truth. Håkon is certain that Hjalmar will not be grateful for Gregers' intervention. After he leaves, Gregers asks Hjalmar to accompany him on a walk, where he reveals the truth about Gina's affair with his father.

Upon returning home, Hjalmar is aloof from his wife and daughter. He demands to handle all future photography business by himself with no help from Gina. He also demands to manage the family's finances, which Gina has traditionally done. Gina begs him to reconsider, suggesting that with all his time consumed he will not be able to work on his invention. Hedvig adds that he also will not have time to spend in the loft with the wild duck. Embittered by Gregers' news, Hjalmar bristles at the suggestion and confesses that he would like to wring the duck's neck. Indulging his mood, Hjalmar confronts Gina about her affair with Håkon. She confesses to it, but insists that she loves Hjalmar intensely.

In the midst of the argument, Gregers returns, stunned to find that the couple are not overjoyed to be living without such a lie hanging over their heads. Mrs. Sørby arrives with a letter for Hedvig, and the news that she herself is marrying Håkon. The letter announces that Håkon is paying Old Ekdal a pension of 100 crowns per month until his death. Upon his death, the allowance will be transferred to Hedvig for the remainder of her life. This news sickens Hjalmar even further, and it dawns on him that Hedvig may very well be Håkon's child. He cannot stand the sight of Hedvig any longer, and leaves the house to drink with Molvik and Relling. Gregers tries to calm the distraught Hedvig by suggesting that she sacrifice the wild duck for her father's happiness. Hedvig is desperate to win back her father's love, and agrees to have her grandfather shoot the duck in the morning.

The next day, Relling arrives to tell the family that Hjalmar has stayed with him. He is appalled at what Gregers has done, and he reveals that he long ago implanted the idea of the invention with Hjalmar as a "life-lie" to keep him from giving in to despair. The pair argue as Hjalmar returns to gather his materials to work on the invention. He is overwhelmed by the number of details involved in moving out of the apartment. Hedvig is overjoyed to see him, but Hjalmar demands to be "free from intruders" while he thinks about his next move. Crushed, Hedvig remembers the wild duck and goes to the loft with a pistol. After hearing a shot, the family assumes Old Ekdal is hunting in the loft, but Gregers knows he has shot the wild duck for Hedvig. He explains the sacrifice to Hjalmar who is deeply touched. When Old Ekdal emerges from his room, the family realizes he could not have fired the gun in the loft. They rush in to see Hedvig lying on the ground. No one can find a wound, and Relling has to examine the girl. He finds that the shot has penetrated her breastbone and she died immediately. Given the powder burns on her shirt, he determines that she shot herself. Hjalmar begs for her to live again so that she can see how much he loves her. The play ends with Relling and Gregers arguing again. Gregers insists that Hedvig did not die in vain, because her suicide unleashed a greatness within Hjalmar. Relling sneers at the notion, and insists that Hjalmar will be a drunk within a year.

== Analysis and criticism ==
Guided by a fervent strain of idealism, Gregers endeavors to reveal the truth to Hjalmar, and thereby free him from the mendacity which surrounds him. To that end, Gregers takes up residence in the Ekdal home.

He meddles in the affairs of a strange family, producing disastrous results. Figuratively speaking, he lives in a house whose closets are full of skeletons. Over the course of the play the many secrets that lie behind the Ekdals' apparently happy home are revealed to Gregers, who insists on pursuing the absolute truth, or the "Summons of the Ideal". This family has achieved a tolerable modus vivendi by ignoring the skeletons (among the secrets: Gregers' father may have impregnated his servant Gina then married her off to Hjalmar to legitimize the child, and Hjalmar's father has been disgraced and imprisoned for a crime the elder Werle contributed to but allowed Ekdahl alone to take the blame) and by permitting each member to live in a dreamworld of his own—the feckless father believing himself to be a great inventor, the grandfather dwelling on the past when he was a mighty sportsman, and little Hedvig, the child, centering her emotional life on an attic where a wounded wild duck leads a crippled existence in a make-believe forest.

To the idealist all this appears intolerable. To him as to other admirers of Ibsen it must seem that the whole family is leading a life "based on a lie"; all sorts of evils are "growing in the dark". The remedy is obviously to face facts, to speak frankly, to let in the light. However, in this play the revelation of the truth is not a happy event because it rips up the foundation of the Ekdal family. When the skeletons are brought out of the closet, the whole dreamworld collapses; the weak husband thinks it is his duty to leave his wife, and the little girl, after trying to sacrifice her precious duck, shoots herself with the same gun (overhearing the fatal words from Hjalmar: "Would she lay down her life for me?"). One of the famous quotes from the doctor Relling who built up and maintained the lies the family is founded on is "Deprive the average human being of his life-lie, and you rob him of his happiness."

Different translations use different words for the "life-lie". In Eva le Gallienne's translation, Relling says "I try to discover the Basic Lie – the pet illusion – that makes life possible; and then I foster it." He also says "No, no; that's what I said: the Basic Lie that makes life possible."

On a symbolical level, Gregers and Relling seem to be opposites (the virtue of truth against the "basic lie"). The two seem to have confronted each other at several cross-roads, and the play ends with an exchange, almost a wager between the two over the possibilities of Hjalmar and his future. In this respect, Relling is a cynic who does not believe that Hjalmar will ever change, while Gregers still thinks there is hope for his eventual "redemption".

Before the play starts, Gregers worked on a plant in the mountains, and is accused by Relling (present there as well), of "intriguing" with the local serfs (actually commoners). Thus, there is a social criticism in the play, where Gregers is trying to get in touch with common men, whilst his father is mingling with high society figures – a setting in which his friend Hjalmar Ekdal is a stranger, and his father, disgraced by old Werle, is ignored by his son amongst his betters. From a social rather than a symbolic point of view, Gregers is trying to root out an unhealthy system, arguing that "truth shall set you free". In that respect, Relling, plotting with old Werle, is an advocate for the same system, and initially the opposite of Gregers.

One could argue that Gregers would feel responsible for the Ekdal family and their plight, as this is an apparent consequence of his father's manipulations and schemes. Early on, he mentions that his mother obviously died from neglect, or was driven into alcoholism by her husband's actions. As old Werle points out: "you see me with the eyes of your mother". In this respect, the Ekdal family are helpless victims, and so is Hedvig.

== Background ==
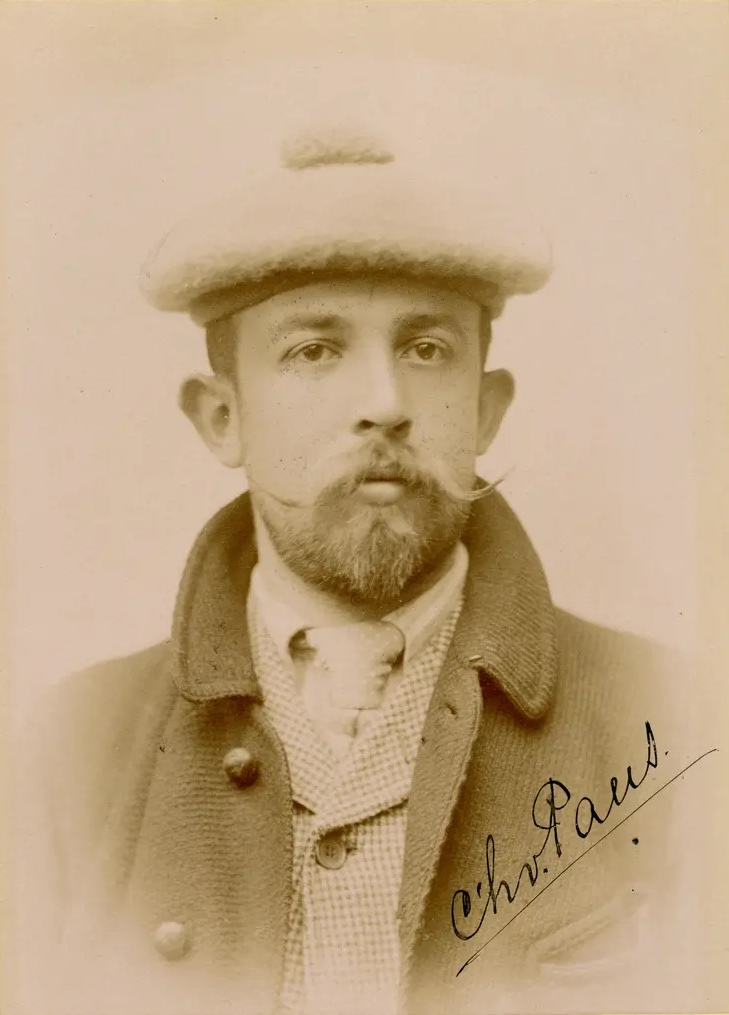
Count Christopher Paus (pictured around 1890) paid an extended visit to Ibsen in Rome in 1884, when Ibsen was working on The Wild Duck, an intimate play that draws inspiration from his own family. It was the only meeting between Ibsen and his family from Skien during Ibsen's years in exile. Ibsen had not been this close to his own family since he left his hometown over 30 years ago, and was eager to hear news from his family and hometown. Shortly after the visit Ibsen declared that he had overcome a writer's block.

Robert Ferguson notes that The Wild Duck did not come easily to Ibsen. During the writing process, Norway was characterized by political turmoil, and from his voluntary exile in Rome, Ibsen was concerned that "the strength of an intimate, personal play such as The Wild Duck might drown in the political debate over the introduction of parliamentarism in Norway". In the spring of 1884 a young relative, Count Christopher Paus, paid Ibsen an extended visit to Rome. Jørgen Haave wrote that "Ibsen had not been this close to his own family since he left his hometown over 30 years ago;" in fact it was the only meeting between Ibsen and his family during Ibsen's decades in exile. Ibsen was eager to hear news regarding the family in Skien. Shortly after the meeting Ibsen declared that he had overcome a writer's block and that he "writes with full force." In the summer of 1884 he completed the play in Gossensaß.

As in many of Ibsen's plays, characters are based on or named after his family members to a greater or lesser extent. The character Old Ekdal is regarded by most Ibsen scholars as one of Ibsen's most important literary portraits of his father Knud Ibsen. Ibsen had previously portrayed his father as the characters "Jon Gynt" and "Daniel Hejre", where the son's judgment of his father's wastefulness was both harsh and bitter. In old Ekdal's character, however, the poet looks at his father, "the forlorn Knud Ibsen, in a conciliatory and compassionate way".

According to Ibsen scholar Jon Nygaard, the character Gregers Werle represents the spirit of the Paus family and Upper Telemark, a broader theme that is found in many of Ibsen's plays; Nygaard points out that Høydalsverket, where Werle lived for years, is an obvious reference to Upper Telemark and especially Høydalsmo; Ibsen's ancestor Paul Paus owned Høydalsmo Stave Church.

The character Hedvig is named after the Paus family, where the Hedvig name had been passed on for generations, and more specifically after Ibsen's grandmother Hedevig Paus and sister Hedvig Ibsen.

Ibsen's model for Hedvig, especially her outward appearance, was a 13-year-old Italian-resident German girl he met in Gossensaß in the summer of 1884, Martha Kopf (born 1870), daughter of the sculptor Joseph von Kopf, who lived in Rome. Ibsen wrote in a letter to his son Sigurd Ibsen: "The German sculptor, Professor Kopf from Rome, has with him a 13-year-old daughter, who is the most excellent model for Hedvig that I could wish for; she is beautiful, has a serious face and personality, and is a little greedy." There is a bust of Martha Kopf by her later husband Hugo Berwald.

== Production ==
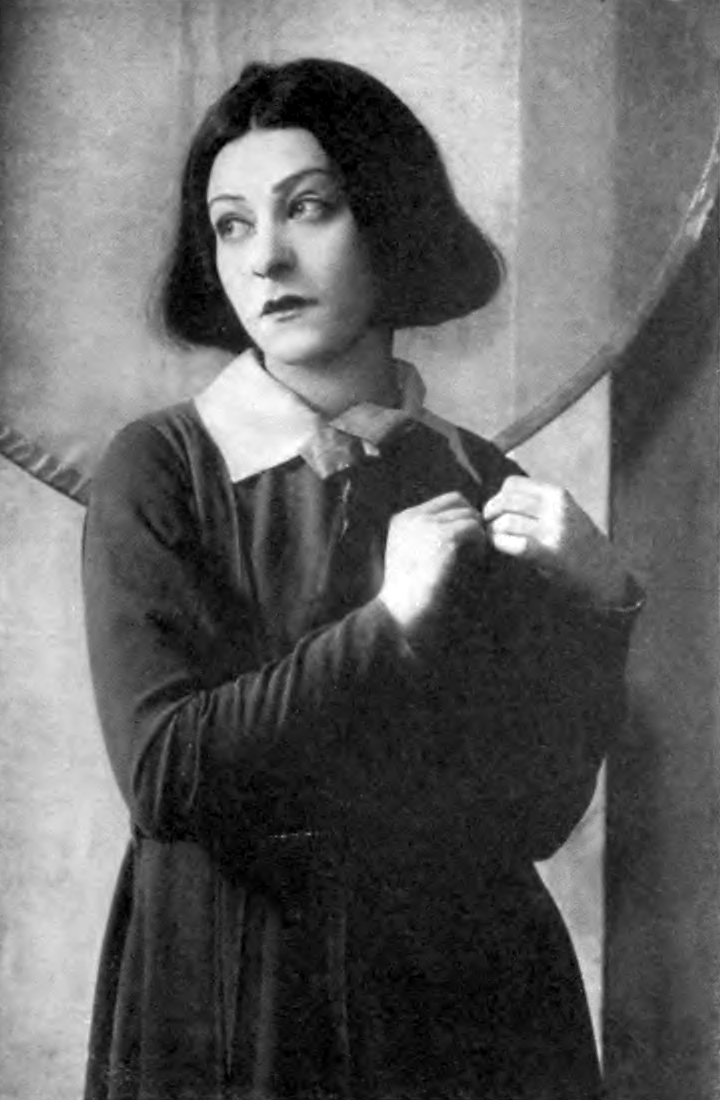
Alla Nazimova as Hedvig in the first English-language production of The Wild Duck (1918)

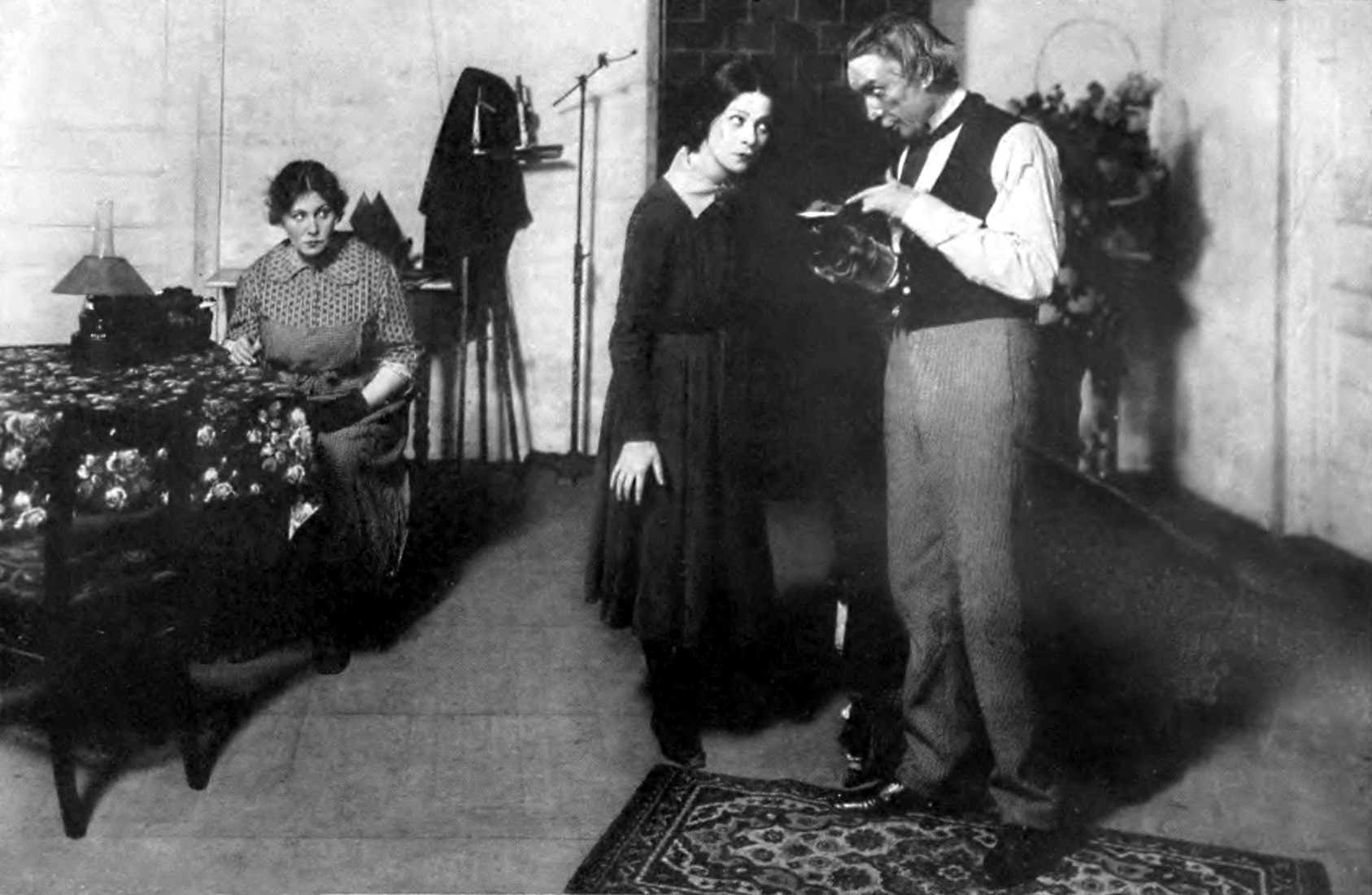
Amy Veness (Gina Ekdal), Alla Nazimova (Hedvig) and Edward Connelly (Old Ekdal) in the original Broadway production of The Wild Duck (1918)

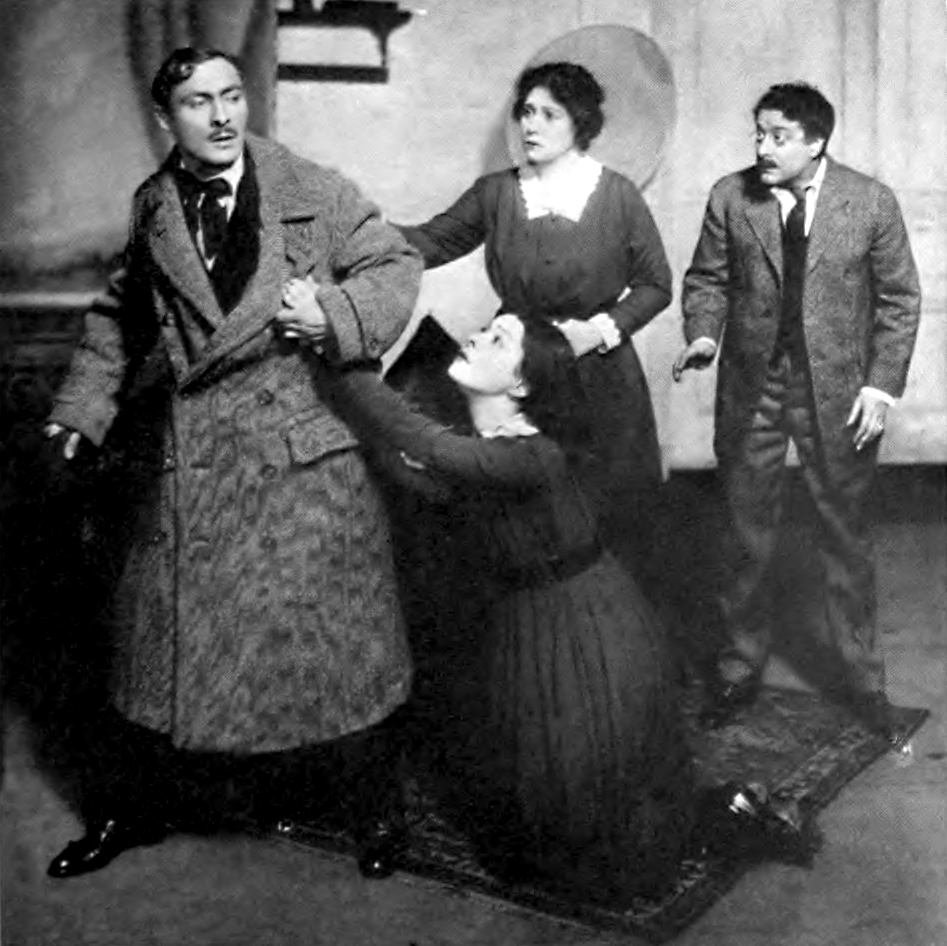
Lionel Atwill (Hjalmer Ekdal), Alla Nazimova (Hedvig), Amy Veness (Gina Ekdal) and Harry Mestayer (Gregers Werle) in the original Broadway production of The Wild Duck (1918)

=== Premiere ===
The Wild Duck premiered on 9 January 1885 at Den Nationale Scene, Bergen, Norway.

On 8 November 1894, the first English translation of The Wild Duck by William Archer was performed at the Novelty Theatre in London, England. The play's first performance in the UK was well-received, and it further contributed to Ibsen's growing reputation as a prominent playwright in English-speaking countries.

=== Broadway ===
Produced by Arthur Hopkins, the first English-language production of The Wild Duck opened on March 11, 1918, at the Plymouth Theatre in New York City. The three-act drama ran through April 1918.

- Dodson Mitchell as Werle
- Harry Mestayer as Gregers Werle
- Edward Connelly as Old Ekdal
- Lionel Atwill as Hjalmar Ekdal
- Amy Veness as Gina Ekdal
- Alla Nazimova as Hedvig
- Norah Lamison as Mrs. Sorby
- Lyster Chambers as Relling
- St. Clair Bayfield as Molvik
- Adelbert Knott as Graberg
- A. O. Huhn as Pettersen
- Frederick Gibbs as Jensen
- Walter C. Wilson as A Flabby Gentleman
- J. H. Wright as A Thin-Haired Gentleman
- George Paige as A Short-Sighted Gentleman

=== West End ===
In October 2018, Almeida Theatre staged a new adaptation of the play, created by Robert Icke.

== Adaptations ==
In 1926 the play was adapted into a German silent film, The House of Lies.

In 1963 the play was made into a motion picture by Tancred Ibsen, Henrik Ibsen's grandson.

On 7 March 1968, Irish national public television, Raidió Teilifís Éireann, broadcast a new production starring Ann Rowan, Marian Richardson, Christopher Casson, T. P. McKenna, Blánaid Irvine, Geoffrey Golden and Maurice Good.

In 1971, a television adaptation by Max Faber, directed by Alan Bridges, was broadcast in the BBC's Play of the Month series.

In 1976, a film version in German, written and directed by Hans W. Geißendörfer, was released.

A 1983 film version in English by Tutte Lemkow, directed by Henri Safran, with the characters' names completely anglicized, starred Jeremy Irons and Liv Ullmann.

In 1989, Bo Widerberg directed a three-part Swedish TV series starring Tomas von Brömssen, Pernilla August and Stellan Skarsgård.

In 2015, an Australian film adaptation The Daughter, directed by Simon Stone, was released.

== Awards and nominations ==
=== 1967 Broadway revival ===
Year	Award	Category	Nominee	Result
1967	Tony Award	Best Actor in a Play	Donald Moffat	Nominated
1967	Tony Award	Best Featured Actor in a Play	Sydney Walker	Nominated
1967	Tony Award	Best Costume Design	Nancy Potts	Nominated
