= Ole Paus (shipowner) =

Norwegian ship's captain, ship owner and land owner (1766–1855)

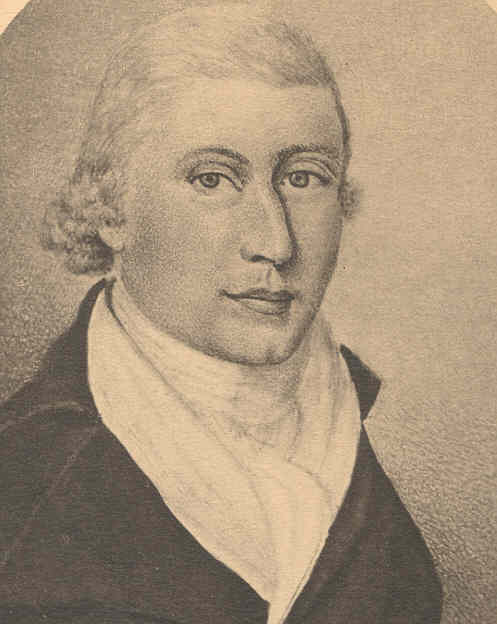
- Ole Paus
- Born: 23 March 1766; Lårdal, Telemark, Denmark-Norway
- Died: 26 July 1855 (aged 89); Skien, Telemark, Sweden-Norway
- Occupation: Shipowner

Ole Paus (23 March 1766 – 26 July 1855) was a Norwegian ship's captain, shipowner and land owner, who belonged to the patriciate of the port town of Skien from the late 18th century. He is noted as the stepfather of Knud Ibsen (1797–1877) as well as being the uncle of Marichen Altenburg (1799–1869) the parents of noted playwright Henrik Ibsen (1828–1906).

== Biography ==
Ole Paus was born at Bjåland in Laurdal prestegjeld, the son of the forest inspector Cornelius Paus and a member of the Paus family. In his youth, he had moved to Skien where he was raised by relatives before went to sea as a 12-year-old and became a skipper. He was married to Johanne Plesner 1770–1847) who had previously been married to ship's captain Henrich Ibsen (1765–1797). Through his marriage, Paus became the brother-in-law of shipowner Nicolay Plesner (1774–1842) and of Diderik von Cappelen, one of Norway's wealthiest men. Cappelen was married to his wife's sister Maria Plesner (1768–1800) in his first marriage and in his second marriage to Marie Severine Blom (1778–1832), who was Ole Paus' cousin. Ole Paus later ran a shipping business in collaboration with Plesner.

Knud Ibsen (1797–1877) had been the only child of Johanne Plesner and Henrich Ibsen. Ole Paus was best man at the wedding of his step-son Knud Ibsen and his niece Marichen Altenburg, a daughter of Ole's sister Hedevig Christine Paus.

From 1801, he owned the estate Rising Nordre in Gjerpen prestegjeld. After the death of his wife in 1847, he moved back to Skien where he died during 1855.

== Influence on Henrik Ibsen ==
According to family tradition (as per Ole Paus's great-great-grandson Karl-Otto Paus, born 1931) and verified by the British National Archives, the ship Wenskabet (Friendship) bound for Truro in England and captained by Ole Paus was captured by the Royal Navy on 24 August 1807, and Ole Paus was made a prisoner of war. This tale must have been well known to Ibsen, and it no doubt influenced his epic poem "Terje Wigen," which has several similarities in that the main person is captured by the Royal Navy and kept prisoner. In any case, Ole Paus must have been released by the end of 1809 at the latest because his son Christopher was born in October 1810.

== Descendants ==
Ole Paus and Johanne Plesner had 5 sons and 4 daughters:

- Henrik Johan Paus (born 1799), lawyer
- Christian Cornelius Paus (1800–1879), Judge, Governor of Bratsberg and Member of Parliament
- Maria Marthine Paus (born 1802)
- Christine Pauline Paus (born 1803), married ship's captain Gerhard van Deurs
- Nicolai Kall Paus (died as an infant 1804)
- Jacob von der Lippe Paus (1806–1826)
- Mariane Nicoline Elisabeth Paus (born 1808)
- Christopher Blom Paus (1810–1898), Shipowner and banker
- Johanne Caroline Paus (born 1813).

Ole Paus was the grandfather of factory owner Ole Paus (1846–1931) and the great-grandfather of chamberlain, land owner and art collector Christopher Tostrup Paus (1862–1943), who received a comital title from Pope Pius XI. His great-great-grandson Herman Paus married Countess Tatyana Tolstoy, a granddaughter of Leo Tolstoy, and their descendants own Herresta and other Swedish estates. Also among his descendants are General Ole Otto Paus, singer Ole Paus, fashion designer Pontine Paus and businessman Peder Nicolas Paus. Many of his descendants, including singer, songwriter Ole Paus, were named for him.

== Modern references ==
Ole Paus was portrayed by actor Per Theodor Haugen (1932–2018) in the 2006 NRK miniseries "An Immortal Man" (En udødelig mann).
