= Christian Cornelius Paus =

Norwegian jurist and politician

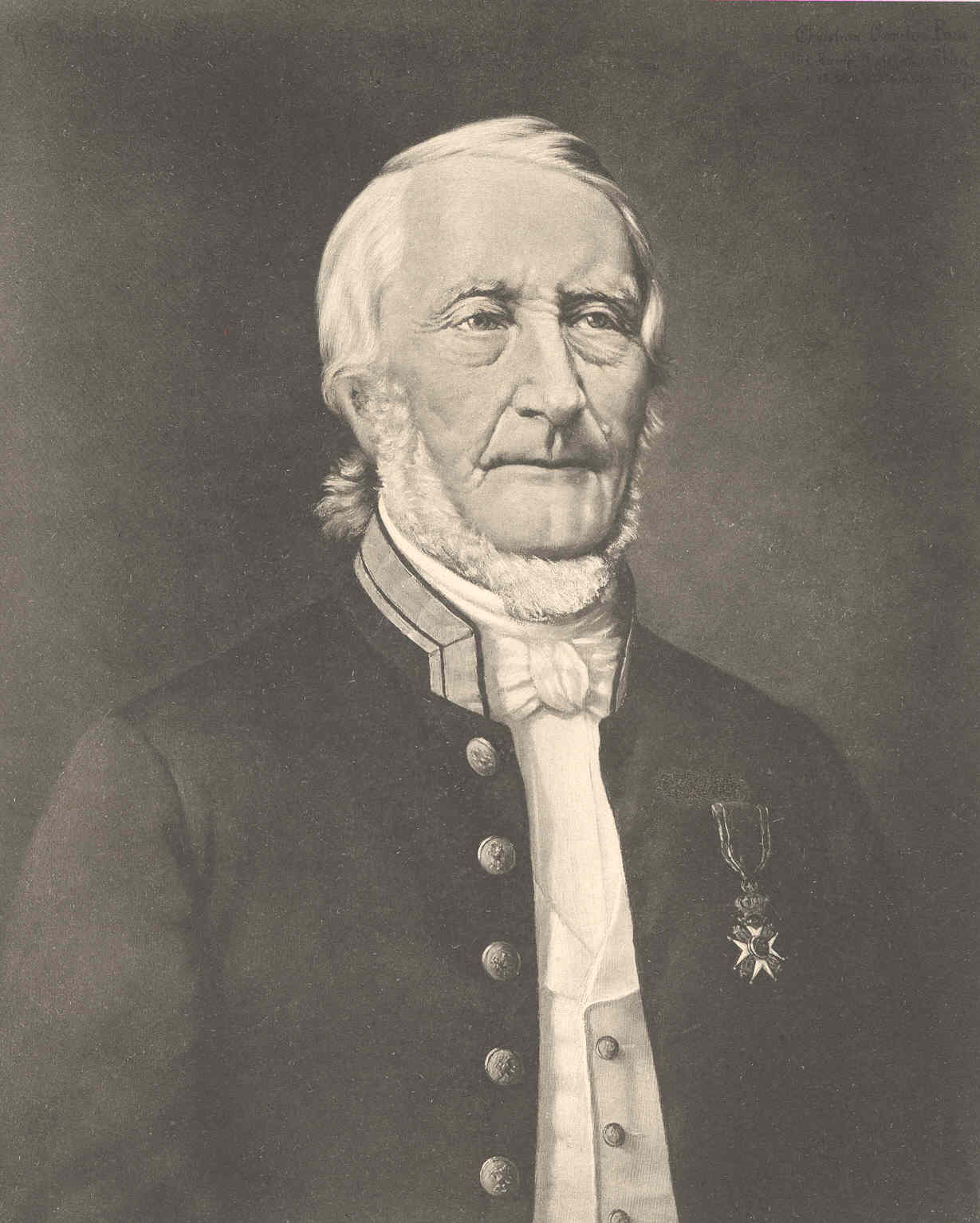

Member of the Norway Parliament for Lister and Mandal
- In office 1848–1850

Member of the Norway Parliament for Skien
- In office 1857–1861

Personal details
- Born: 18 October 1800 Skien, Telemark, Denmark-Norway
- Died: 8 April 1879 (aged 78) Skien, Telemark, Sweden-Norway
- Relations: Knud Ibsen (half-brother), Henrik Ibsen (half-nephew)
- Parent: Ole Paus (father)
- Occupation: Lawyer, judge and civil servant

Christian Cornelius Paus (18 October 1800 – 8 April 1879) was a Norwegian lawyer, civil servant and politician. From 1847 to 1874 he served as the top civil servant of Skien as city judge, magistrate, chief of police and city recorder. He also served three times as Governor of Bratsberg (now Telemark county) between 1862 and 1869 and three terms as a Member of the Norwegian Parliament between 1848 and 1861. He was the uncle of playwright Henrik Ibsen and the inspiration for the character of Peter Stockmann in the play An Enemy of the People.

== Background ==
He was born at Skien in Bratsberg county, Norway, a member of the Paus family. He was the son of ship-owner Ole Paus and Johanne Plesner (in her first marriage married Ibsen), and was the uncle of playwright Henrik Ibsen. He was both the half-brother of Henrik Ibsen's father, Knud Ibsen, and the first cousin of Henrik Ibsen's mother, Marichen Altenburg.

== Career ==
=== Career in the civil service ===
Paus obtained the cand. jur. degree in 1825. He was employed in the Norwegian central government at the Ministry of the Navy from 1822 to 1836, as a senior adviser from 1826. He was bailiff in Lista in Lister og Mandal county from 1836 until he was appointed as city judge (byfogd) in Skien in 1847. In that capacity, he also held the offices of magistrate (magistrat), chief of police (politimester) and city recorder (byskriver), thus making him the main representative of the state in the city. He held all four offices until 1874. He was governor of Bratsberg three times (1862–1863, 1864 and 1868–1869), during the absences of Hans J. C. Aall.

=== Member of Parliament ===
He served three terms as a Member of Norwegian Parliament between 1848 and 1861. He was a member of the Committee on Finance in 1858 and of the Lagting from 1857 to 1860.

== Personal life ==
He was the owner of the manor at Rising in Gjerpen Municipality (Rising i Gjerpen), which he inherited from his father. In 1845 he married Edvarda Margrethe Qvale (1807–1880) from Vega Municipality, a daughter of parish priest Andreas Qvale (1779–1820). She was the widow of the physician Lauritz Johannes Irgens (1807–1837), himself a son of the politician Lars Johannes Irgens and a brother of the Minister of the Navy Nils Christian Irgens. Christian and Edvarda had one daughter, Edvarda Margrethe Paus (1847–1903), who was married from 1870 to the military physician Jørgen Magnus Grønn (1843–1914).

== Honours ==
- Knight of the Order of St. Olav
