= Knud Ibsen =

Norwegian merchant and father of Henrik Ibsen (1797–1877)

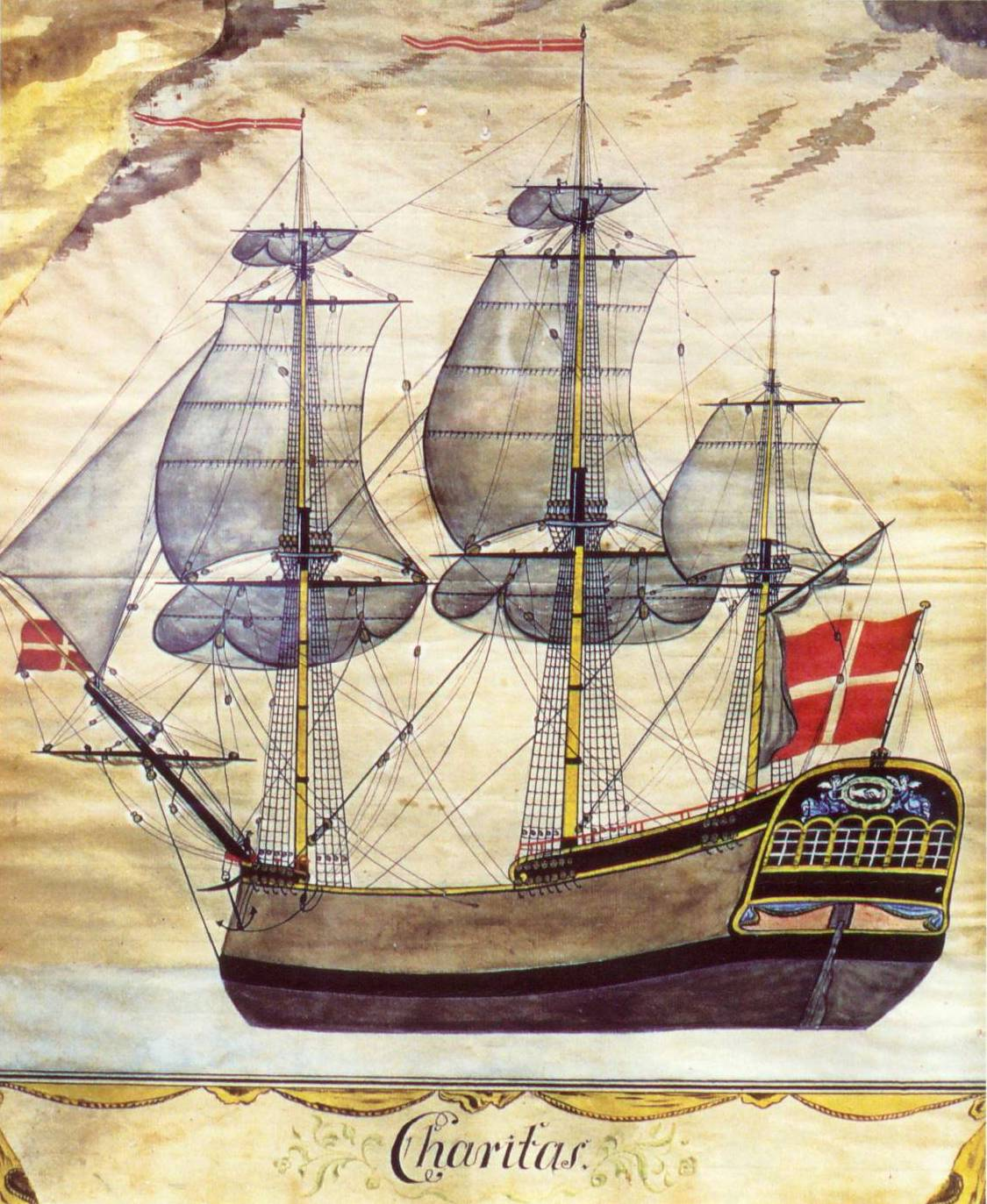
Charitas, the ship captained by Knud's father when he died at sea in 1797

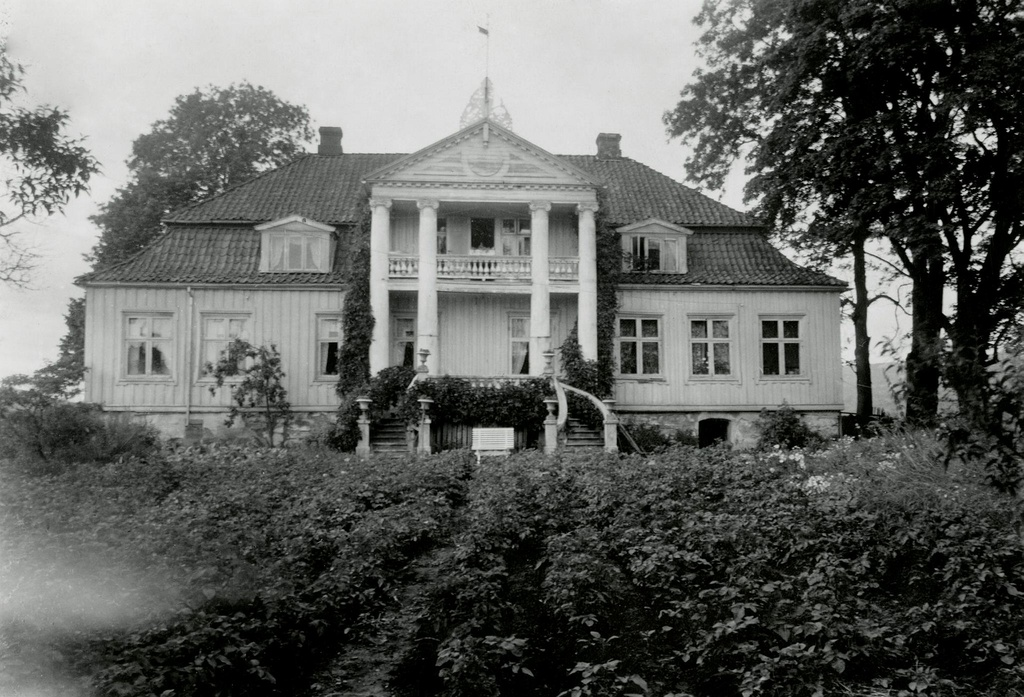
Rising, where Knud grew up

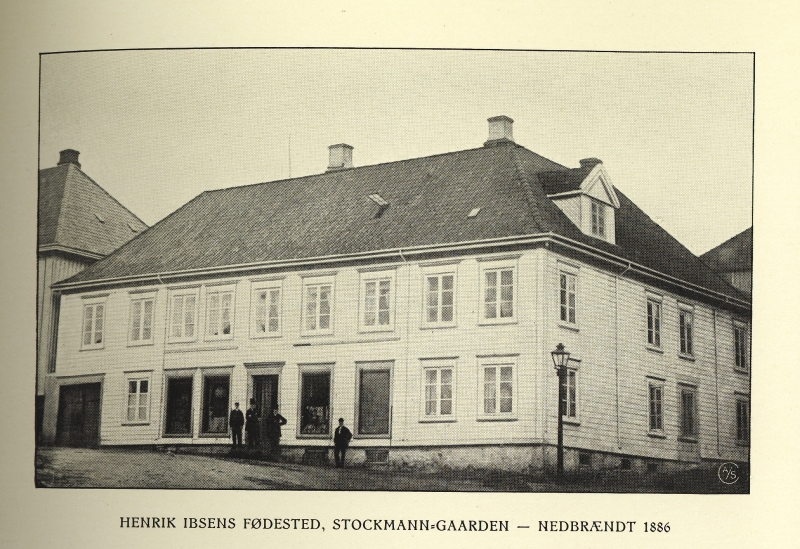
Stockmanngården in Skien, where Knud Ibsen lived with his brother Christopher from 1825. In the same year he married Marichen Altenburg, who moved in with them, and Henrik Ibsen was born there in 1828

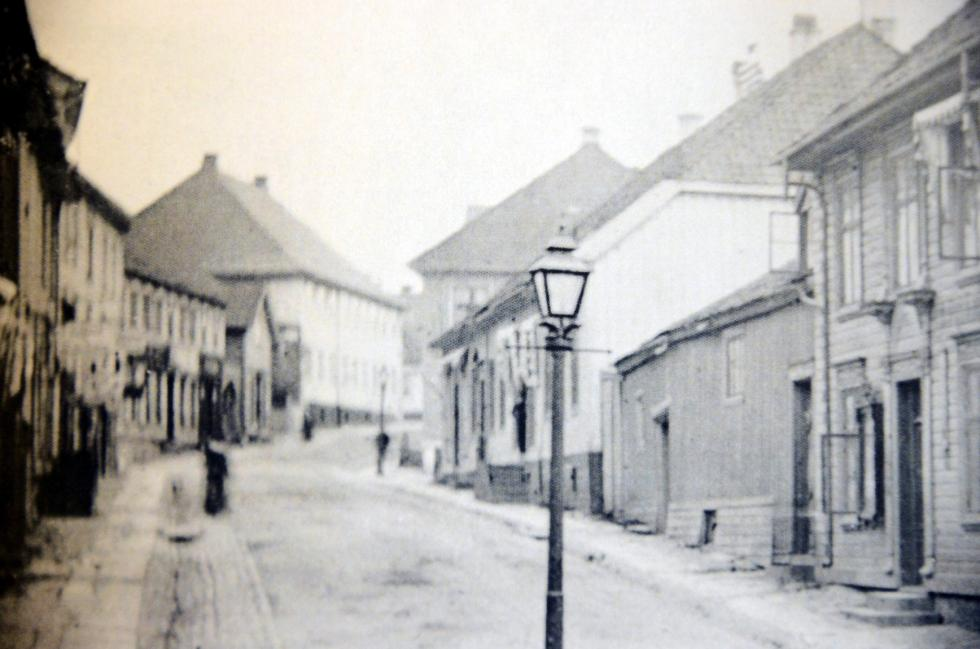
The roof and one of the windows of Altenburggården can be seen in the middle of the picture. Altenburggården was Marichen Altenburg's childhood home. The Ibsen family lived there 1831–1836

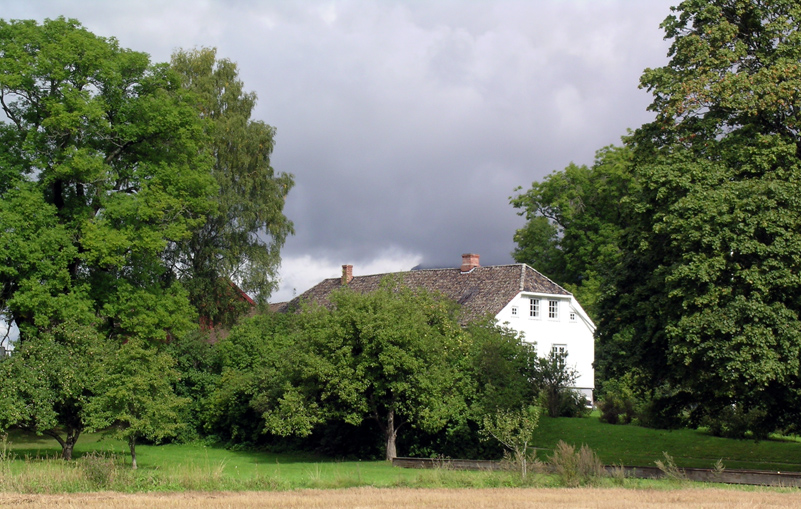
Venstøp outside Skien, originally the Ibsen family's summer house, where they lived permanently 1836–1843. It was a reasonably large farm with large, representative buildings.

Knud Plesner Ibsen (3 October 1797, in Skien – 24 October 1877, in Skien) was a Norwegian merchant from the city of Skien and the father of the playwright Henrik Ibsen. He is widely considered the model for many central characters in his son's plays, including Jon Gynt in Peer Gynt and Old Ekdahl in The Wild Duck. Through the Paus family—the family of Knud's stepfather Ole Paus and Marichen's mother Hedevig—Knud was raised as a close relative of his would-be wife Marichen Altenburg, although they were not closely related biologically.

== Early life ==
Knud Ibsen was the son of ship's captain Henrich Johan Ibsen and Johanne Plesner; his paternal great-grandfather had immigrated from Denmark to Norway in 1726. His father died at sea outside Hesnesøya near Grimstad in November 1797, and the following year, Johanne married ship's captain Ole Paus; in 1799 Ole Paus bought the estate Rising near Skien after selling the Ibsen house in downtown Skien, and the family moved to Rising in 1800. Knud Ibsen grew up at Rising with most of his half-siblings, among them the later lawyer and member of parliament Christian Cornelius Paus and shipowner and banker Christopher Blom Paus. One of his half-brothers, Henrik Johan Paus, grew up in the Skien home of their aunt, uncle and cousin Marichen Altenburg, Knud's later wife.

== Burghership and marriage ==
In 1825 Knud Ibsen, aged 28, acquired the burghership of Skien and established an independent business as a timber and luxury goods merchant there with his younger brother Christopher Blom Paus, then aged 15, as his apprentice. The two brothers moved into the Stockmanngården building, where they rented a part of the building and lived with a maid. On the first floor the brothers sold foreign wines and a variety of luxury items, while also engaging in wholesale export of timber in cooperation with their first cousin Diderik von Cappelen (1795–1866).

On 1 December 1825 Knud married his stepfather's niece Marichen Altenburg, whom he had known since childhood. Henrik Ibsen was born in Stockmanngården in 1828. In 1830 Marichen's mother Hedevig left Altenburggården and her properties and business ventures to her son-in-law Knud, and the Ibsen family moved to Marichen's childhood home in 1831. During the 1820s and 1830s Knud was a wealthy young merchant in Skien, and he was the city's 16th largest taxpayer in 1833.

== Venstøp years ==
In 1835 the family was forced to sell Altenburggården. The following year they moved to their stately summer house, Venstøp, outside of the city. Venstøp was a reasonably large farm with large, representative buildings. They were still relatively affluent, had servants and socialised with other members of the Skien elite.

== Later years ==
In 1843 the Ibsen family returned to Skien, where they lived rent-free in a house owned by Christopher Blom Paus. Knud ran a business as a broker of grain and timber and as an emigration agent, with an office at Mudringen in Skien. The revolutions of 1848 hit his grain and timber business hard. In 1850 and at the behest of his brother Christian Cornelius Paus he was appointed acting harbourmaster of Skien, an important and prestigious position in the thriving port town. The port director and the Ministry of Naval Affairs approved Ibsen's candidacy to take over the position permanently, but suddenly it came to the port director's attention that Ibsen was not to be trusted. A letter from the port director claimed that Ibsen lacked the necessary diligence, security and order, and that he had not delivered all the accounts he was supposed to. "Judge Paus, who received the letter, did not mention that he was the candidate's half-brother, but strongly denied the allegations," writes Haave. In 1851 Fredrik Vauvert was appointed instead. In the 1857 tax records Knud Ibsen was listed as poor, and he was supported by his younger brothers until his death in 1877.

His son Henrik left home in 1843, and never saw his parents again after 1850. In old age Knud Ibsen was conscious and proud of his son's success, commenting that "when the Pauses are dead, they are dead, but my name will live on."

== Legacy ==
Traditional Ibsen historiography has often claimed that Knud Ibsen went bankrupt as a result of speculation, that he became an embittered, moody, alcoholic tyrant, and asserted that this influenced his son's work. New research by Jørgen Haave has refuted such claims about Knud Ibsen and pointed out that older biographical works have uncritically repeated numerous unfounded myths about both of Ibsen's parents, and about the playwright's childhood and background in general. Haave points out that Knud Ibsen's economic problems in the 1830s were mainly the result of the difficult times and something the Ibsen family had in common with many others of the bourgeoisie; Haave further argues that Henrik Ibsen had a relatively happy and comfortable childhood as members of Skien's social elite. According to Haave Henrik was pampered by his father and provoked peers with his superiority and arrogance. It was only in the late 1850s, long after Henrik had left home, that the Ibsen family disintegrated financially and socially, but even when he was officially "poor" and reliant on the support of his brothers, Knud had a maid.

Knud Ibsen is regarded by numerous literary scholars as the model for several characters in his son's plays, including most famously Jon Gynt in Peer Gynt and Old Ekdahl in The Wild Duck, but also Daniel Hejre in The League of Youth. Henrik Ibsen did indeed confirm that he had used his own family as the model for the Gynt family, although he stated that their literary portrayal was an exaggeration.
