= Marichen Altenburg =

Mother of Henrik Ibsen (1799–1869)

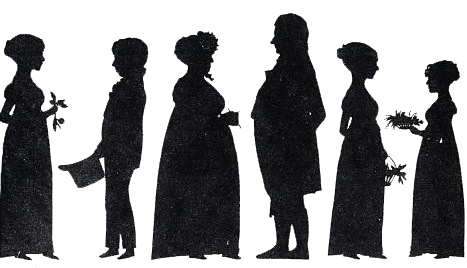
A silhouette of the family in Altenburggården (ca. 1820). Marichen to the far right, her parents in the centre. It is the only existing portrait of her.

Marichen Cornelia Martine Altenburg (24 April 1799 – 3 June 1869) was the mother of the Norwegian playwright Henrik Ibsen and is known as the model for several characters in some of Ibsen's most famous plays, including Åse in Peer Gynt. Through the Paus family—the family of Marichen's mother Hedevig and Knud's stepfather Ole Paus—Marichen was raised as a close relative of her would-be husband Knud Ibsen, although they were not closely related biologically.

== Early life ==
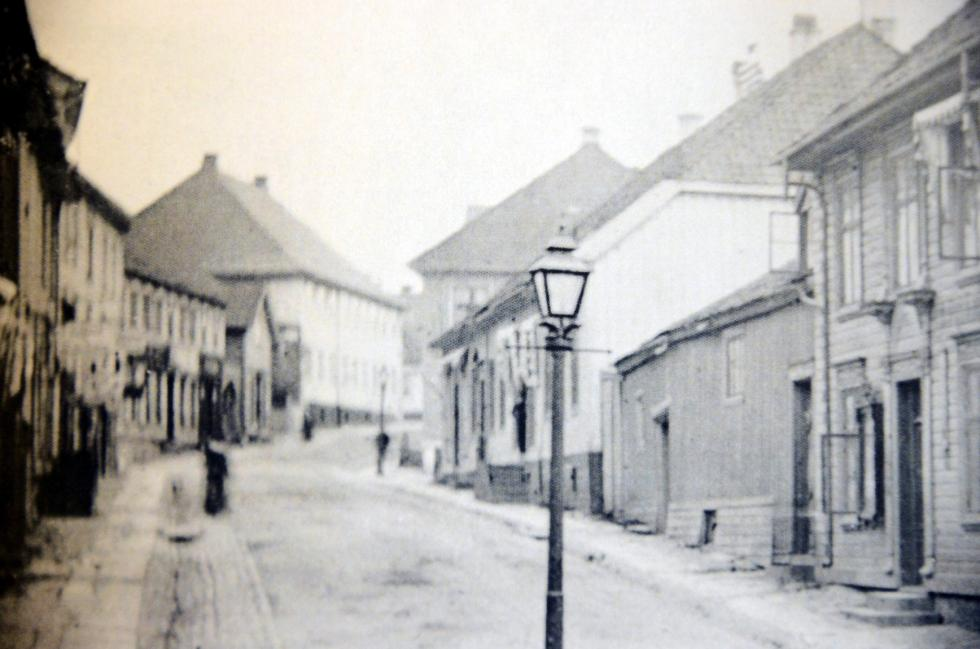
The roof and one of the windows of Altenburggården can be seen in the middle of the picture

Marichen Altenburg was born in Skien as the daughter of the merchant Johan Andreas Altenburg (1763–1824) and Hedevig Christine Paus (1763–1848). Her father was a shipowner, timber merchant and owned a liquor distillery at Lundetangen and a farm outside of town; her mother had been born in Upper Telemark to a family that belonged to the regional elite there, the "aristocracy of officials". She grew up in the stately Altenburg house in central Skien.

== Marriage ==
On 1 December 1825, she married Knud Ibsen, who had established himself as an independent merchant in Skien earlier in that year. Knud Ibsen was the step-son of her uncle, shipowner Ole Paus (who was also best man at the wedding), and they had known each other since childhood. Joan Templeton writes that "the marriage was an excellent family arrangement." By 1830 her mother has transferred the Altenburg house and her business ventures to Knud, who was Skien's 16th largest taxpayer by 1833.

Knud and Marichen had six children: Johan Altenburg Ibsen (1826–1828), Henrik Johan Ibsen (born 1828), Johan Andreas Ibsen (born 1830), Hedvig Ibsen (born 1831), Nicolai Alexander Ibsen (born 1834) and Ole Paus Ibsen (born 1835).

== Myths about Marichen Altenburg ==
Ibsen scholar Jørgen Haave argues that older Ibsen historiography is full of unfounded myths about Marichen and her husband Knud. For example, older Ibsen historiography has often claimed that her husband engaged in heavy speculations, and became an alcoholic tyrant who visited "his bitterness and resentment on his wife and children." These claims have been refuted by newer scholarship, in particular the book Familien Ibsen by Haave. Haave has pointed out that unfounded claims have uncritically been repeated in Ibsen scholarship during the 20th century. Earlier Ibsen scholarship has claimed that Marichen Altenburg was an avid painter and in love with the theatre, and "worried her upright parents by attending every performance of the travelling Danish troupes, and by continuing to play with her childhood dolls when she was grown." Haave points out that there weren't any theatre troupes active in the area at the time, and argues that her artistic activities amounted to no more than what was expected from a girl of her social class.

== Influence on Ibsen's work ==
Henrik Ibsen confirmed on several occasions that he both modelled and named characters in his plays after his own family. In a letter to Georg Brandes, Ibsen wrote that his own family and childhood had served "as some kind of model" for the Gynt family in Peer Gynt, and in a letter to Peter Hansen, Ibsen confirmed that the character Åse, Peer Gynt's mother, was based on his own mother, "with the necessary exaggerations". Ferguson argues that Marichen also served as the model for Inga of Varteig in The Pretenders.

== In film and theatre ==
Marichen Altenburg was portrayed by Kjersti Holmen in the 2006 NRK mini series En udødelig mann (Indomitable one).

She was portrayed by Cecilie Graasvold in Ibsensafari.
