= Peder Hansson Paus =

Norwegian lawyer and government official

Peder Hansson Paus (1691 – 1759) was a Norwegian lawyer and government official who served as governor and district judge—i.e. the region's foremost government official—of Upper Telemark from 1723 to 1751. He was also known for authoring a cultural and historical description of the district and a glossary of Telemark dialect in 1743. Besides his official duties, he engaged in personal business ventures, including interests in mining.

== Biography ==
He was born in Kviteseid. He belonged to the Paus family and was the son of the parish priest of Kviteseid, Hans Povelsson Paus. His great-grandfather Peder Povelsson Paus came to Telemark in the early 17th century and became provost of Upper Telemark. His mother, Susanne Morland (1670–1747), was the daughter of provost Amund Morland and granddaughter of the estate owners Christen Andersen and Anne Gundersdatter of Borgestad Manor. Peder's father is also known for authoring the poem Stolt Anne.

On May 21, 1717, he was designated as the successor of his uncle Cornelius Povelsson Paus (1662–1723) as governor and district judge of Upper Telemark. The office included both judicial and administrative duties and was the foremost government official of Upper Telemark, a vast region. When his uncle died, Peder Paus assumed the office, which then included the parishes of Fyresdal, Lårdal, Vinje, Kviteseid (with Brunkeberg, Nissedal, Treungen, and Vrådal), and Seljord. However, he had no formal appointment from the king in Copenhagen, and thus took office on his own accord based on his 1717 "letter of expectation." It was only after several years that the king issued a formal letter of appointment. From the time he assumed office, he lived on the Midsund farm in Kviteseid, making Kviteseid the administrative seat of Upper Telemark, a tradition that has continued to this day. He belonged to "one of the most prominent judge dynasties" in Norway, with the office remaining in the family for 106 years.

Peder Paus has been described as a diligent and righteous district judge who distinguished himself with good and independent legal judgments that emphasized common sense and knowledge of human nature. He wrote a cultural-historical description of the district and a glossary of Telemark dialect in 1743. As district judge, Peder Paus also dealt extensively with the larger trading houses at Skiensfjorden, involving property registrations, fees, etc., as reflected in the main books of Herman Leopoldus Løvenskiold and Niels Aall the Elder.

In 1745, a consortium including Peder Paus, Niels Aall, the mining secretary Wildhagen, Adam Adamsen Ziener (Peder Paus' later son-in-law), and several members of the von Koss family received permission for the copper deposits at Åmdal. Mining was carried out there by this consortium until shortly after 1758.

Peder Paus was married first to Cathrine Medea Maj Hermansdatter (died 1736) from Denmark, daughter of the parish priest of Ølsted on Zealand, Herman Arentsen (1647–1698), and Gundel Sørensdatter May. Herman was the son of the well-known topographer, councilor in Copenhagen, and more, Arent Berntsen, while Gundel was the daughter of the provost in Holbæk, Søren Nielsen May, and Catharina Motzfeldt, who in turn was the daughter of the wine merchant and city captain in Copenhagen, Peter Motzfeldt (1584–1650). Mother-in-law Gundel May was also a cousin of statesman Peder Griffenfeld. In his second marriage, Peder Paus was married to his cousin Hedvig Coldevin Corneliusdatter Paus (1711–1771), daughter of his predecessor as district judge, Cornelius Paus, and Valborg Rafn.

Peder Paus had two children, both from his first marriage: Anna Susanna Paus (1720–1798), married to Adam Adamsen Ziener (born 1709), and his successor as district judge in Upper Telemark, Hans Paus (1721–1774). Son Hans Paus was married to the Danish-born Andrea Jaspara Nissen and has numerous descendants.

Peder Paus bore in his coat of arms a dove with an olive branch in its beak, sitting on a coiled snake.
