= Paus (surname) =

Paus or Pauss is a surname. Notable people with the surname include:

== Norwegian Paus family ==
- Nikolas Sigurdsson Paus (fl. 1329–1347), Norwegian nobleman and Lawspeaker of Oslo
- Hans Povelsson Paus the Elder (1587–1648), Norwegian priest
  - Povel Hansson Paus (1620–1658), Norwegian priest, son of Hans Paus
- Peder Povelsson Paus (1590–1653), Norwegian cleric and provost of Upper Telemark, brother of Hans Paus; the siblings are the earliest certain members of the family
  - Povel Pedersson Paus (1625–1682), Norwegian cleric, son of Peder Paus
    - Cornelius Povelsson Paus (1662–1723), Norwegian lawyer, governor and district judge, son of Povel Pedersson Paus
    - Hans Povelsson Paus (1656–1715), Norwegian priest and poet, son of Povel Pedersson Paus
- Cornelius Paus (civil servant) (1726–1799), Norwegian civil servant
- Ole Paus (shipowner) (1766–1855), Norwegian ship's captain, shipowner and land owner
  - Henrik Johan Paus (1799–1893), Norwegian lawyer and government official, son of Ole Paus, uncle of playwright Henrik Ibsen
    - Johan Altenborg Paus (1834–1894), Norwegian artillery officer and war commissioner, son of Henrik Paus
      - Christopher de Paus (1862–1943), Norwegian-born aristocrat, papal courtier and philanthropist
  - Christian Cornelius Paus (1800–1879), Norwegian lawyer, civil servant and politician, son of Ole Paus, uncle of Henrik Ibsen
  - Christopher Blom Paus (1810–1898), Norwegian shipowner, merchant and banker, son of Ole Paus, uncle of Henrik Ibsen
    - Ole Paus (businessman) (1846–1931), Norwegian industrialist and bank chairman, son of Christopher Paus
      - Thorleif Paus (1881–1976), Norwegian diplomat, estate owner and businessman, son of Ole Paus
        - Ole Paus (general) (1910–2003), Norwegian general, diplomat and NATO official, son of Thorleif Paus
          - Ole Paus (1947–2023), Norwegian singer-songwriter and poet, son of the general
            - Marcus Paus (born 1979), Norwegian composer
- Bernhard Pauss (1839–1907), Norwegian theologian, educator, author and missionary leader
- Henriette Pauss (1841–1918), Norwegian teacher, editor, girls' education pioneer, humanitarian, missionary leader and estate owner, wife of Bernhard Pauss
  - Nikolai Nissen Paus (1877–1956), Norwegian surgeon, hospital director and humanitarian, son of Bernhard and Henriette Pauss
  - Augustin Paus (1881–1945), Norwegian engineer and industrial leader, son of Bernhard and Henriette Pauss
  - George Wegner Paus (1882–1923), Norwegian lawyer, mountaineer, skiing pioneer, sailor, rower, poet, diplomat and business executive, son of Bernhard and Henriette Pauss
    - Bernhard Paus (1910–1999), Norwegian orthopedic surgeon and humanitarian, son of Nikolai Paus
    - Vilhelm Paus (1915–1995), Norwegian lawyer, diplomat and business executive, son of Nikolai Paus
- Olav Pauss (1863–1928), Norwegian ship-owner, nephew of Bernhard Pauss

== Others ==
- André Paus (born 1965), Dutch former football manager and player
- Carl Pauss, pseudonym used by Maria Vespermann (1823–1882), German author, composer and painter
- Dalibor Paus (born 1973), Croatian politician
- Felicitas Pauss (born 1951), Austrian physicist
- Lisa Paus (born 1968), German politician
