= Paus (disambiguation) =

Paus may refer to:

== People ==
- Paus family, a prominent Norwegian family
- Paus (surname), a list of people, many from the Paus family and some not

== Other uses ==
- Paus (Arcadia), a town of ancient Arcadia, Greece
- Paus (band), a Swedish band
  - Paus (album), a 1998 album by the band
- PAUS, a Portuguese alternative rock band
