= Hans Krag =

Hans Krag may refer to:

- Hans Hagerup Krag (1829–1907), Norwegian engineer
- Hans Krag (writer) (1904–1984), Norwegian author on heraldry
