= Royal clergy =

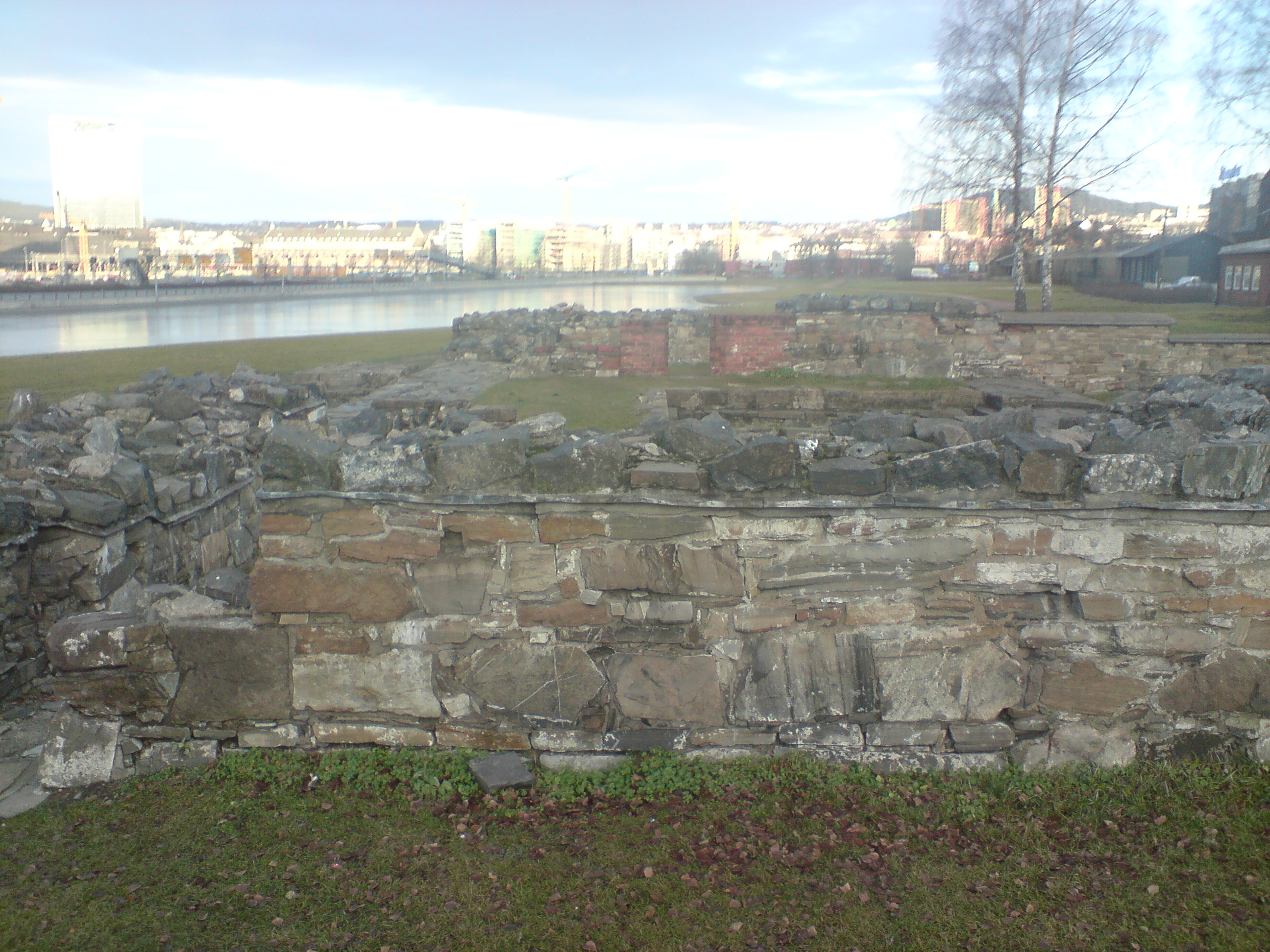
St. Mary's Church, Oslo

The royal clergy (Norwegian: Den kongelige kapellgeistlighet) was a body of clergy in the service of the King of Norway during the Middle Ages. The term, coined by modern historians, refers to the priests attached to the 14 royal "chapels" located throughout Norway.

From 1308, during the reign of Haakon V, the royal clergy development into a distinct institution that was largely independent of the Norwegian church hierarchy. Its members were granted extensive privileges by the king and became major landowners. During the Late Middle Ages, the royal clergy reached the height of its influence, effectively formed the Norwegian state administration.

During the Late Middle Ages, the provost of the royal chapel of Oslo, St Mary's Church, was independent of the Bishop of Oslo. Although termed a "chapel", St Mary's was among the largest and most impressive churches in Norway and possessed its own cathedral chapter.

In 1300, King Haakon granted St Mary's Church numerous privileges and decreed that the provost should hold the rank of a lendman, the canons the rank of a Knight, the vicars and deacons the rank of hirdmenn, and other clerics the rank of a kjertesvein. As a result, the clergy of St Mary's church were accorded exceptionally high aristocratic status, according to Sverre Bagge.

In 1314, King Haakon further decreed that the provost of St Mary's Church should "for eternity" also hold the offices of Chancellor of Norway and Keeper of the Great Seal. Another priest of St Mary's serves as Vice-Chancellor.

The royal clergy also provided a pool from which the King could recruit competent and loyal officials for other high offices. For its time, the institution was notably meritocratic, as positions were not hereditary, which helped ensured the recruitment of capable and well educated individuals. At the same time, most of the royal clergy—particularly those who rose to its upper ranked, such as canons and provosts—were drawen from the lower nobility, and occasionally from the high nobility. Peter Andreas Munch describes the royal clergy as a counterweight to the secular aristocracy, characterized by stronger loyalty to the king and a more pronounced service orientation than both the secular and the ordinary ecclesiastical aristocracy.

As the influence of bishops with seats in the Council of the Realm increased during the Late Middle Ages, the royal clergy continue to function as an important counterweight. The royal clergy was dissolved in 1545.

== List of members ==
The following list contains known members of the Royal Clergy.

Name	Year of appointment	Clerical title	Equal to secular title	Agnatic progenitor of	Ref.
Hans Olufsson	1540s	Canon	Knight	Paus family	

== See also ==
- Norwegian nobility
