= Cornelius Povelsson Paus =

Norwegian judge

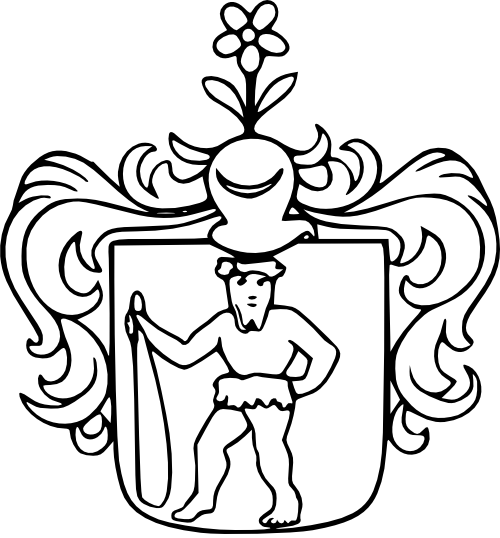
Coat of arms, from the book Norsk heraldisk mønstring 1699–1730

Cornelius Povelsson Paus (1662 – 1723) was a Norwegian lawyer and government official who served as governor and district judge—i.e. the region's foremost government official—of Upper Telemark from 1696 to 1723. His descendants include the playwright Henrik Ibsen.

== Biography ==
Cornelius Povelsson Paus belonged to the Paus family and was the son of the parish priest for Hjartdal prestegjeld and signatory of the 1661 Sovereignty Act, Povel Pedersson Paus, and Ingrid Corneliusdatter Trinepol from Skien. He was born shortly after midsummer in 1662 and was baptized on 17 August of the same year by his father's colleague, provost Sakarias Jonsson Skancke. He was named after his maternal grandfather, the timber merchant in Skien, Cornelius Jansen Trinepol, and was the brother of the priest Hans Povelsson Paus. He married Valborg Jørgensdatter Rafn (1673–1726), daughter of the district judge of Upper Telemark, Jørgen Hansen Rafn, and Margrethe Fredriksdatter Blom.

He received his initial education from his father, who was considered a very learned and thoughtful personality. He later attended Oslo Cathedral School and then studied at the University of Copenhagen. He began as an assistant judge for his father-in-law and was appointed by King Christian V as his father-in-law's successor as governor and district judge on 21 August 1696, upon recommendation from his father-in-law and Bratsberg governor Henrik Nilsen Adeler. He held the office until his death in February 1723. In 1714 he and his governor colleague in Lower Telemark Marcus Hanssen had Eastern Upper Telemark district shared between them, thus enlarging his jurisdiction significantly. He was the second in line in "one of the most prominent district judge dynasties" in Norway and was succeeded in office by his nephew Peder Hansson Paus.

Cornelius Paus bore a coat of arms featuring a wild man with a club; a drawing of the coat of arms by Hans Krag is published in the book Norsk heraldisk mønstring 1699–1730.

Cornelius Paus was the father of the judge Paul Paus (1697–1768). Among Cornelius Paus' descendants are Henrik Ibsen and Ole Paus.
