= Hans Olufsson =

Sir Hans Olufsson (Note: Both as a member of the clergy and as a member of the nobility as he was styled as herr in Norwegian. The style sira (sir) had been introduced as the style for clergymen in Norway in the 13th century and gradually been replaced by the Norwegianized version herr from the 15th century. The style of herr was reserved for clergy and noblemen. Its latin form is Dominus, conventionally rendered as Sir as an ecclesiastical title in English. Olufsson is a patronymic; thus he would be known as "Sir Hans" or as "Sir Hans Olufsson," but never be referred to by the patronymic alone.) (c. 1495–1500 – 18 September 1570, in Oslo) was a Norwegian high-ranking cleric and nobleman during the 16th century.

He was a member of the royal clergy, the clergy in the personal service of the King of Norway and the effective state administration in the Middle Ages, and was one of the six canons at St Mary's Church, the royal chapel in Oslo and the seat of government of Norway. Together with the other canons and the provost, he was a member of the cathedral chapter of St Mary's Church. The provost ex officio also held the office of Chancellor of Norway, with one of the canons serving as Vice-Chancellor; it is unknown if Hans Olufsson served as Vice-Chancellor. As decreed by Haakon V of Norway in a 1300 royal proclamation, the canons of St Mary's Church held the rank and privileges of a Knight, the highest rank of nobility in Norway since 1308 and typically reserved for noblemen with a significant national political role.

Hans Olufsson is first mentioned in 1542 as a canon at St Mary's Church, and undoubtedly was a priest both before and after the Reformation in Denmark–Norway and Holstein. As indicated by his patronymic, Hans Olufsson's father was named Oluf. Due to his career as a member of the royal clergy, he almost certainly had a privileged family background. Most canons in Norway at the time were recruited from the lower nobility, and normally studied at universities abroad, which was normally only possible with an affluent background. Hans Olufsson held a prebend (estate held for his lifetime), the prebend of Saint Mary's altar sub lectorio, also known as the prebend of Dillevik, that included the income of 43 church properties (36 huder, hides) in Eastern Norway.

After 1545, when the cathedral chapter of St Mary's Church was dissolved, Hans Olufsson served as a priest at Oslo Cathedral, but retained his prebend affiliated with the estate of St Mary's Church. He died on the night between 17 and 18 September 1570 and was buried in Oslo Cathedral on 19 September. Following his death, his prebend passed to Jens Nilssøn, the noted Oslo humanist and later Bishop of Oslo.

Hans Olufsson's son, as documented by court proceedings from 1602, was Povel Hansson (born ca. 1545–50), who was a merchant in Oslo. According to genealogist S.H. Finne-Grønn, Povel Hansson was almost certainly the father of the priests Hans Povelsson Paus (1587–1648) and Peder Povelsson Paus (1590–1653), two brothers from Oslo who were the progenitors of the Paus family.
