= Nikolai Paus =

Nikolai Bent Paus (born 21 October 1944) is a Norwegian businessman and real estate investor. He was CEO of the construction company Eeg-Henriksen (now the Norwegian part of NCC AB), Norway's third largest construction company, from 1984 to 1997. Paus was also a major shareholder in the company until all the shares were bought by its then-largest shareholder NCC. Most recently, Nikolai Paus was exposed as an intermediary of and beneficiary of the Playa Sol S.A. offshore entity incorporated in 1989 exposed in the Panama Papers

He graduated with a Master of Science degree in engineering from the Purdue University College of Engineering in 1968, and worked in the United States and Australia before joining Eeg-Henriksen in Norway in 1973. He became deputy CEO in 1983 and CEO in 1984. Eeg-Henriksen had major contracts in connection with the construction of Oslo Airport, Gardermoen in the 1990s. In 1986 Eeg-Henriksen also established a helicopter company.

Nikolai Paus has been a board member of the Norwegian Export Council and of Eckbos Legat. I 1998 he co-founded the real estate company Optimo. The company was sold to Entra in 2010.

A member of the Paus family, he is a son of the noted surgeon Bernhard Paus and of the humanitarian Brita Collett, and is a grandson of the surgeon and humanitarian Nikolai Nissen Paus. He is a cohabitant of Hermine Kristin Muhle Midelfart (née Muhle), and is the step-father of the businesswoman Celina Midelfart.
