= Hans Wangensten Paus =

Norwegian road engineer

Hans Wangensten Paus (born 26 July 1891 in Trondhjem, died 1975), often known as H.W. Paus, was a Norwegian road engineer and Director of the roads department at the Directorate of Public Roads. He is also known for authoring several works on the history of road engineering in Norway.

He studied engineering at the Norwegian Institute of Technology 1914–1919 and graduated as a civil engineer. He also became a commissioned officer in the Norwegian Army in 1916. He worked at the Norwegian Public Roads Administration for his entire career. He was an engineer in Nordland and Oppland before he was employed at the Directorate of Public Roads in 1937. In 1949, he became director of its most important department, the roads departments, and served in this position until he retired in 1961.

He was a son of the noted railway engineer captain Tollef Lintrup Paus (1843–1915), and a member of the Paus family.

H.W. Paus was also noted as an historian of road engineering in Norway, and was also interested in heraldry and genealogy.

== Honours ==
- Knight First Class of the Order of the Polar Star
- King's Medal of Merit in Gold

== Publications ==
- H.W. Paus, Norges vegdirektører og vegsjefer, 1956, second and extended edition 1962
- H.W. Paus, Militæres innsats i norsk veibygging : en historisk oversikt, in Norsk Militært Tidsskrift 10/1964
- H.W. Paus, Norges generalvegmestre : generalvegmesterperioden 1665–1824, 1966
- H.W. Paus, Norges vegbestyrere : vegbestyrerperioden 1824–1864, 1969
