= May family =

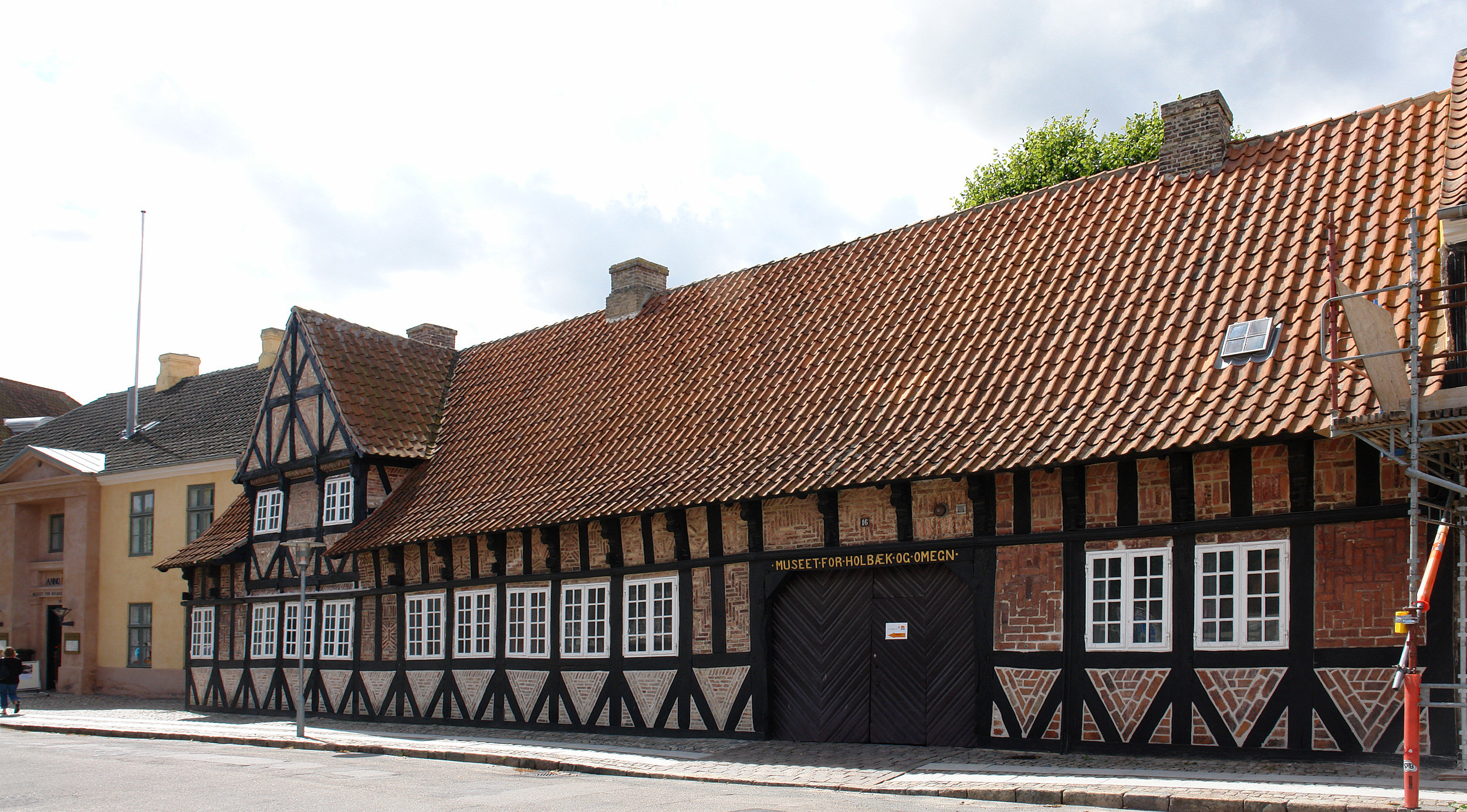
The Søren May House in Holbæk, now seat of Holbæk Museum

The May family (also spelled Maj) was a prominent Danish family that belonged to the clergy and thus the legally privileged elite in Denmark-Norway. It was descended from the priest Søren Nielsen May (died 1679), a native of then-Danish Helsingborg in Scania, and Catharina Motzfeldt, the daughter of the noble Copenhagen wine merchant Peter Motzfeldt. Catharina Motzfeldt's sister was the mother of Peder Griffenfeld, the de facto ruler of Denmark-Norway in the early 1670s, and the May family, along with Griffenfeld's other close relatives, thus rose to significant prominence with their nephew's rise to power.

Søren May and Catharina Motzfeldt had ten children. Their daughter Maren May was married to the Bishop of Christianssand Ludvig Stoud; Else May was married to the priest Poul Munkgaard; Gundel May was married to the priest Herman Arentsen, a son of Arent Berntsen; Cathrine Marie May was married to the priest Rasmus Andersen Montoppidan; Ellen May was married to the judge Poul Pedersen Fabritius; Bertel Sørensen May (died 1711) was priest in Tystrup and Haldagerlille.

The Søren May House in Holbæk, built for Søren May in 1669, is currently the seat of Holbæk Museum.
