= Olav Pauss =

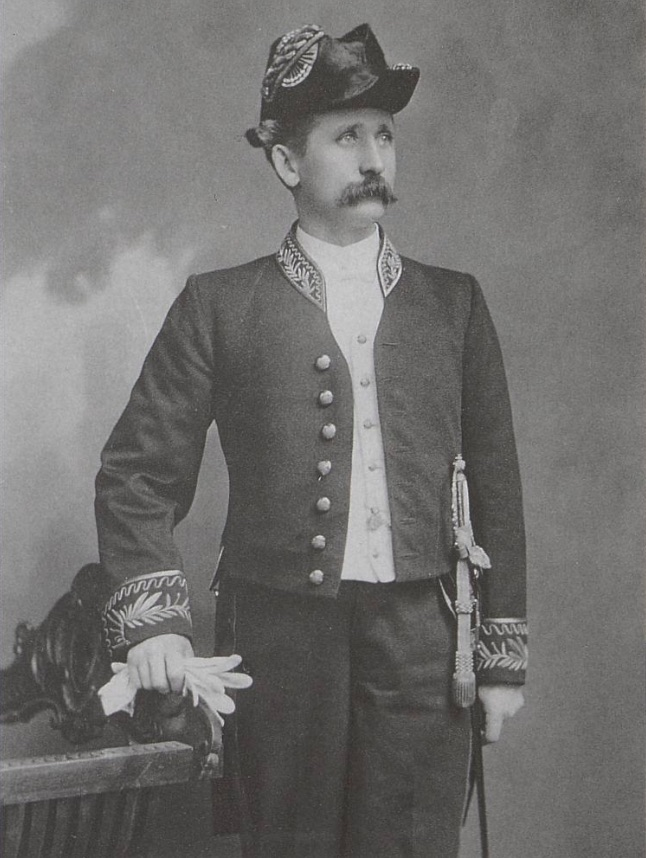
Olav Eduard Pauss, wearing the uniform as a Norwegian consul

Olav Eduard Pauss (born 20 March 1863 in Drammen, died 21 November 1928 in Sydney) was a Norwegian ship-owner, shipbroker and consul in Sydney, Australia. He served as the consul of Sweden and Norway in New South Wales and Queensland from 1902 to 1905 and as the Norwegian consul from 1905 to 1928. He also acted as Danish consul for two separate periods and as Swiss consul. At his death he was described as "one of the best known shipping men in Australia."

He was a son of ship-owner Ismar Mathias Pauss (1835–1907) of Drammen, Norway, a member of the patrician Paus family. He studied business in Germany and London, England between 1881 and 1883 and joined his father's shipping company. In 1885 he emigrated to Australia and in 1892 he established his own business as a ship-owner and shipbroker in Sydney focusing on the Scandinavian shipping industry. He became the representative of most Norwegian shipping interests in Sydney and director of several companies, including Wilh. Wilhelmsen's Australian subsidiary. He was also the representative of the Nordic Ship-Owners' Association and of Det Norske Veritas.

He founded the Norwegian Club in Sydney in 1906. He was also president of several sports societies in Sydney, involved in masonic societies and noted for philanthropic work in Sydney, for example as a supporter of the Royal Alexandra Hospital for Children. In 1919 he became a Commander of the Order of St. Olav, the Norwegian equivalent of a British knighthood, "for services as Consul.".

He married Rachel Annie Scott (born 6 July 1863 in Sydney) on 4 June 1890 in Sydney, and they had two daughters. Their daughter Olga Marian Pauss (born 1891) was married to the noted geologist William Rowan Browne and their daughter Claire Henriette Paus (born 1896) was married to the physician Alfred Alexander Heath.

He was a brother of Alf and Nicolay Nissen Paus, who founded the industrial company Paus & Paus, a nephew of the theologian Bernhard Pauss and a first cousin of Nikolai Nissen Paus, George Wegner Paus and Augustin Paus.

He lived in the villa "Norge" (Norwegian for Norway) in Neutral Bay, New South Wales.

== Honours ==
- Knight First Class (1910) and Commander (1919) of the Order of St. Olav "for services as Consul"
- Knight of the Order of the Dannebrog (1919)
- Knight First Class (1920) and Commander (1922) of the Order of the White Rose of Finland
