= Upper Telemark =

District in Telemark, Norway

Upper Telemark Øvre Telemark (Norwegian)
- District
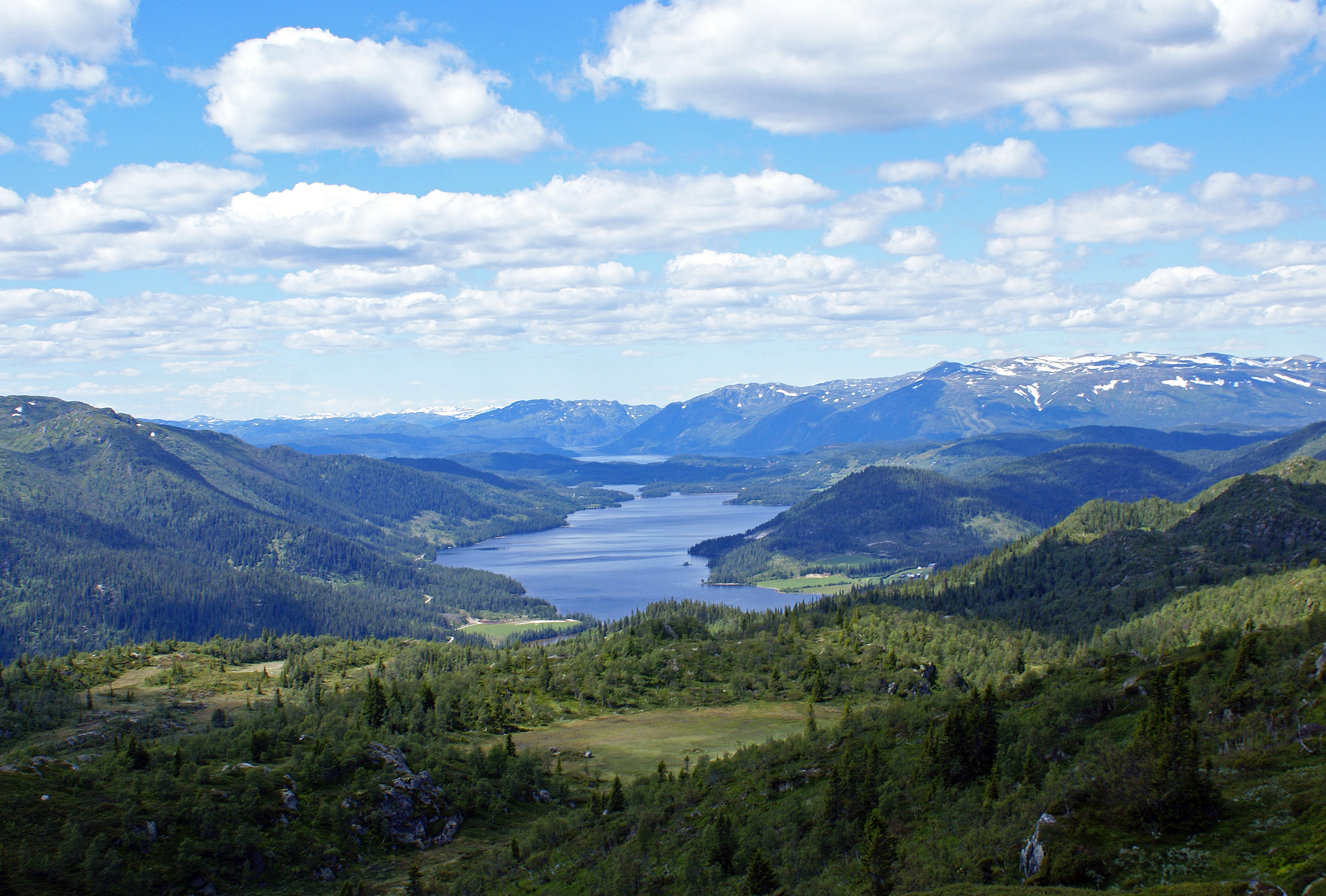
- Vinje Municipality with the Totak lake

- Note that Nome Municipality overlaps both Upper Telemark and Grenland.
- Coordinates: 59.9000°N 8.4000°E
- Country: Norway
- County: Telemark
- Region: Østlandet
- Biggest city: Notodden

Area
  - Total: 12,468 km^{2} (4,814 sq mi)

Population (2022)
  - Total: 50,984
  - Density: 4.0892/km^{2} (10.591/sq mi)
- Demonym(s): Teledøl; Telemarking

Upper Telemark (Norwegian: Øvre Telemark) is a traditional district in Telemark county in Norway. The area includes the inland areas of Telemark. More than two-thirds of the total area of Telemark—more than 10,000 square kilometres (3,900 sq mi)—belong to the traditional region of Upper Telemark. Conversely, the area of "Lower" Telemark refers to the more densely populated, flatter coastal area of Grenland and traditionally also includes Central Telemark. Upper Telemark has a varied and often scenic landscape, with many hills, mountains, valleys and lakes.

Upper Telemark was originally known simply as Telemark and is named for the Thelir (Old Norse: Þilir), the ancient North Germanic tribe that inhabited what is now called Upper Telemark and Numedal in the Migration Period and the Viking Age. Upper Telemark is known for its folk traditions within music, clothing, handcrafts, food and architecture. The region is also distinctly marked by its dialect of Norwegian.

The district is also conventionally divided into Vest-Telemark and Aust-Telemark, with Vest-Telemark consisting of Vinje, Tokke, Seljord, Fyresdal, Kviteseid, and Nissedal. Aust-Telemark always consists of Hjartdal, Notodden, and Tinn, but more recently Midt-Telemark and Nome are also usually included as well.

Whereas Lower Telemark was traditionally dominated by the burghers of the cities, Upper Telemark was for centuries dominated by a close-knit "aristocracy of officials" comprised by a handful of families which monopolized the state and church offices in the region, notably the families Paus, Blom, Ørn, and Morland.

== Etymology ==
The Old Norse form of the name was Þelamörk or Þilamörk. The first element is Þilir was the name of the inhabitants, and is assumed to be connected with Þelli (pine). The last element mörk means forest or march. The prefix Øvre means "upper".

== History ==
Traditionally, the term Telemark only referred to this area and Numedal. In 1200, the current Upper Telemark and Grenland were merged into Skiens syssel, which later became Bratsbergs amt, and then later it was renamed Telemark county. Upper Telemark also corresponds to the Øvre Telemark prosti, a deanery within the Church of Norway. Upper Telemark comprises 11 municipalities and more than 80% of Telemark, about 12,468 square kilometres (4,814 sq mi).

The border between Upper Telemark and Grenland has long been discussed among philologists. In an old travel book about the county, A.L. Coll has written that the border is defined by the mountainous cleft, that is formed by the lakes Bolkesjø, Ørvella, Øverbø-moen, Seljordsvatnet, Flåvatn, and Fjågesund or Bjårvatn.

== Media gallery ==
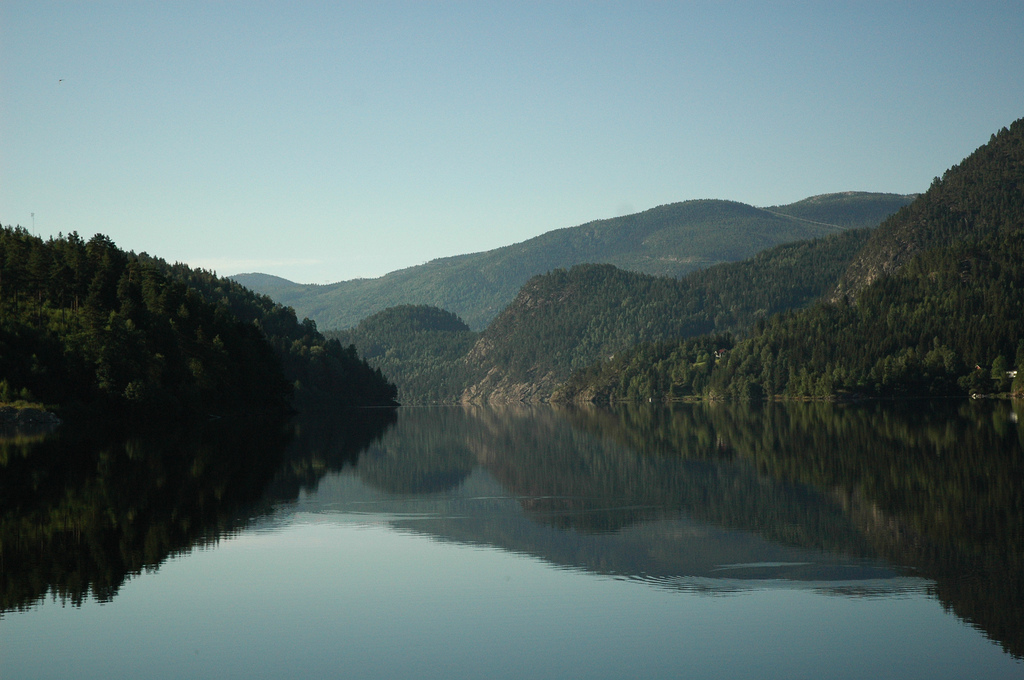
Kviteseidvatnet in Kviteseid Municipality

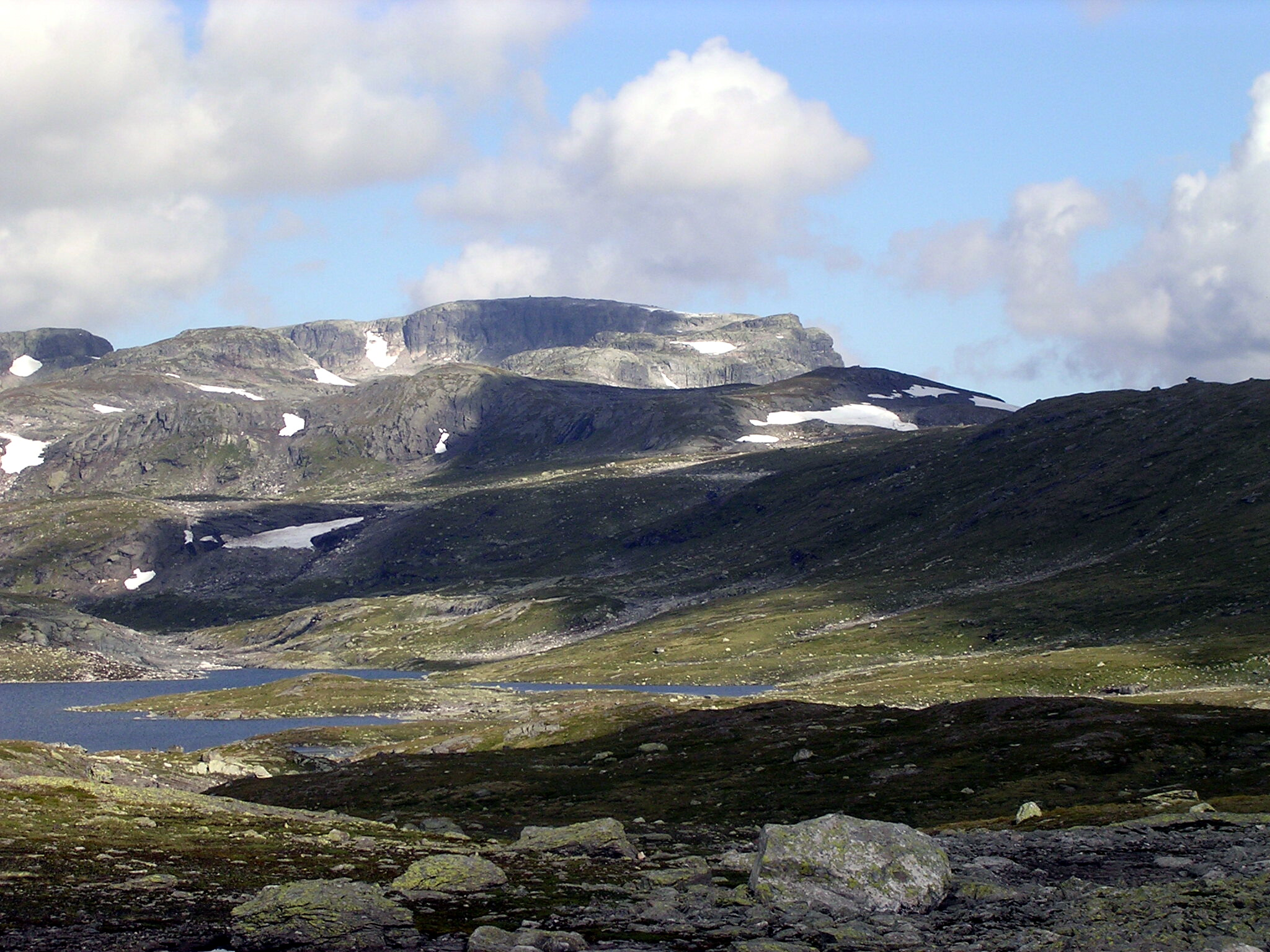
Sandfloegga seen from Holmasjøen in Vinje Municipality

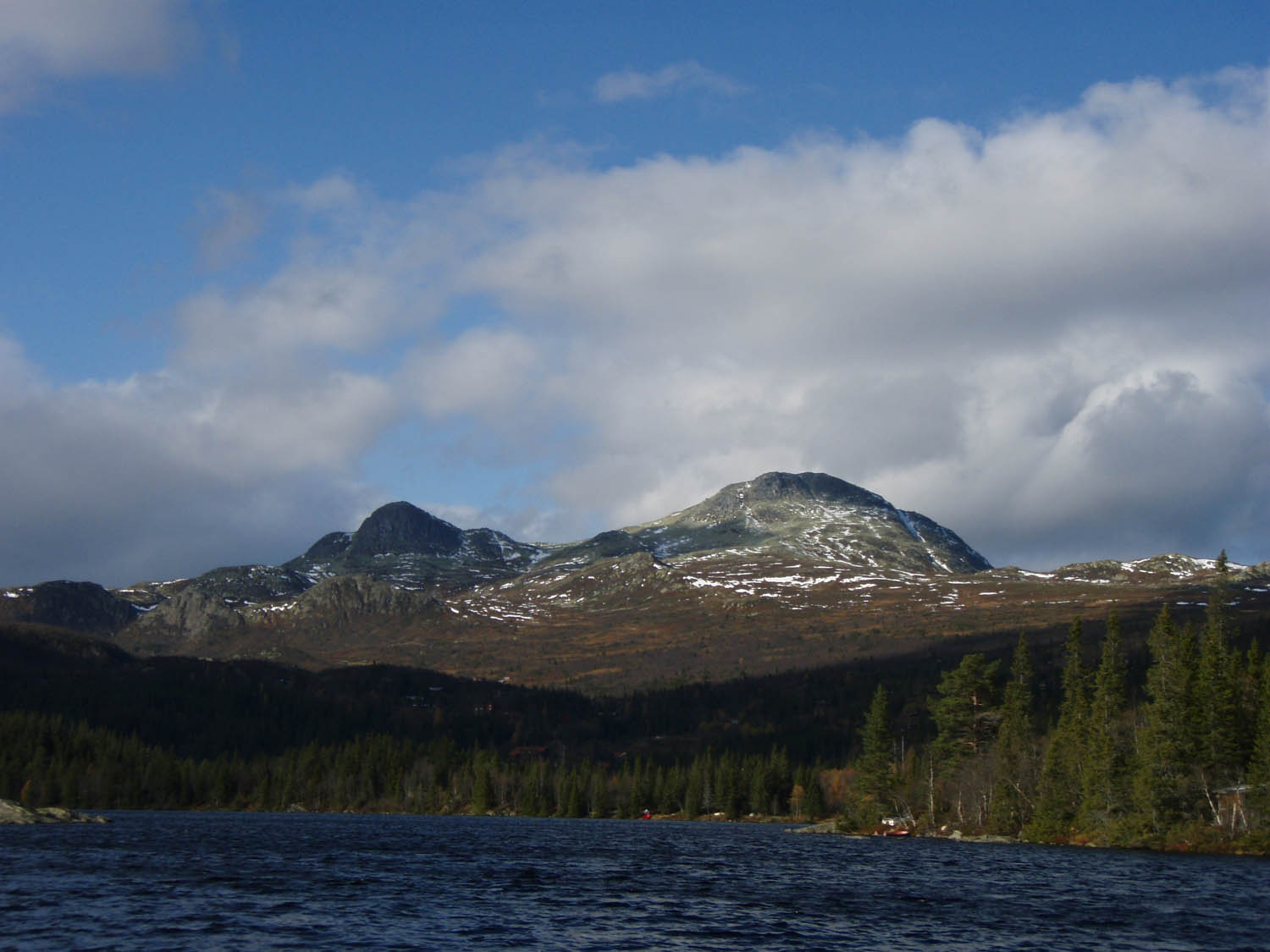
Tuddal in Hjartdal Municipality

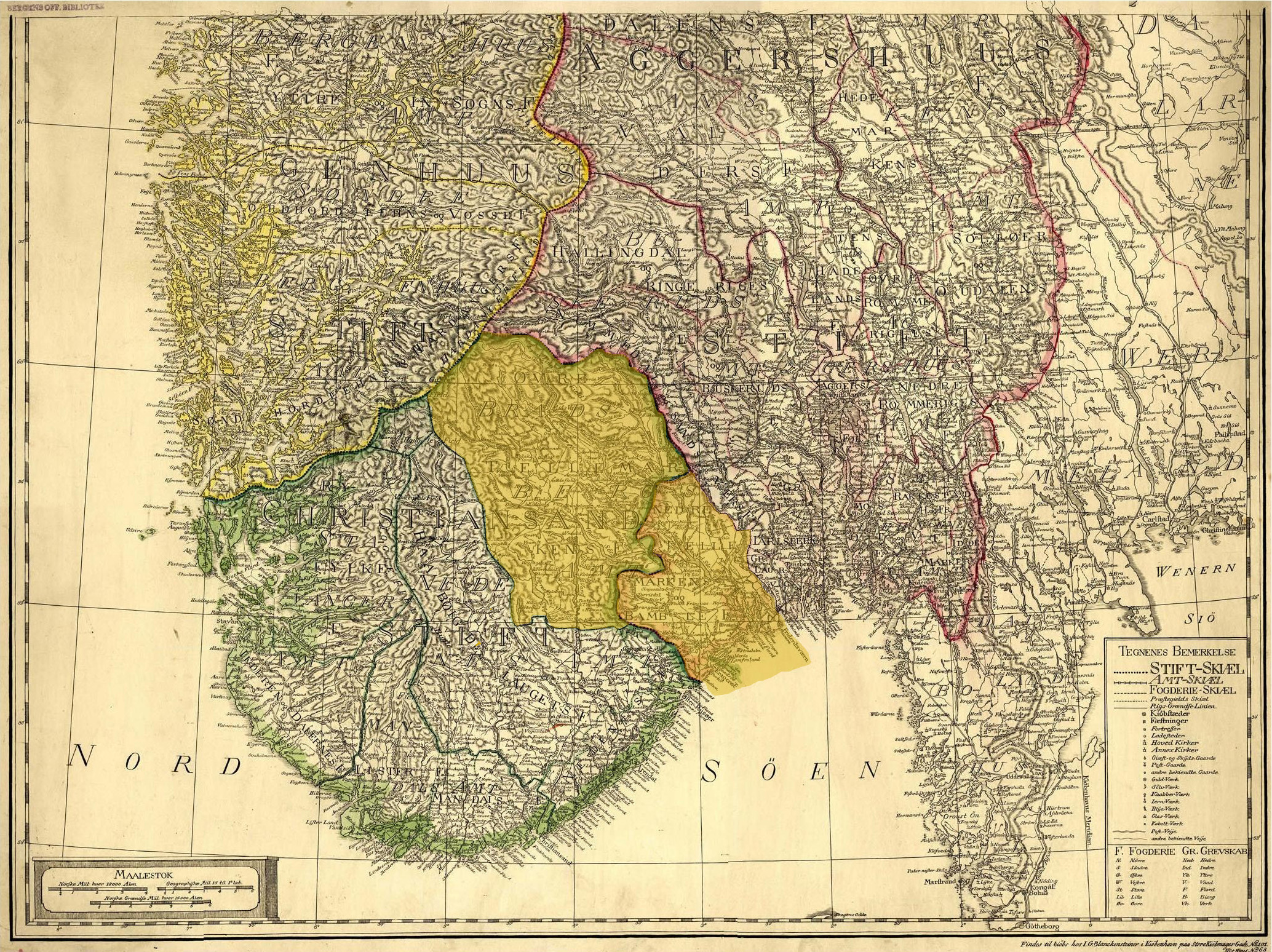
Bratsberg amt with Upper and Lower Telemark

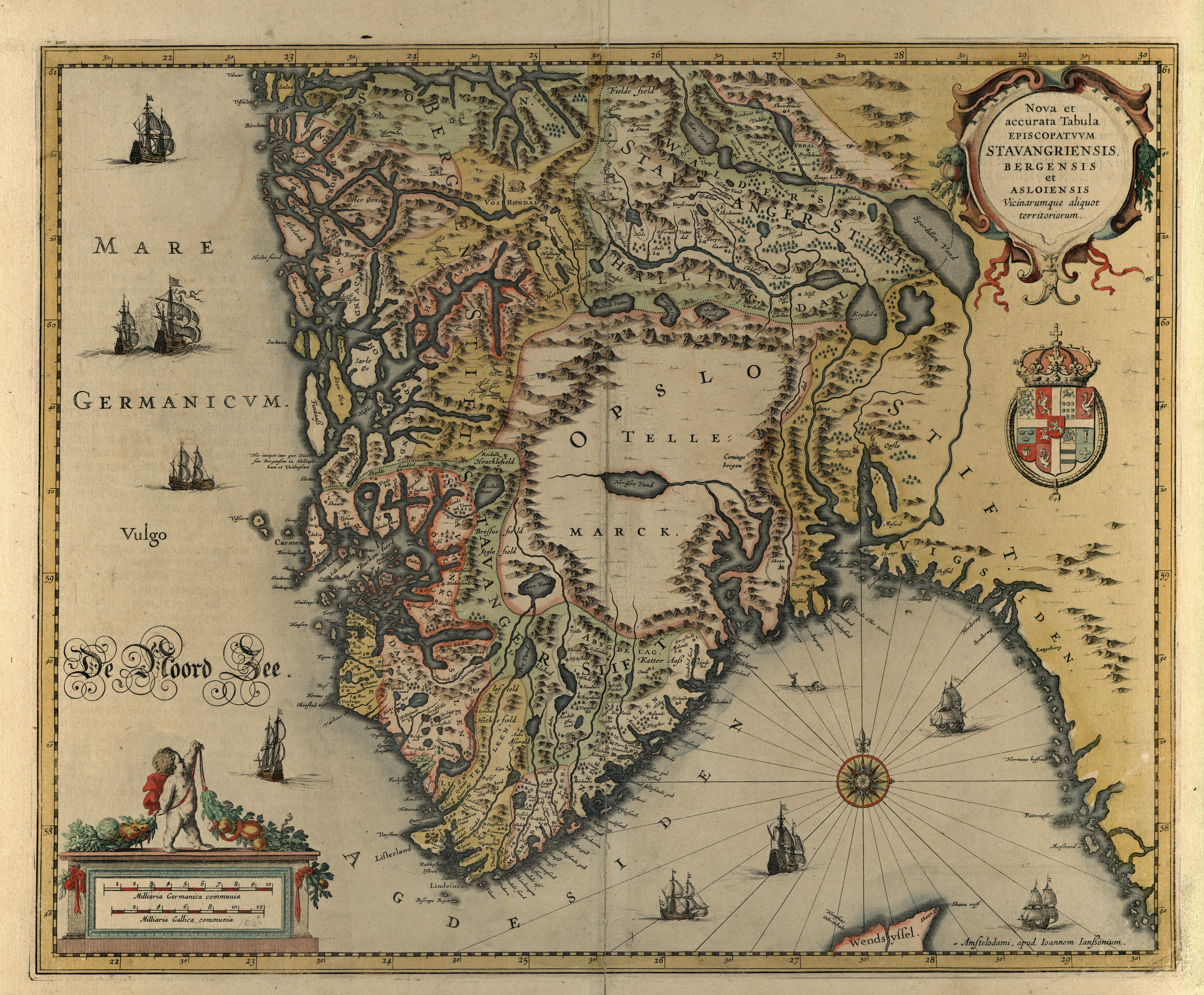
A 1636 map of southern Norway shows (Upper) Telemark as a mostly white field
