= Blom (family from Skien) =

Blom is a Norwegian family descended from Jan Fredriksen (died 1624), a citizen of Skien. His son, parish priest Fredrik Blom (died 1657), Lårdal, adopted the family name Blom. According to playwright Henrik Ibsen, the family was one of the patrician families in Skien. The family is related through marriage to families such as Cappelen, Løvenskiold, Paus and Aall.

The family adopted its coat of arms, featuring a sighthound, in the early 19th century. The coat of arms is loosely based on coats of arms of other families with similar names, not known to be related to this family.

== Family members ==
Some of the well-known family members include

- Christopher Fredriksen Blom (died 1735), Lårdal, forest owner
- Jens Christophersen Blom (1708‑84), married Susanne Paus, a granddaughter of Hans Paus
- Hans Jensen Blom (died 1808), Skien, son of Jens Christophersen Blom and Susanne Paus, ship's captain, shipowner and timber merchant, married Martha Paus (sister of Ole Paus)
- Hans Christophersen Blom (died 1814), Skien, merchant and shipowner
- Andreas Rougtvedt Blom (died 1851), Skien, ship's captain, shipowner, owner of Lagmannsgården in Skien
- Hans Jensen Blom (died 1875), Tysvær, provost and Member of Parliament
- Christine Johanne Blom, Skien, married cabinet minister Niels Aall
- Marie Severine Blom, Skien, married Didrich von Cappelen (died 1828), member of the Eidsvoll assembly in 1814
- Christopher Hansen Blom (died 1879), Skien, shipowner, timber merchant, owner of Bratsberg gård, married Marie Elisabeth née Cappelen (died 1834)
- Søren Martinus Blom (died 1874), Brevik, judge
- Diderik Cappelen Blom (died 1894), Skien, owner of Bratsberg gård
- Bendix Christian Blom (died 1928), Oslo, provost
- Dorothea Christine Blom, Oslo, married Harald Løvenskiold (died 1934), Vækerø

The descendants of the family through female lines include

- Henrik Ibsen (through his grandmother Hedevig Paus' grandmother Martha Christophersdatter Blom)

Some descendants of the family have Blom as a middle name, such as

- Hans Blom Cappelen (1803–1846)
- Christopher Blom Paus (1810–1898)
- Christopher Blom Paus (1878–1959)
