= Paus & Paus =

Norwegian manufacturing company

Paus & Paus AS was a former industrial company in Norway, active in the pulp and paper industry, chemical industry and pharmaceutical industry. It existed from 1906 to 2001 when it was acquired by Pemco. A number of former subsidiary companies still exist. For many years, it was one of the larger pulp and paper companies in eastern Norway.

The company was founded by Alf Paus (1869–1945) and Georg F. Helmer and initially named Helmer & Paus in 1906. Three years later, Helmer left the company, and Alf Paus' brother, Nicolay (Nissen) Paus, became the new partner, leading to the renaming of the company as Paus & Paus. In 1914, its headquarters relocated to Christiania, and it became a limited company in 1918. In 1920, Alf and Nicolay Paus acquired nearly all the shares of the factory Den Norske Papirfiltfabrik in Drammen, which subsequently became a subsidiary of Paus & Paus.
