= Nikolas Sigurdsson Paus =

Nikolas Sigurdsson Paus (mentioned 1329–1347) was a Norwegian nobleman who served as the Lawspeaker of Oslo shortly before the Black Death.

He is mentioned in written sources in medieval Oslo between 1329 and 1347, and as lawspeaker in 1347, two years before the Black Death reached the city. He was probably born in the late 13th century. Two seals used by Nikolas Paus are included in the Encyclopedia of Noble Families in Denmark, Norway and the Duchies (published 1782–1813).

He was usually known by his cognomen Paus, but his patronymic Sigurdsson is also used in some sources. Both he and other individuals named Paus (with different spellings) owned substantial land in Nes near Oslo during the 14th and 15th centuries, but their exact relations are not known. Medieval historians P.A. Munch, Alexander Bugge and Edvard Bull argued, on the basis of the Low German-sounding name, that Nikolas Paus' family was of Low German origin and wrote that the family was an influential immigrant family in medieval Oslo; the family may have immigrated as merchants in the 12th or 13th century. According to Munch, Bugge and Bull, the farm Pausinn, one of the "city farms" of medieval Oslo that is mentioned in written sources between 1324 and 1482, was probably named after Nikolas Paus or a member of his family.
