= Sovereignty Act =

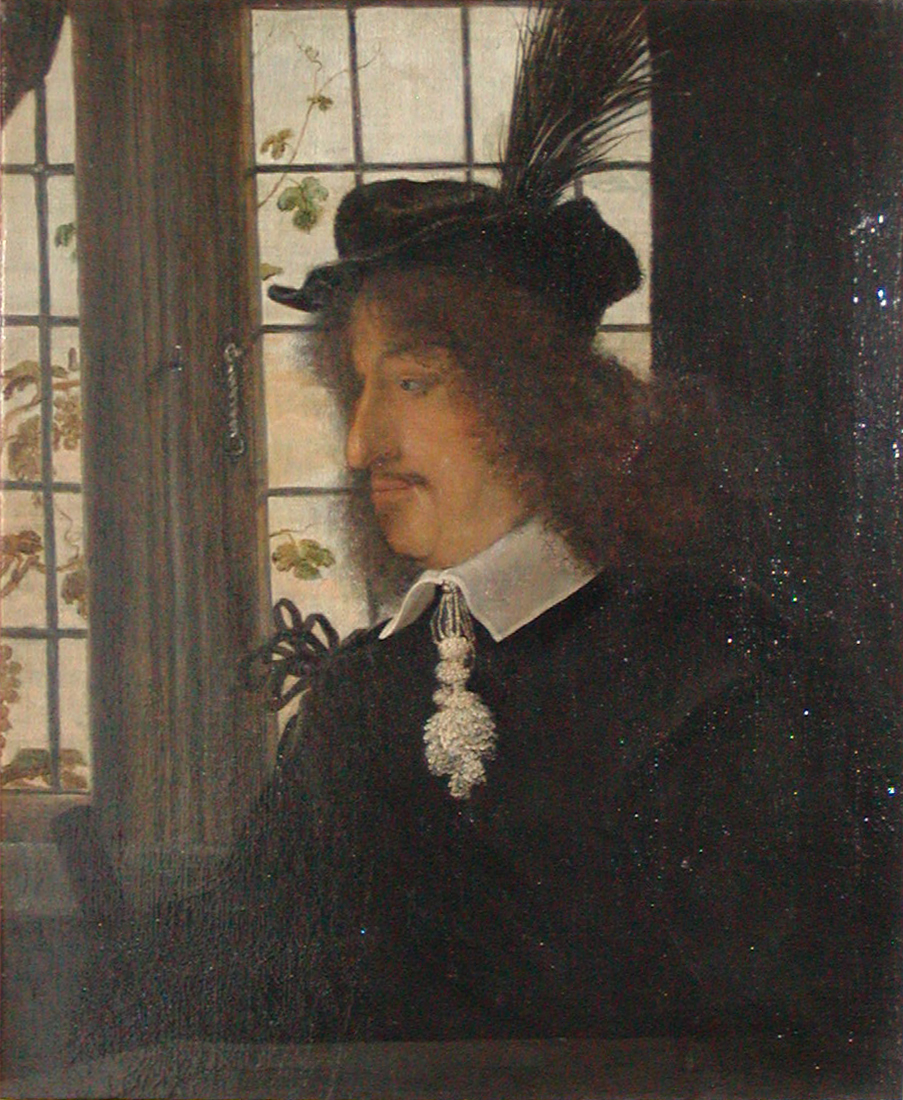
Frederick III of Denmark and Norway

The Sovereignty Act or the Absolute and Hereditary Monarchy Act (Danish: Suverænitetsakten or Enevoldsarveregeringsakten; Norwegian: Enevoldsarveregjeringsakten or sometimes Suverenitetsakten) refers to two similar constitutional acts that introduced absolute and hereditary monarchy in the Kingdom of Denmark and absolute monarchy in the Kingdom of Norway, which was already a hereditary monarchy.

The Danish version was signed on 10 January 1661, by the representatives of the estates of the realm, i.e. nobility, clergy, and burghers. In Norway, which included the Faroe Islands, Greenland, and Iceland, the act was signed on 7 August 1661, by nobility, clergy, burghers, and farmers.

The acts gave the King absolute sovereignty (hence the name) and were signed following a coup d'etat by Frederick III of Denmark and Norway in October 1660, which abolished the Danish Council of the Realm, electoral capitulation and Elective monarchy, ending the political influence of the nobility and clergy. This was made possible partly because the Council of the Realm, and thus the nobility, had lost control over the Army during the Second Northern War in the years before, and the King could now use the army with its German officers and enlisted troops to intimidate the Danish nobility into accepting the constitutional changes.

The Sovereignty Act was replaced by the King's Law or Lex Regia (Danish and Norwegian: Kongeloven) in both kingdoms in 1665, which formed the constitution of Denmark and Norway until 1848 and 1814, respectively. It was unprecedented in giving the King unlimited power.

== See also ==
- 1660 state of emergency in Denmark

== Literature ==
- Allan Tønnesen (ed.), Magtens besegling, Enevoldsarveregeringsakterne af 1661 og 1662 underskrevet og beseglet af stænderne i Danmark, Norge, Island og Færøerne, University Press of Southern Denmark, 2013, 583 pages, ISBN 9788776746612
