= Hans Krag (writer) =

Norwegian writer, publisher and translator

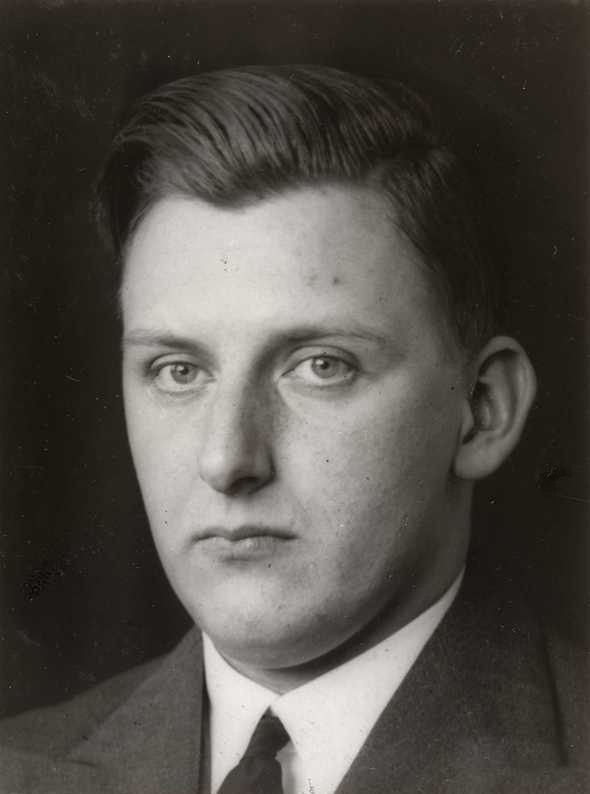
Hans Krag

Hans Krag (born 14 December 1904 in Christiania, Oslo, died 27 January 1984 in Søgne) was a Norwegian writer, publisher and translator, and known for his works on heraldry.

He was the son of the novelist Thomas Krag, his Danish mother, Iben Nielsen, was a poet, his brother was the literary historian Erik Krag and his son is the historian Claus Krag. He had a business career that extended to cattle breeding in Argentina. He founded a publishing company, Krag & Støle A/S.

His works include the book Norsk heraldisk mønstring fra Frederik IV's regjeringstid 1699–1730, with Norwegian arms from the reign of Frederick IV. He wrote articles in Heraldisk Tidsskrift, of which he was on the editorial board from 1960 until his death in 1984. He was the first Norwegian member of L'Académie Internationale d'Héraldique. He also published works on genealogy and translations from Lin Yutang and Thackeray's satire The Book of Snobs.
