= Alexander Bugge =

Norwegian historian (1870–1929)

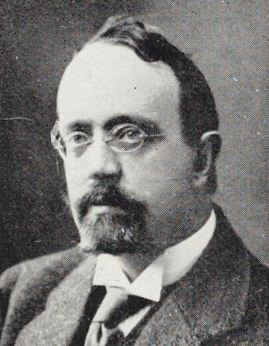

Alexander Bugge (30 December 1870, Christiania – 24 December 1929, Copenhagen) was a Norwegian historian. He was professor at the Royal Frederick University from 1903–1912, and his main fields of interest were culture and society in the Viking Age and the development of trade and cities in Norway during the Middle Ages.

== Personal life ==
Alexander Bugge was the son of the Norwegian philologist and historian Sophus Bugge and Karen Sophie, née Schreiner. On 16 December 1903 he married Marie Magdalene Graff.

== Career ==
In the biography written for Norsk biografisk leksikon, Claus Krag described Bugge as having "an open and restlessly seeking mind", a trait he shared with his father, who according to Krag was "one of the few genuine scholars of genius in Norwegian science". After passing his university exams in language and history in 1894, Bugge obtained a university scholarship the following year. In 1898, at the age of 28, he became a member of the Norwegian Academy of Science and Letters. In 1899 he published his thesis Studier over de norske byers selvstyre og handel før Hanseaternes tid ("Studies Concerning the Norwegian Cities' Autonomy and Trade Before the Time of the Hanseatic League"), and obtained his dr.philos. degree.

Bugge won an essay competition sponsored by the Nansen Foundation in 1903 on the question "How or to which extend have the Norse, and particularly the Norwegians, culture, way of living and society been influenced from the Western Countries [i.e. the British Isles]". During his work with this he learned the Irish language and did extensive studies of archives in Dublin and London.

Bugge succeeded Gustav Storm as professor of history at the Royal Frederick University in the summer of 1903. He published numerous scientific articles, his main sources being the early development of Norwegian cities and trade as well the cultural relations in the time of the Vikings. He also edited and translated into English the complex Irish tract Caithréim Chellacháin Chaisil (The Victorious Career of Cellachán of Cashel), published in 1905. In addition to these scholarly works, he also contributed several popularl- adapted works on history, such as his two volume work Vikingerne ("The Vikings") from 1905–06 and part of Aschehoug's Norges historie ("History of Norway"), published 1910–12 concerning the time before the Battle of Stiklestad in 1030.

Despite recognition as an excellent scholar and popular author, Bugge was not comfortable with his work as professor. According to Halvdan Koht, "being a teacher cost him [Bugge] unspeakable hardships... ...in the end making him sick". (Note: Full quote in Norwegian: "Det kosta han eit useieleg strev å vere lærar, han kunde ikkje sleppe seg laus og gje seg fritt og friskt inn i arbeide med studentane, katetre vart beint fram ein redsel for han, så han til slutt vart reint sjuk") According to Claus Krag, he also suffered periods of serious problems related to alcohol. Bugge resigned his professorship in 1912.

He remained a scholar and writer, giving lectures and publishing popular works on Norwegian history. Among other works, he published Illustreret verdenshistorie for hjemmet ("Illustrated World History for the Home"), in 9 volumes with more than 4000 pages, in the period 1920–29.

Bugge was killed in an accident in Copenhagen on Christmas Eve 1929, at the age of 59 years.

== Selected works ==
- Vikingerne (1905–06)
- "Bidrag til det sidste Afsnit af Nordboernes Historie i Irland", in Aarbøger for nordisk oldkyndighed og historie, II. (Kongelige Nordiske oldskrift-selskab). Copenhagen: H. H. Thirles Bogtrykkeri. (1904) pp. 248–315
- Duald Mac Firbis, On the Fomorians and the Norsemen. Christiania: J. Chr. Gundersens Bogtrykkeri. (1905)
- Caithreim Cellachain Caisil. Christiania: J. Chr. Gundersens Bogtrykkeri. (1905)
- Norges historie fremstillet for det norske folk (1909–16)
- Der Untergang der norwegischen Schiffart im Mittelalter (1914)
- Vierteljahrschrift für Sozial- und Wirtschaftsgeschichte (1914)
- Den norske sjøfarts historie (1923)
- Den norske trælasthandels historie (1925–28)
- Illustreret verdenshistorie for hjemmet (1920-29)
