= Arent Berntsen =

Norwegian statistician (1610–1680)

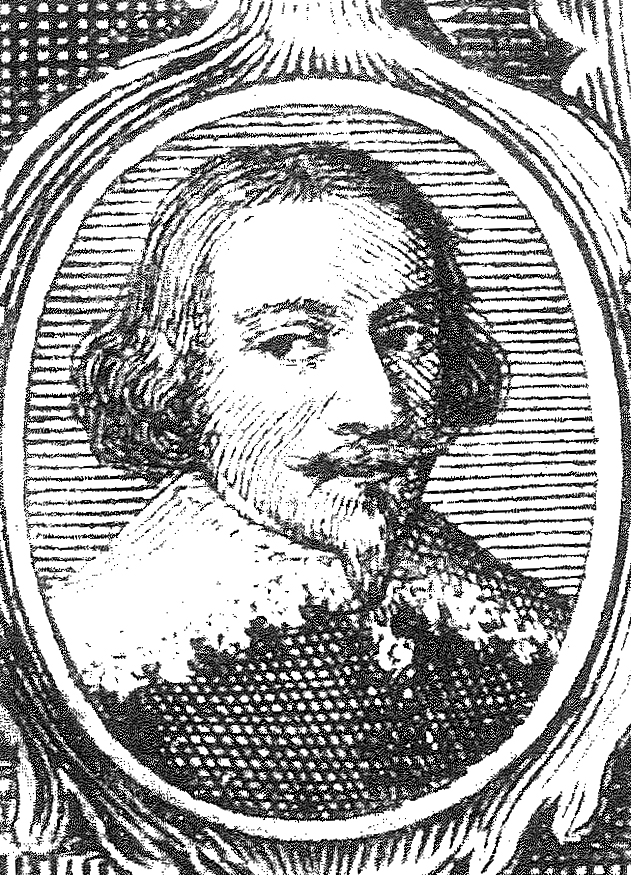
- Arent Berntsen, portrait on the cover of Danmarckis oc Norgis Fructbar Herlighed (1656)
- Born: 12 May 1610; Bergen
- Died: 29 December 1680 (aged 70)
- Occupations: Topographical-statistical author; businessman; banker; estate owner; councillor in Copenhagen

Arent Berntsen (12 May 1610 in Bergen – 29 December 1680 in Copenhagen; also spelled Arennt Berntsen) was a Dano-Norwegian topographical-statistical author, businessman, banker, estate owner and councillor in Copenhagen. He is most widely known for his monumental 1656 work Danmarckis oc Norgis Fructbar Herlighed, one of the primary sources of information relating to Denmark-Norway in the 17th century.

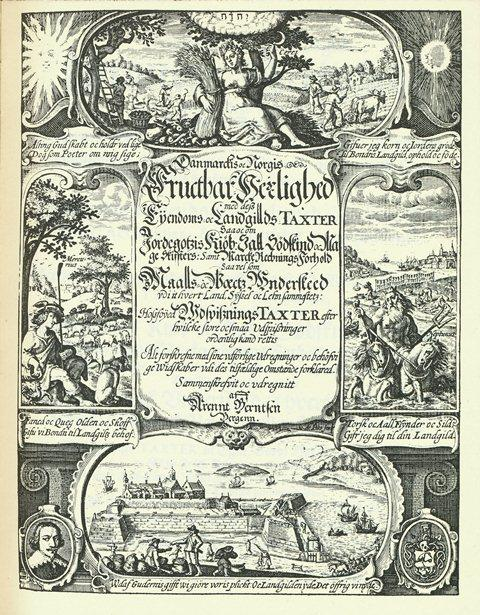
Danmarckis oc Norgis Fructbar Herlighed
