= Kiær =

Kiaer or Kiær may refer to:

- Anders Nicolai Kiær (1838-1919), a Norwegian statistician
- Benedikte Kiær (born 1969), a Danish politician
- Dakky Kiær (1892–1980), a Norwegian politician
- Elias C. Kiær (1827–1911), a Norwegian businessperson
- Hans Kiær (1795–1867), a Norwegian politician
- Ian Kiaer (born 1971), an artist based in London
- Johan Aschehoug Kiær (1869–1931), a Norwegian paleontologist and geologist
- Nicolai Kiær (1888–1934), a Norwegian gymnast
- Rolf Kiær (1897–1975), a Norwegian hydrographer
- Thorry Kiær (1888–1968), a Norwegian industrialist
