= Olympia Paus =

Shipping heiress and businesswoman (born 1976)

- Born: November 11, 1976 (age 49); Piraeus, Greece
- Citizenship: Norwegian
- Education: Marlborough College
- Occupations: Shipping magnate, equestrian
- Spouse: Alexander Nix
- Children: 3
- Relatives: Pontine Paus (sister)

Caroline Victoria Olympia Paus (born 11 November 1976), known as just Olympia Paus (pronounced [ʊˈlʏ̀mpɪɑ ˈpæʉs]), is a Norwegian shipping magnate and equestrienne, who lives in the United Kingdom. She is married to Alexander Nix, former CEO of Cambridge Analytica.

Born in Greece to Norwegian parents who moved to London when she was three, she was raised in Holland Park and has been a permanent resident of the United Kingdom since 1979. On her mother's side she is a member of the billionaire Wilhelmsen family, Norway's wealthiest family during most of the 20th century. She is one of the largest shareholders of Wilh. Wilhelmsen, one of the world's largest shipping companies with 21,000 employees, and is a director of Taurus, one of the principal holding companies that control the Wilhelmsen company. She also has substantial interests in other companies. A competitive equestrian since her youth, she is an active polo player, who competes in the Royal County of Berkshire Polo Club and the Guards Polo Club, both of which are considered to be among the world's leading polo clubs.

In 2020 she and six female relatives who combined own around 60% of the family's stake in the Wilhelmsen company launched a battle for control over the company, and offered their cousin, Wilhelmsen CEO Thomas Wilhelmsen, $353 million for his shares in a bid to oust him from the company and assume control of it themselves; they argued that the company has a patriarchal ownership structure that denies women influence. Her cousin has rejected their offer and disputed the claim that the company has a patriarchal structure. The family fortune is estimated at nearly $2 billion.

== Biography ==
=== Childhood and family ===
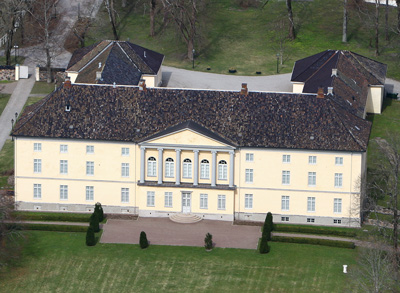
Jarlsberg Manor, owned by her grandmother's family Wedel-Jarlsberg; Olympia Paus is descended from the statesman and viceroy Herman Wedel Jarlsberg

She was born in the port town of Piraeus in the Athens urban area in Greece to Norwegian parents Christopher Paus (b. 1943) and Cecilie Paus (née Wilhelmsen; b. 1943). Her parents moved to Greece immediately after their wedding in 1972 when her father became an executive with Citibank's shipping division in Greece; in 1979 the family moved to London where Christopher Paus was a vice president with Citibank before becoming an independent investor in the shipping and petroleum industry through his company Pausco with offices in London and Oslo. Her father was reported in 2007 to own shares in Scorpion Offshore worth 80 million euro, and the family also owns shares in other companies and in real estate. Her mother Cecilie Paus is a member of one of Norway's wealthiest families, the billionaire Wilhelmsen family, and became one of the main owners of Wilh. Wilhelmsen together with her siblings on the death of their father, shipping magnate Tom Wilhelmsen, in 1978.

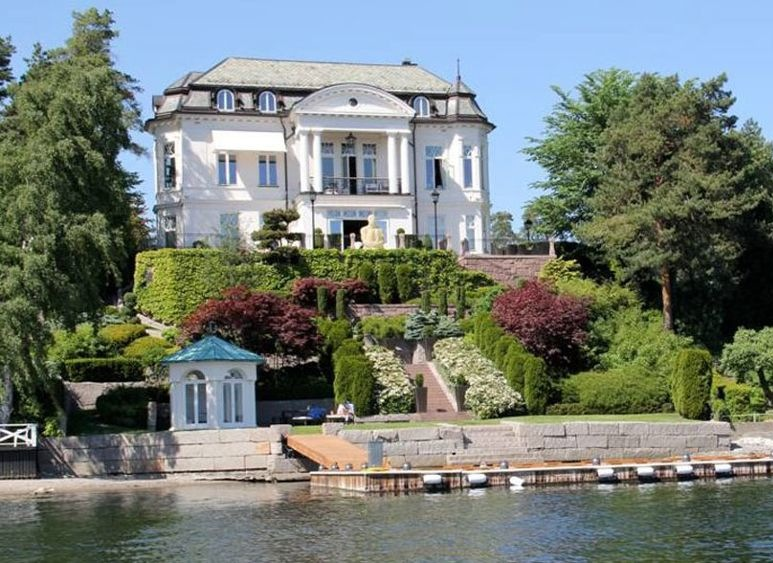
Villa Paus in Bygdøy, Oslo was built for Olympia Paus' family in 1907 and is now the home of billionaire Petter Stordalen.

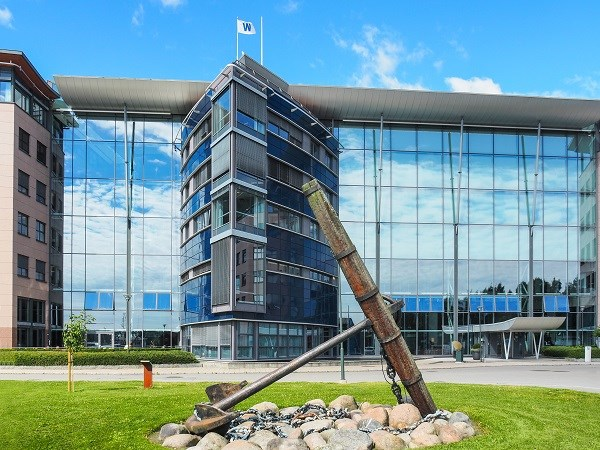
Headquarters of Wilh. Wilhelmsen; Olympia Paus is one of the company's largest shareholders and a director of its holding company Taurus

Through her great-grandfather Peder Anker Wedel-Jarlsberg, the Lord Chamberlain (head of the royal court) and close confidant of King Haakon VII, Olympia Paus descends from the statesman and viceroy Herman Wedel Jarlsberg. Her family had close ties to the royal family during the reign of Haakon VII. Among her other ancestors are industrialists Einar Westye Egeberg and Halvor Schou.

Olympia Paus spent her first three years in Greece and has lived in London ever since; she grew up in the Holland Park area of Kensington where she still lives. She attended Clifton College in Bristol and Marlborough College, a boarding school in Wiltshire. Although she is a Norwegian citizen born to two Norwegian parents she has never lived in Norway; as a permanent resident of the United Kingdom since 1979 she has the right to apply for British citizenship, but has not done so.

=== Horseriding ===
She has been involved in competitive horseriding since her youth. She is an active polo player, who competes in the Royal County of Berkshire Polo Club and the Guards Polo Club, both of which are considered to be among the world's leading polo clubs.

=== Wilh. Wilhelmsen and ownership feud ===
She is one of the largest shareholders of Wilh. Wilhelmsen, Norway's largest shipping company; her family combined owns over 60% of the company's shares and additionally several hundred million USD in other companies. The total family fortune is estimated at nearly $2 billion. She is a director of AS Taurus, one of the principal holding companies that control Wilh. Wilhelmsen. Her mother Cecilie Paus née Wilhelmsen, one of the Wilhelmsen company's main shareholders since 1978, transferred all her shares to Olympia and her sister Pontine Paus, who thus became two of the company's largest shareholders alongside their cousin Thomas Wilhelmsen.

Together with other family members she was also a major shareholder of Scorpion Offshore, where her father Christopher Paus was the largest shareholder, until it was bought by John Fredriksen's Seadrill in 2010.

In 2020 she, her sister and five other female relatives (four cousins and an aunt) who combined own around 60% of the Wilhelmsen family's stake in the family's companies launched a battle for control over the Wilhelmsen family's main holding company, due to the fact that her cousin, Wilhelmsen CEO Thomas Wilhelmsen, holds the only vote in the company although the female family members own the majority of the shares; they said that the company has a patriarchal ownership structure that deprives women of control, and questioned its legitimacy. In September 2020 Olympia Paus, on behalf of the female relatives, offered their cousin and nephew Thomas Wilhelmsen $353 million for his shares in the family company in a bid to buy him out, on the condition that he leaves the company entirely and resigns as CEO. Thomas Wilhelmsen has disputed that the company has a patriarchal ownership structure and rejected the buyout offer from the female relatives.

== Personal life ==
Olympia Paus' engagement to Alexander Nix was announced in 2010. They bought a home in central London for £4.5 million in 2012. The couple has three children. Her sister is the designer Pontine Paus.
