= Ole Paus (disambiguation) =

Ole Paus (1947–2023) was a Norwegian singer-songwriter, author, poet and actor.

Ole Paus may also refer to:

- Ole Paus (shipowner) (1776–1855), Norwegian ship's captain, shipowner and land owner
- Ole Paus (businessman) (1846–1931), Norwegian businessman, factory owner and banker
  - Ole Paus (company), a Norwegian iron and steel wholesale company, founded by the businessman
- Ole Paus (general) (1910–2003), Norwegian general, diplomat and NATO official; father of singer-songwriter Ole Paus
