= Per Paus =

Norwegian steel industrialist and lawyer

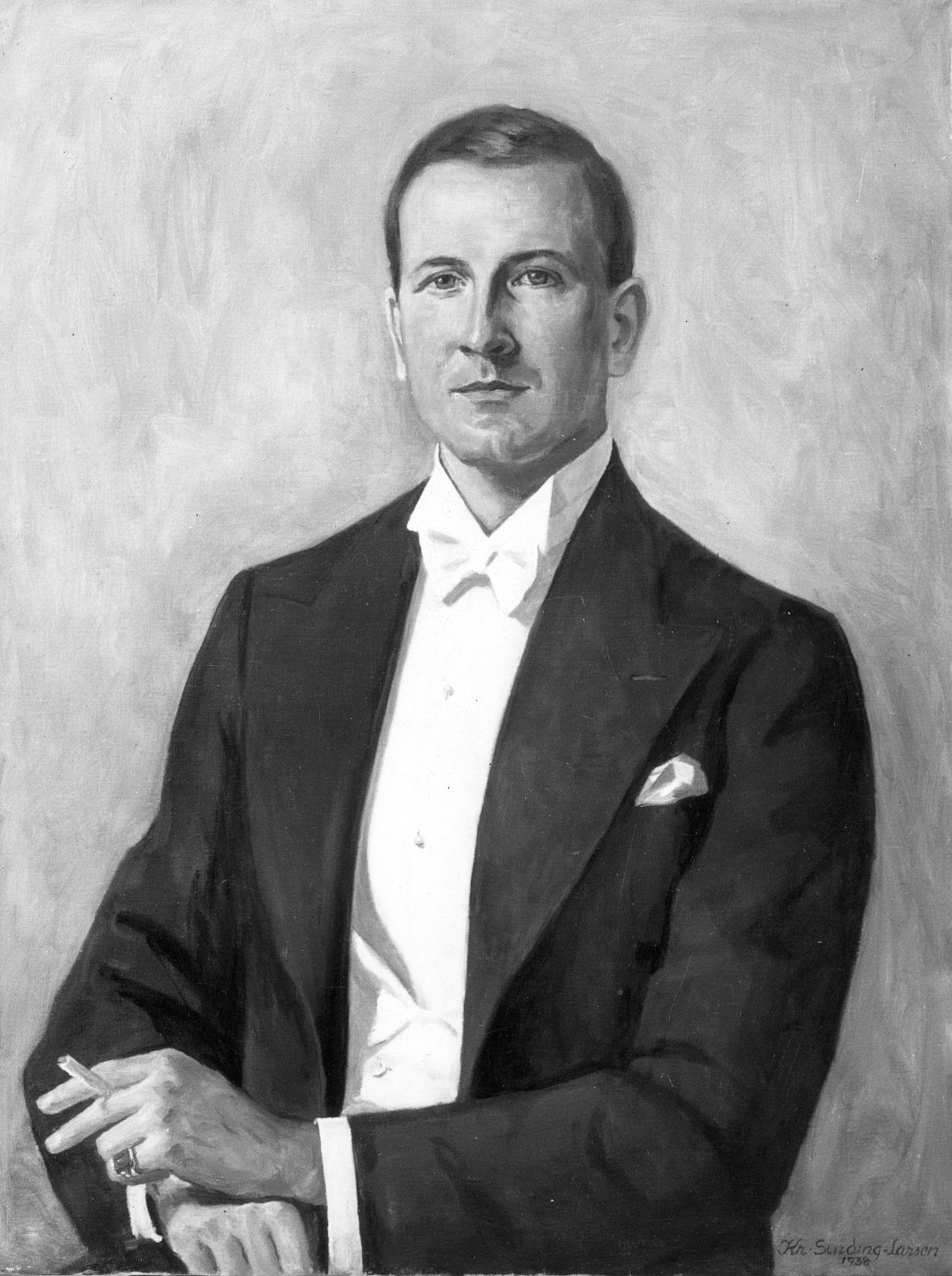
Per Paus

Per Christian Cornelius Paus (born 28 April 1910 in Oslo, died 15 December 1986) was a Norwegian steel industrialist and lawyer.

== Background ==
He was a member of the patrician Paus family and was a son of the steel industrialist Christopher Blom Paus and a grandson of the steel industrialist Ole Paus, who founded the Ole Paus steel company in 1872. In 1937 Per Paus married Countess Hedevig Wedel-Jarlsberg, a daughter of Lord Chamberlain Peder Anker Wedel-Jarlsberg. They acquired the estate Esviken from her parents in 1948; Esviken had been the summer residence of the Wedel-Jarlsberg family and King Haakon VII often visited there in his father-in-law's lifetime.

Per and Hedevig Paus were the parents of Cornelia Paus, ship-owner and investor Christopher Paus, and oil and gas investor Peder Paus. Cecilie Paus, one of the main owners of Wilh. Wilhelmsen since 1978, is their daughter-in-law. The designer Pontine Paus is their granddaughter.

== Career ==
Per Paus was educated as lawyer and graduated with the cand.jur. (LL.M.) degree at the Royal Frederick University in 1934. He also studied French at the University of Paris.

He was employed by the Appleby-Frodingham Steel Company in England from 1936 and joined his family's company Ole Paus as a partner in 1939. He succeeded his father as managing director and sole owner in 1951.

He was a board member of the Steel Wholesalers' Association and a member of the council of Oslo City Museum.
