= Ole Paus (businessman) =

Norwegian iron and steel industrialist

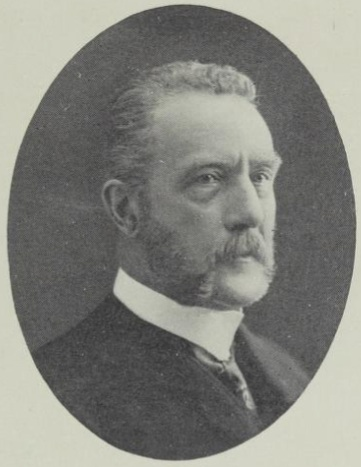
- Born: 24 October 1846; Skien
- Died: 20 March 1931 (aged 84); Bygdøy

Ole Paus (24 October 1846 in Skien – 20 March 1931 at Bygdøy, Aker) was a Norwegian iron and steel industrialist and chairman of the commercial bank Den norske Creditbank (now DNB ASA). He was a first cousin of Henrik Ibsen.

== Career ==
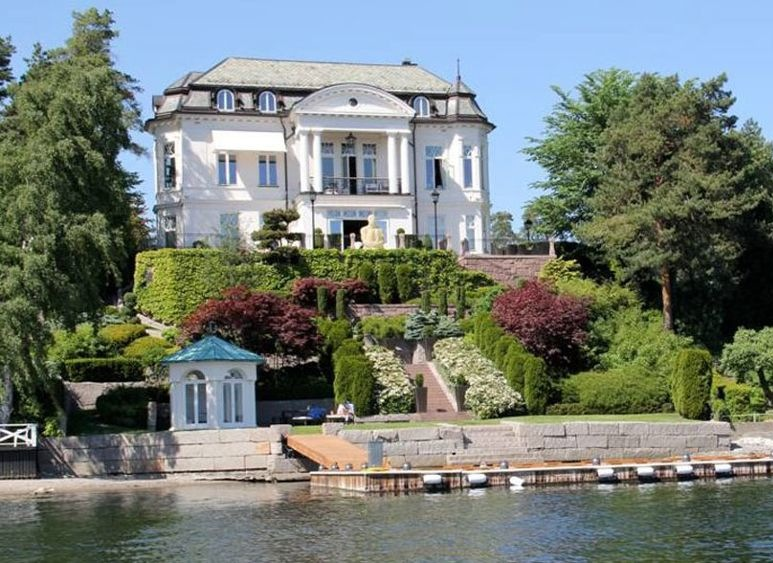
Villa Paus at Bygdøy, built for Ole Paus in 1907, and where he died in 1931

He attended the Latin School in his native Skien and studied in Lübeck. He lived for several years in Germany and the United Kingdom, until he settled in Bygdøy, Aker.

He founded the iron and steel wholesale company Ole Paus in 1872 and the factory A/S Den norske Hesteskosømfabrik in 1883. He was chairman of the Norwegian Iron Industry Association from 1910 to 1918. He was a member of the Board of Directors of Den norske Creditbank, one of Norway's leading commercial banks, from 1897, and became the bank's Chairman in 1903. He was also elected as a member of the Christiania city council, was a board member of Christiania Handelsstands Forening, chairman of the supervisory board of the leading conservative newspaper Morgenbladet, a member of the Council of Fifty (consisting of Oslo's 50 leading businessmen) and a member of the supervisory board of Akers mekaniske Verksted.

== Family ==
He was the son of shipowner and banker Christopher Blom Paus and Erasmine Ernst, a native of Denmark. His first cousin was playwright Henrik Ibsen and his nephew was art collector and papal chamberlain, Count Christopher Tostrup Paus. His grandparents were shipowner Ole Paus and Johanne Plesner (formerly married Ibsen).

Ole Paus was married to Birgitte Halvordine Schou (1848–1923, a niece of Christian Julius Schou). They had several children

- Their daughter Martha Marie Paus (born 1876) was married to Otto von Munthe af Morgenstierne.
- Their son Christopher Blom Paus (1878-1959) was a businessman, owner of the company Ole Paus, and married Margit Keyser. He was the father of
  - Lawyer and businessman Per Christian Cornelius Paus (1910–86), who married Hedevig Wedel-Jarlsberg (born 1913), a daughter of Lord Chamberlain, Count Peder Anker Wedel-Jarlsberg. Per and Hedevig were the parents of Cornelia Paus, businessman Christopher Paus and businessman Peder Nicolas Paus. Christopher Paus married Cecilie Wilhelmsen, and was the father of fashion designer Pontine Paus and Olympia Paus, who is married to British Businessman Alexander Nix.
  - Else Birgitte Paus, who married Danish lawyer and papal chamberlain Gunnar Garth-Grüner (born 1903 at Lille Svenstrup), a son of land owner and Hofjægermester Gustav G. G. Garth-Grüner
- Their son Thorleif Paus (1881–1976) was the representative of Norsk Hydro in Austria-Hungary and the Norwegian Consul in Vienna, later a factory owner in Ålesund. He married Viennese Ella Stein, and was the father of General Ole Otto Paus and grandfather of singer Ole Paus
- Their daughter Else Margrethe Paus (born 1885) married businessman and distant relative Nicolay Nissen Paus (a co-owner of the Paus & Paus industrial company), and they were the parents of Lucie Paus and Fanny Paus, who married land owner Axel Løvenskiold and Ambassador Henrik Andreas Broch, respectively.
- Their daughter Fanny Paus (1888-1971) married businessman Trygve Andvord (1888-1958), a son of Richard Andvord
