= Else Werring =

Norwegian royal hostess (1905–1989)

Else Werring, née Wilhelmsen (29 April 1905 – 23 November 1989) was a Norwegian royal hostess.

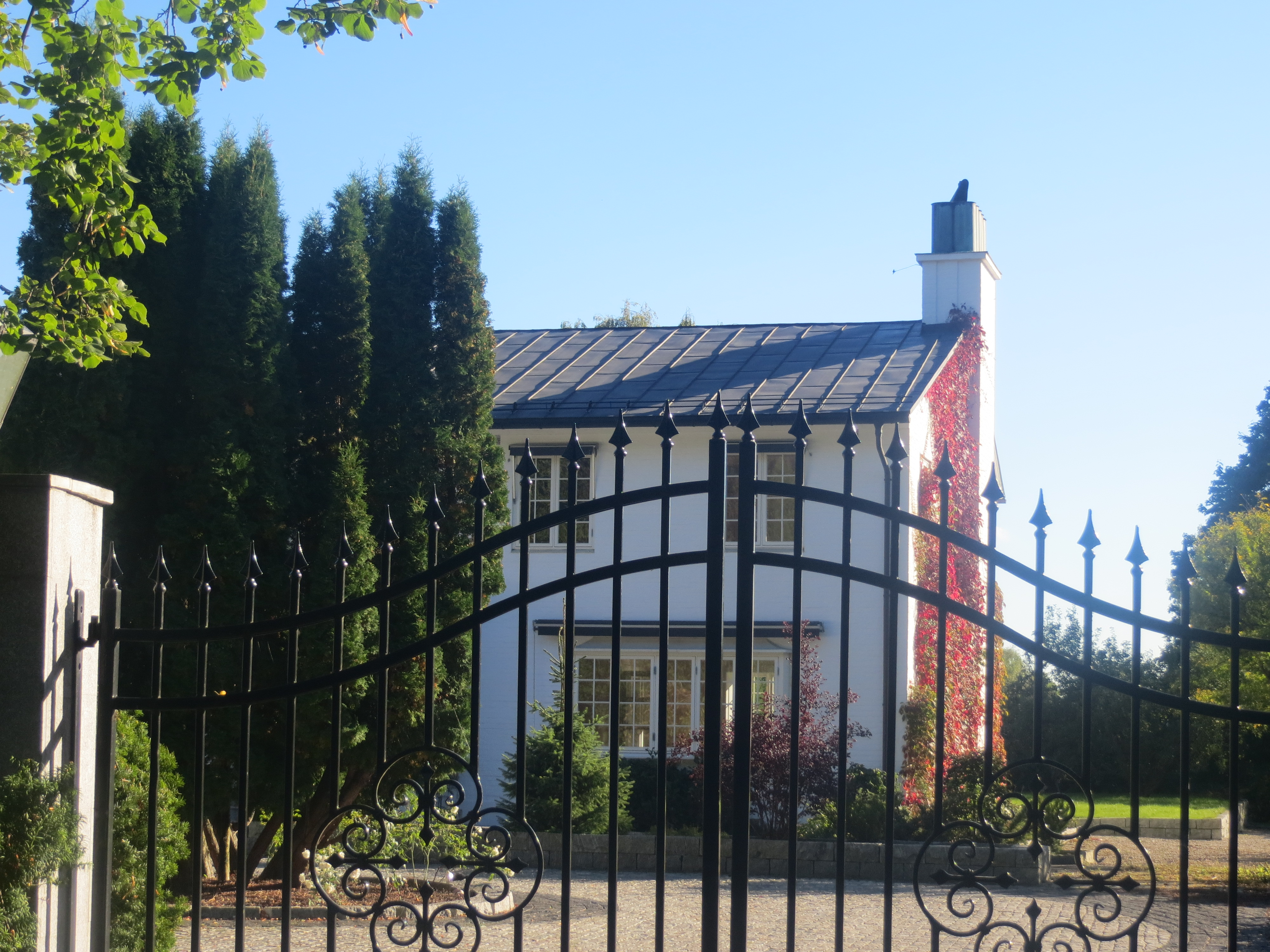
Munkebakken on Fornebu in Bærum

== Personal life ==
She was born in Tønsberg as a daughter of shipowner Halfdan Wilhelmsen (1864–1923) and Ragnhild Oppen (1869–1952). She was a granddaughter of the founder of Wilh. Wilhelmsen Wilhelm Wilhelmsen (1839–1910), an aunt of Tom Wilhelmsen and a niece of businessmen Finn, Axel and Wilhelm Wilhelmsen.

She had middle school, and also attended school for two years in England and one year in France. In March 1926 she married shipowner Niels Werring. The couple had four children; the daughters Ragnhild (who married Henning Astrup) and Gina "Else Catharine" and the sons Niels, Jr. and Morten. The Werring couple lived at the Munkebakken estate in Lysaker is a residence designed by Arnstein Arneberg. The family led a social life which included royals.

== Career ==
In January 1958 she was appointed by Olav V of Norway as Chief Court Mistress (Overhoffmesterinne) for the Norwegian royal family. When assuming the position, royal-friendly newspaper described her as "representative, highly cultivated, as beautiful as her predecessor in the office, mrs. Borghild Anker, and as eminent a hostess as her". Her main assignment was to assist the Crown Princess in her tasks as a hostess at the court. As such she played an important role in the social life at the Royal Palace. In 1958 the entire court of the Norwegian royal family comprised as little as seven people; Richard Andvord, Ingvald Smith-Kielland, Odd Grønvold and Ellinor Grønvold, Ingeborg von Hanno and Vincent Bommen. In 1985 she retired and was replaced by Ingegjerd Løvenskiold.

She was also a council member in the Nansen Academy from 1948 to 1962 and in the Filharmonisk Selskap from 1952 to 1960. She was a board member of several philanthropic institutions in Tønsberg. As a godmother in the baptising of ships belonging to her family's shipping company Wilh. Wilhelmsen, she donated "godmother gifts" to nonprofit organizations. She was an active churchgoer, and was fond of art collecting, literature, skiing, tennis and horseriding.

She was decorated as a Commander of the Order of St. Olav in 1967, and upgraded to Commander with Star in 1980. She also held the Grand Cross of the Order of the Dannebrog and the Order of the Polar Star. She died in November 1989.

Court offices
| Preceded by Borghild Anker | Overhoffmesterinne; 1958–1985 | Succeeded by Ingegjerd Løvenskiold Stuart |
