= Peter Collett Solberg =

Norwegian businessperson and politician

Peter Collett Solberg (28 October 1866 – 10 December 1934) was a Norwegian businessperson and politician for the Conservative Party. He served three terms in the Norwegian Parliament, and played an important role in the companies And. H. Kiær & Co and Norsk Elektrisk & Brown Boveri.

== Early life ==
Collett Solberg was born on the Kobbervik farm in the parish of Skouger in what is now Drammen, Norway. He was the son of businessman and politician Svend Adolph Solberg (1831–1890) and his wife Christiane Louise Arbo (1833–1913). He finished his secondary school at Drammen in 1884, and took the cand.jur. degree in 1888.

== Professional career ==
In 1890, Solberg was hired in the family company And. H. Kiær & Co in Fredrikstad. He built the company into a large corporation together with three members of the Kiær family; Elias C. Kiær and cousins Hans and Frits Kiær. Solberg was also among the builders of the company Norsk Elektrisk & Brown Boveri (NEBB), and served as chair of that company until his death.

== Politics ==
Solberg was elected to the Norwegian Parliament in 1898, representing the constituency of Fredrikstad, and was re-elected in 1900 and 1904. He was a member of Fredrikstad City Council from 1905 to 1907, and was also a member of Kristiania City Council, albeit for an unknown amount of time.

== Personal life ==
Solberg married his second cousin Anna Margrethe Kiær (1872–1963), daughter of industrialist Anders Ferrand Kiær (1825–1898) and his second wife, Martine Cappelen (1828–1875). Peter Collett Solberg and Anna Kiær had three daughters and two sons. In the 1900 census the family was registered as housing five domestic maids, a gardener and a coachman. Their son Sven Adolf Solberg (1896–1981) took over as CEO of Norsk Elektrisk & Brown Boveri in 1926, and married Catharine Wilhelmsen (1896–1951), a daughter of shipowner Halfdan Wilhelmsen (1864–1923) and granddaughter of shipping magnate Wilhelm Wilhelmsen.
