= Tom Wilhelmsen =

Tom Wilhelmsen may refer to:

- Tom Wilhelmsen (shipping magnate) (1911–1978), Norwegian shipping magnate
- Tom Wilhelmsen (baseball) (born 1983), American professional baseball pitcher

== See also ==
- Thomas Wilhelmsen (born 1974), Norwegian shipping magnate
