= Wilhelm Wilhelmsen =

Wilhelm Wilhelmsen may refer to:

- Wilhelm Wilhelmsen (ship owner, b. 1872) (1872–1955), Norwegian ship owner and yacht racer
- Wilhelm Wilhelmsen (1839–1910) (1839–1910), Norwegian shipping magnate, founder of the Wilh. Wilhelmsen shipping company, mayor and consul
