= Niels Werring =

Norwegian ship-owner

Niels Roth Heyerdahl Werring (4 August 1897 – 19 August 1990) was a Norwegian ship-owner. He was the senior director the shipping company Wilh. Wilhelmsen Holding ASA.

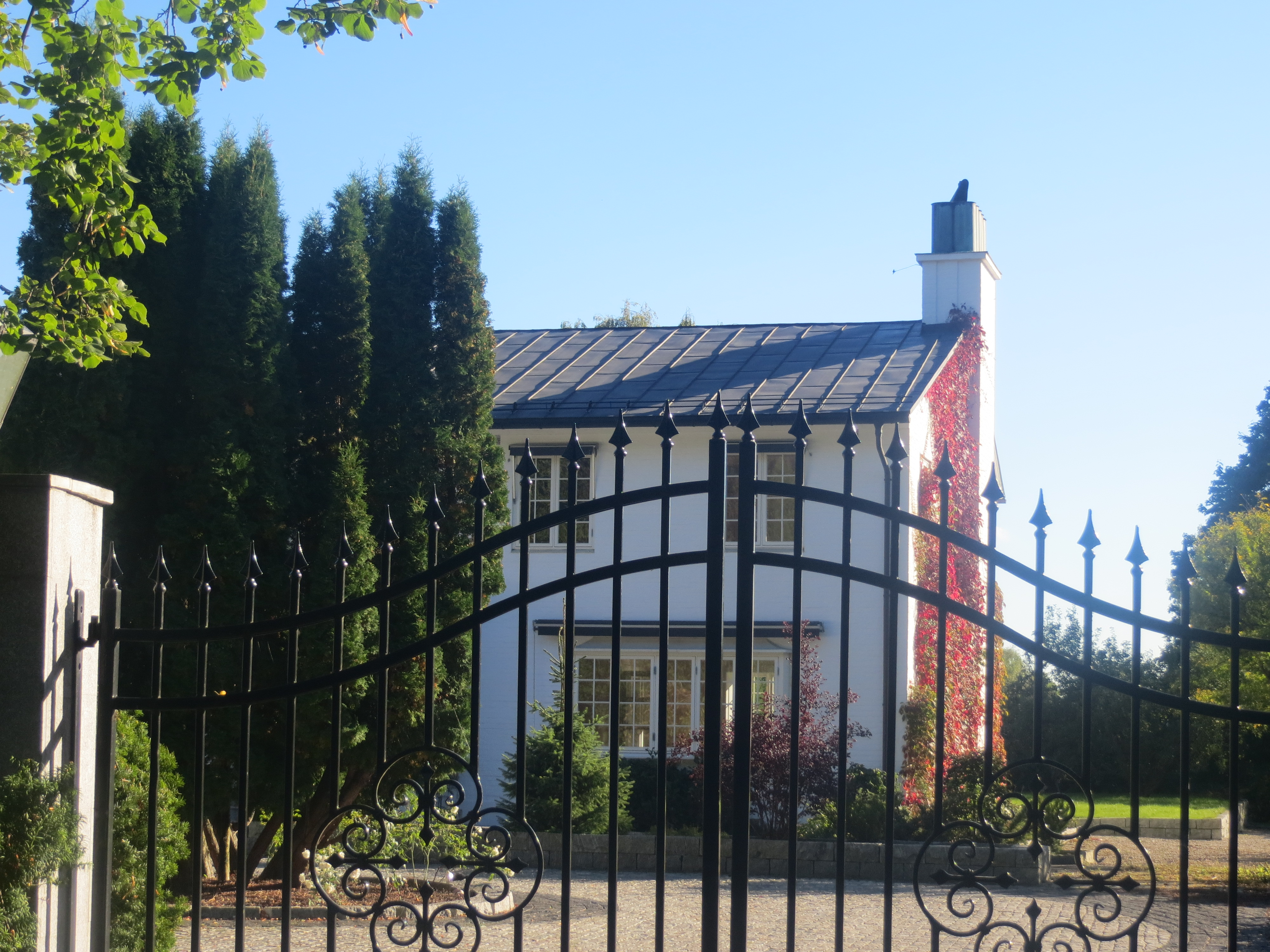
Munkebakken on Fornebu in Bærum

Werring was born at Kristiansund in Møre og Romsdal, Norway. He was the son of Edvard Werring (1857-1949) and Gina Mathea Heyerdahl (1872-1948). His family operated a company dealing in dried and salted cod. After graduating from the Oslo Commerce School (Oslo Handelsgymnasium) in 1916, he stayed for a few years in the United States and Brazil, as a representative of the family business.

In 1926, he was married to Else Heyerdahl Wilhelmsen (1905–1989), daughter of Halfdan Wilhelmsen (1864–1923) and granddaughter of Wilhelm Wilhelmsen, founder of one of the country's largest shipping company. They were the parents of three children. From 1930 to 1990, family members resided at the Munkebakken estate on Fornebu in Bærum.

Werring became a co-owner in the company Wilh. Wilhelmsen in 1930, a senior partner in 1955 and senior director from 1958 to 1973. He also sat in the board of a number of Norwegian shipping, industrial and trading companies, including the central government of the Norwegian Shipowners' Association (1945-47). Additionally he was a member of the Steering Committee of the Bilderberg Group (Bilderberg-gruppen).
