= Tom Wilhelmsen Opera and Ballet Prize =

Norwegian arts award

The Tom Wilhelmsen Opera and Ballet Prize (Norwegian: Tom Wilhelmsens Opera og Ballettpris) is the main opera and ballet prize of Norway, awarded by the philanthropic Tom Wilhelmsen's Foundation (Tom Wilhelmsens Stiftelse) in honour of shipping magnate Tom Wilhelmsen (1911-1978) through a donation from the billionaire Wilhelmsen family, owners of Norway's largest shipping company Wilh. Wilhelmsen. It includes an annual monetary prize of over 50,000 euro.

== Laureates ==
- 2009: Maiko Nishino and Eli Kristin Hansveen
- 2010: Silas Henriksen
- 2011: Marita Kvarving Sølvberg
- 2012: Yngve Søberg and Eugenie Skilnand
- 2013: Audun Iversen and Camilla Spidsøe Cohen
- 2014: Yolander Correa
- 2015: Ingeborg Gillebo
- 2016: Operaorkestret
- 2017: Melissa Hough and Adrian Angelico
- 2018: John Lidal and Alan Lucien Øyen
- 2019: Grete Sofie Borud Nybakken
