= Christopher Paus =

Christopher Paus may refer to

- Christopher de Paus, Norwegian papal chamberlain, count and philanthropist
- Christopher Paus (businessman), Norwegian businessman in the shipping and offshore industries
- Christopher Blom Paus, Norwegian ship-owner and uncle of Henrik Ibsen
- Christopher Lintrup Paus, British diplomat
