= Elias C. Kiær =

Norwegian businessman

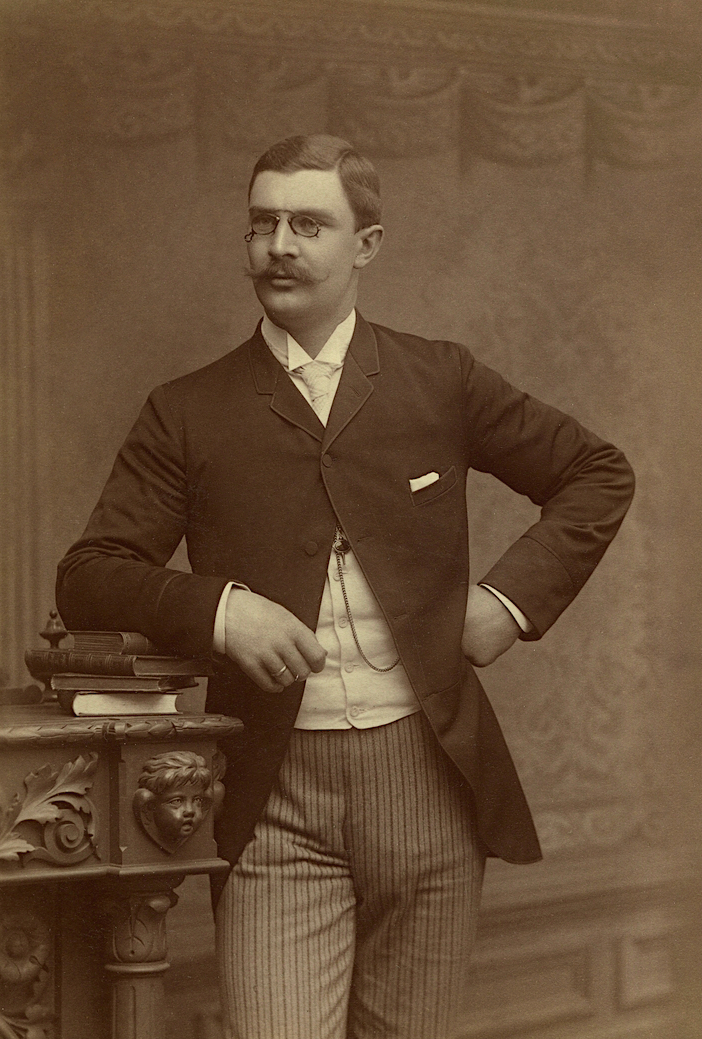
Image of Elias Cathrinus Kiær

Elias Cathrinus Kiær (27 February 1863 – 13 April 1939) was a Norwegian businessperson.

He was born at Drammen in Buskerud, Norway. He was as the son of wholesaler Hans Theodor Kiær (1827–1911) as well as being a grandson of Hans Andersen Kiær and nephew of Anders F. Kiær. Elias C. Kiær was also an uncle of paleontologist Johan Aschehoug Kiær and organizational worker Dakky Kiær.

In 1895 he took over the family company And. H. Kiær & Co from his uncle Anders—co-owners were his uncle Hans Theodor, first cousin Frits and Anders' son-in-law Peter Collett Solberg. The company was greatly expanded in the years before 1920, buying forest areas and founding paper mills and sawmills. However, following the economic hardships of the Interwar Period, the company declined.

His son, Hans Th Kiær, had taken over as CEO in 1916 and his nephew Thorry Kiær also played an important role in the 1920s,
