= Villa Paus =

Villa at Bygdøy, Oslo

Coordinates: 59.9056°N 10.6948°E

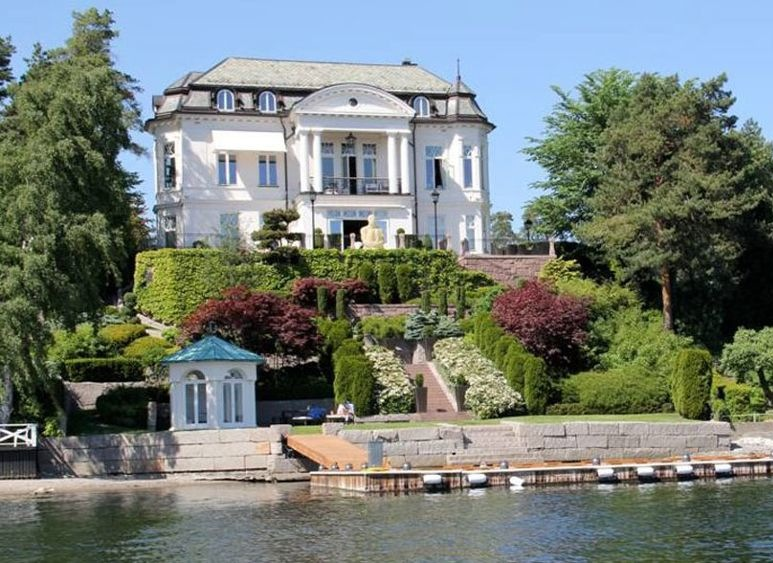
Villa Paus

Villa Paus (Pausvillaen) is a listed villa in Oslo, Norway. It is located at Christian Benneches vei 6 in Bygdøy.

== History ==
The villa was built in 1907 for the iron and steel industrialist Ole Paus (1846-1931), a member of the Paus family, founder of the steel company Ole Paus and chairman of the commercial bank Den norske Creditbank (now DNB ASA). It combines Neo-Baroque and Art Nouveau influences. The property comprises about 1200 square meters, including ten main rooms, rooms for servants and a big hall, and originally had around 7 decare park and 80 metres shoreline. In the 1970s five new villas were built on parts of the park which were partitioned off.

During the German occupation of Norway during World War II, the villa was used as the summer residence of Josef Terboven (1898-1945), German Civilian Administrator of Norway.

From 1953 it was owned by the barrister Mathias Dahl-Hansen and his family. In 1997, the villa was sold to the billionaire Petter Stordalen, one of Norway's richest men. In 1999 Finansavisen described the villa as Norway's most expensive residence and in 2016 the business magazine Kapital estimated the villa to be worth 150 million kroner (ca. 16 million euro).

In front of the villa there is a three-meter luminous statue of Buddha. The sculpture is called "Sitting Tattoo with Mountains."
