= Borghild Anker =

Norwegian court official

Borghild Anker (1876–1955), was a Norwegian court official.

She served as the overhoffmesterinne of the Royal Court of Norway. The queen of Norway died in 1938, and there were to be no new queen until 1990. As senior lady-in-waiting, Anker came to play a ceremonial role as official hostess of the royal court.

She was married to Peter Martin Anker.

Court offices
Preceded by Emma Stang	Overhoffmesterinne; 1927–1955	Succeeded by Else Werring
