= Annelise Knudtzon =

Norwegian textile artist (1914–2006)

Annelise Caroline Knudtzon née Kiær (1914–2006) was a Norwegian textile artist. From 1946, she managed her own studio in Oslo where she and her employees produced brightly coloured hand-woven woolen fabrics, especially upholstery. In collaboration with the painter Knut Rumohr, she revived the old technique of using rye straw for weaving. Together they produced carpets with abstract designs based on nature. Knudtzon designed patterns for the Norwegian textile firm Røros Tweed from 1958 to 1975. In 1984, she received the Jacob Prize, a Norwegian cultural award.

== Early life ==
Born in Oslo on 25 October 1914, Anne-Lise Caroline Kiær was the daughter of the industrialist Thorvald (Thorry) Meyer Kiær (1888–1968) and his wife Ingrid née Thaulow (1892–1983). She married Fritz Knudtzon (1910–1999). In the mid-1930s, she had gained experience working with the textile artist Maija Kansanen-Størseth in Helsinki. She attended the Norwegian National Academy of Craft and Art Industry from 1943 to 1944.

== Career ==
in 1946, Knudtzon established her own studio in Oslo. Initially, despite post-war rationing, she tried as far a possible to use wool, producing brightly coloured fabrics. The firm went on to produce curtains, upholstery and carpets. In the 1950s and 1960s, she received a number of significant commissions for interior decoration, for example for the Stiftsgården residence and the Archbishop's Palace in Trondheim. She has also produced fabrics for several hotels in Norway and for Norwegian embassies around the world.

From 1953, she began collaborating with the painter Knut Rumohr, initially producing carpets with geometrical designs. The later revived the old technique using rye straw for weaving carpets, often with abstract designs from nature. Apart from Sigrun Berg, Knudtzon is the only designer in Norway to have used rye straw for high-quality products. Knudtzon designed patterns for the Norwegian textile firm Røros Tweed from 1958 to 1975.

Knudtzon's works can be seen in the Nordenfjeldske Kunstindustrimuseum, Trondheim, and in the Norwegian Museum of Science and Technology, Oslo.

Annelise Knudtzon died in Oslo on 4 September 2006.

== Awards ==
Knudtzon received the Norwegian cultural award, the Jacob Prize, in 1984.
