= Pontine Paus =

London-based Norwegian designer and shipping heiress

Cecilie Alexandra Pontine Paus
- Born: 15 June 1973 (age 53); Athens, Greece
- Occupations: Designer and businesswoman

Cecilie Alexandra Pontine Paus (born 15 June 1973) is a London-based Norwegian designer and shipping heiress. A member of the billionaire Wilhelmsen family on her mother's side, she is one of the owners of Wilh. Wilhelmsen, one of the world's largest shipping companies. She is known for designing handbags sold under her label House of Paus, and was described by Vogue in the early 2000s as the "hottest new name in handbags". She is the founder of the beauty brand Dr.Lipp.

== Background ==
Pontine Paus was born to Norwegian parents in Athens, Greece, in 1973, and moved to London in 1979. A member of the Paus family on her father's side and the billionaire Wilhelmsen family on her mother's side, she is the eldest daughter of the London-based shipping and petroleum investor Christopher Paus and Cecilie Paus (née Wilhelmsen). Her father is the son of the steel industrialist Per Paus and Countess Hedevig Wedel-Jarlsberg, whose father was Lord Chamberlain Peder Anker Wedel-Jarlsberg. Her mother belongs to the Wilhelmsen shipping family and has owned Wilh. Wilhelmsen with her siblings since 1978. Pontine Paus' maternal grandfather was shipping magnate Tom Wilhelmsen. She is a Norwegian citizen, but has lived all her life in Greece and England. Her sister Olympia is married to Alexander Nix.

== Career ==
She attended Marlborough College, an independent boarding school in Wiltshire, and later studied industrial design in Milan before turning to fashion.

As a designer, Paus is known for handbags, as the owner of the House of Paus fashion label. She was called by Vogue as the "hottest new name in handbags" in 2003. Customers have included Kylie Minogue, Queen Silvia of Sweden and Queen Sonja of Norway. In Norway, her handbags are sold by Benedikte Ferner who cites Pontine Paus as her favourite handbag designer, and UK outlets include Paul & Joe, Ananya and Mirage. Her other business endeavours include beauty brand Dr.Lipp which she founded after experiencing eczema earlier in life.

She is one of the main owners of Wilh. Wilhelmsen; her family combined owns over 60% of the company's shares and additionally several billion in other companies. In 2020 her family branch launched a battle for control over the family's main holding company, due to the fact that her cousin Thomas Wilhelmsen holds the only vote in the company although the female family members own the majority of the shares. Together with other family members she was also a major shareholder of Scorpion Offshore until it was bought by John Fredriksen's Seadrill in 2010.

== Personal life ==
She was in a relationship with Harry Primrose, 8th Earl of Rosebery, the chairman of Sotheby's.
