= Hans Kiær =

Norwegian politician

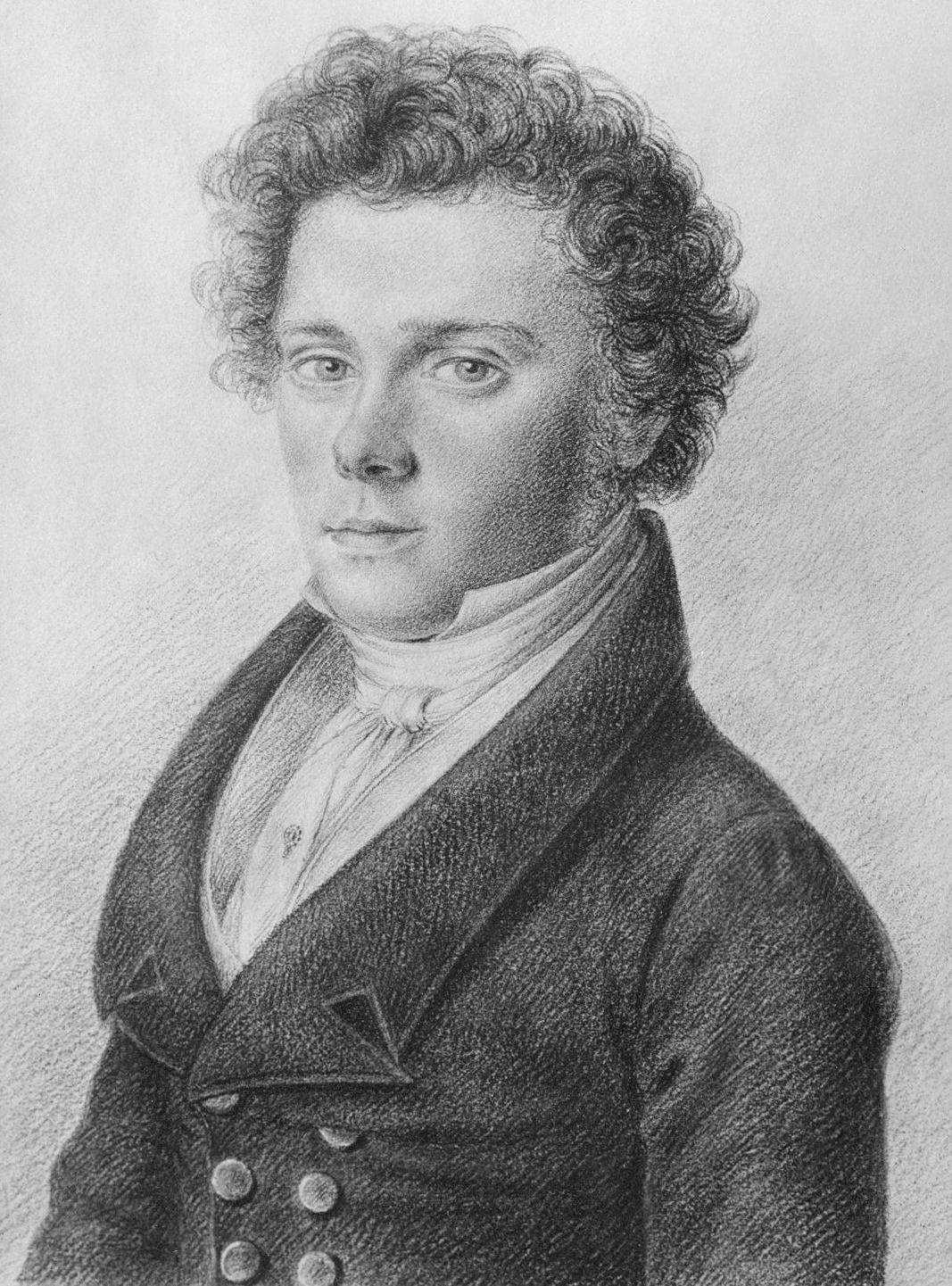

Hans Andersen Kiær (1795–1867) was a Norwegian businessperson and politician.

He was a part of a large ship-owner family, starting with his father Anders Hansen Kiær (1769–1838). He was the brother of Niels Andersen Kiær, and through him the uncle of physician and historian Frantz Casper Kiær and director of Statistics Norway, Anders Nicolai Kiær.

Himself, Hans Andersen Kiær fathered the businessmen Anders, Hans Theodor and Oluf Emil Kiær, as well as the priest Hagbarth Kiær. Anders F. Kiær founded the company And. H. Kiær & Co. Through Hans Theodor, Hans Andersen Kiær was the grandfather of Elias C. Kiær and great-grandfather of Hans Theodor Kiær, both of whom carried the directorship of And. H. Kiær & Co. Through Hagbarth, Hans Andersen Kiær was the grandfather of paleontologist Johan Aschehoug Kiær. Through Oluf Emil, Hans Andersen Kiær was the grandfather of Frits Kiær and great-grandfather of Thorry and Dakky Kiær.

Hans Kiær was elected to the Norwegian Parliament in 1830, representing the constituency of Drammen. He worked as a timber merchant in that city. He sat through one term.
