= Svend Adolph Solberg =

Norwegian businessman and politician

Svend Adolph Solberg (17 April 1831 – 3 May 1890) was a Norwegian businessman and politician.

Solberg was born at Drammen in Buskerud, Norway. He was the son of Andreas Solberg (1801–1862) and his wife Ingeborg Nicoline Kiær (1801–1862). Following the death of his parents, he took over the Kobbervik farm at Åskollen which his father had acquired in 1842. After graduation (cand.jur), Solberg went to work as a wholesaler for the firm Hans Kiær & Co. in Drammen The company, which was involved in the timber industry, was owned and operated by relatives of his mother's family. In 1880, he was elected to the Norwegian Parliament, representing the constituency of Drammen. He only served one term.

Solberg was married to Christiane Louise Arbo (1833–1913). Their children included Peter Collett Solberg (1866–1934) who became a politician and businessman.
