= Cecilie Paus =

Norwegian businesswoman (born 1943)

Cecilie Paus (born 1943), née Wilhelmsen, is a Norwegian businesswoman in the shipping industry, who lives in London. She has been one of the four main owners of the shipping company Wilh. Wilhelmsen since 1978 together with her three siblings. She is a daughter of the shipping magnate Tom Wilhelmsen and is married to the businessman Christopher Paus. She is the mother of four children, among them daughters Olympia and Pontine Paus, a designer.
