= Wilhelm Wilhelmsen (ship owner, b. 1872) =

Norwegian ship owner and yacht racer

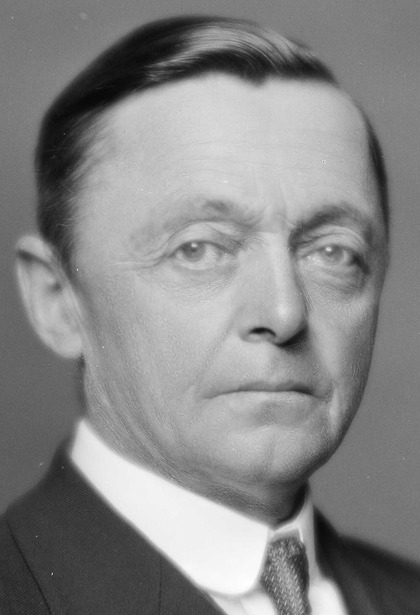
Wilhelm in the 1930s. Photo by Ernest Rude.

Wilhelm Wilhelmsen (11 March 1872 – 11 May 1955) was a Norwegian ship owner and yacht racer. He was born in Tønsberg, and was the son of ship owner Wilhelm Wilhelmsen. He managed the company Wilh. Wilhelmsen, Norway's largest shipping company, from 1923 until his death in 1955. His son Tom Wilhelmsen (1911–1978) took over.

He represented the Royal Norwegian Yacht Club, and competed at the 1928 Summer Olympics in Amsterdam, where his boat placed fourth in the 8-meter class.

He was decorated Commander with Star of the Order of St. Olav in 1945. He died in Oslo in 1955.
