= Anders Nicolai Kiær =

Norwegian civil servant (1838–1919)

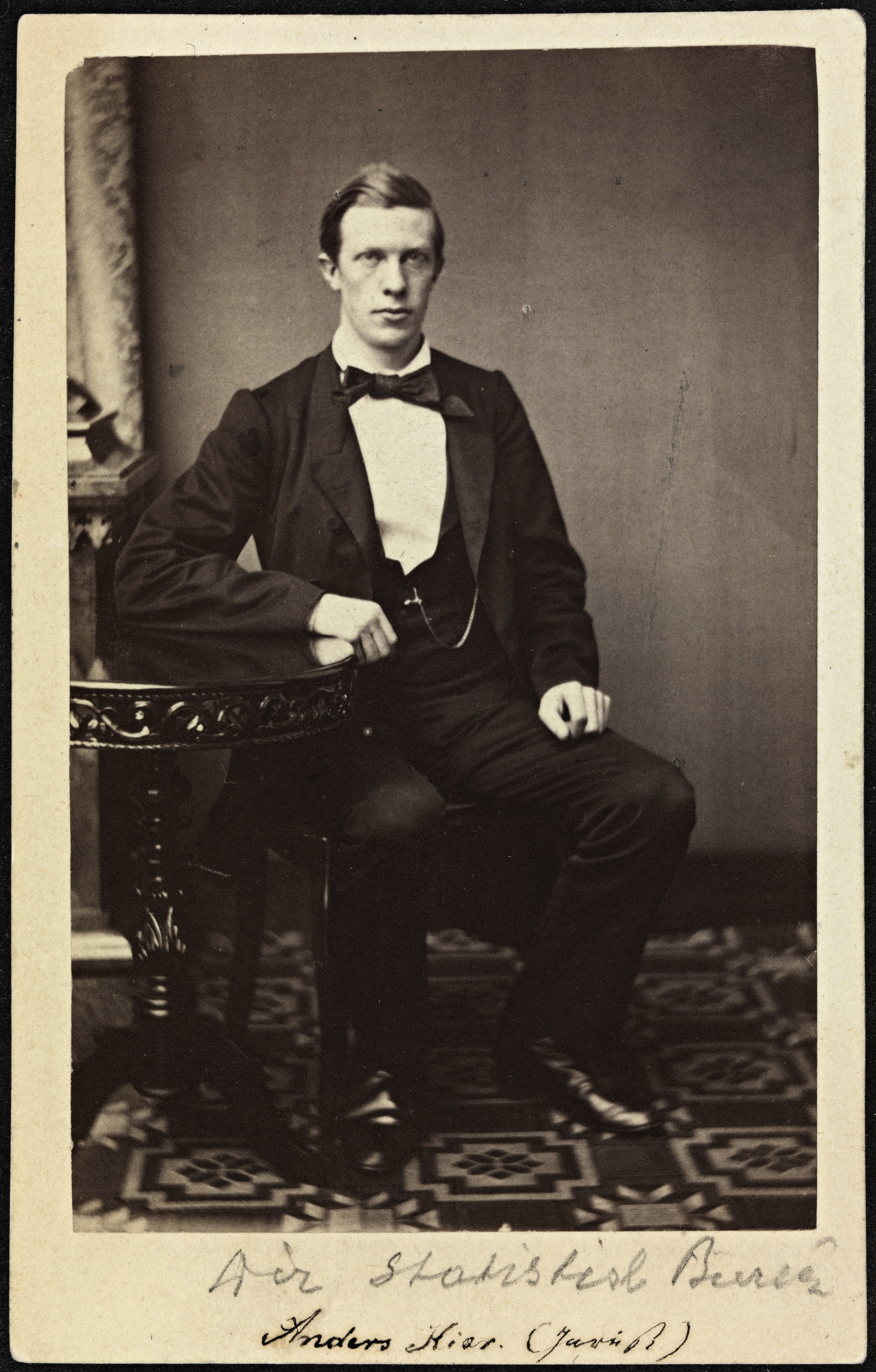

Anders Nicolai Kiær (Drammen, 15 September 1838 – Oslo, 16 April 1919) was a Norwegian statistician who first proposed that a representative sample rather than a complete enumerating survey could and should be used to collect information about a population.

He was born in Drammen as the son of ship-owner Niels Andersen Kiær (1802–1887), and brother of physician and historian Frantz Casper Kiær. He graduated as cand.jur. in 1860, and was hired as head of the statistics department in the Ministry of the Interior in 1868. In 1877 he was appointed director of the newly appointed office Statistics Norway, staying in this position until 1913. Before 1882 he functioned as a co-director together with Jakob Mohn.

Anders Nicolai Kiær was a nephew of Hans Andersen Kiær and first cousin of businessmen Hans Theodor and Anders F. Kiær. The latter founded the company And. H. Kiær & Co.

== Publications ==
- The Representative Method of Statistical Surveys. New edition with English Translation at the Centenary of the Central Bureau of Statistics) Includes bibliography (1869–1919)
