= Halfdan Wilhelmsen =

Norwegian shipowner and consul

- Born: March 11, 1864; Tønsberg, Norway
- Died: November 18, 1923 (aged 59); Kristiania, Norway
- Occupation(s): Shipowner, consul
- Children: Else Werring
- Father: Wilhelm Wilhelmsen
- Relatives: Wilhelm Wilhelmsen

Halfdan Wilhelmsen (March 11, 1864 – November 18, 1923) was a Norwegian shipowner and consul.

Wilhelmsen was born in Tønsberg, the son of the shipowner Wilhelm Wilhelmsen and his wife Catharina Fredrikke Lorentzen.

After graduating from business school, he was employed in brokerage and shipowners' offices in England, Germany, and France. In 1887, he became the co-owner of his father's company, Wilh. Wilhelmsen. He built this up into the largest shipping company in the Nordic region, and he was one of the pioneers in the transition from sailing ships to steamships.

Wilhelmsen served as the British and Danish Consul in Tønsberg. In 1909, he was one of the founders of the Norwegian Shipowners' Association. Among other assignments, Wilhelmsen was Norway's delegate at the Paris Peace Conference in 1919 and in US government loan negotiations. In 1915, he was appointed knight first class of the Order of St. Olav. He was also a knight of the Danish Order of the Dannebrog and the French Legion of Honour. Halfdan Wilhelmsen Avenue (Halfdan Wilhelmsens allé) in Tønsberg is named after him.

In 1891, he married Ragnhild Oppen (1869–1952) from Larvik, and their daughter Else Werring was born in 1905. Wilhelmsen died after a short illness in 1923.
