= Johan Aschehoug Kiær =

Norwegian paleontologist and geologist

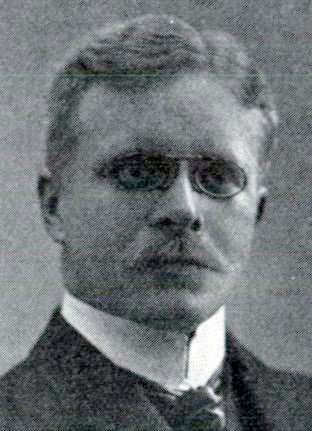
Johan Aschehoug Kiær

Johan Aschehoug Kiær (October 11, 1869 – October 31, 1931) was a Norwegian paleontologist and geologist.

== Biography ==
Johan Kiær was born in Drammen, Norway. He was the son of parish priest Hagbarth Kiær (1829–1903) and grandson of shipowner and Member of Parliament Hans Andersen Kiær (1795–1867). He was a nephew of Elias C. Kiær (1863–1939) operator of the family company And. H. Kiær & Co. which had been founded by his great-grandfather, Anders Hansen Kiær (1769–1838).

Kiær studied zoology and then paleontology for three years under Professor Karl Alfred von Zittel (1839–1904) at the Ludwig-Maximilians-Universität München (LMU) where he received his doctorate in 1896. In 1909, he was appointed professor of paleontology at the University of Oslo, as the first in Norway to hold such a position. He was also head of the Palaeontological Museum of Oslo which opened in 1920.

His most important publication was his doctoral dissertation from 1906, Das Obersilur im Kristianiagebiete. His most notable work was the excavation of a rich fauna of jawless fish and sea scorpions from the Rudstangen fauna of the Sundvollen Formation in the stratigraphy of the Ringerike Group (1908, 1911, 1924). He also took part in work on Spitsbergen and to Novaya Zemlya. His work covered corals, trilobites, and especially Devonian and Silurian fishes.

Kiær was responsible for the construction of the paleontological section of the Paleontologisk Museum at Tøyen in Oslo. He was an important inspiration for the work of palaeontologist Anatol Heintz (1898–1975) who was director of the Paleontological Museum from 1940.

== Selected works ==
- Das Obersilur im Kristianiagebiete (1906)
- Revision der mittelsilurischen Heliolitiden und neue Beitrage zur Stammes geschichte derselben (1903)
