= Peder Anker Wedel-Jarlsberg =

Norwegian courtier, military officer and estate owner

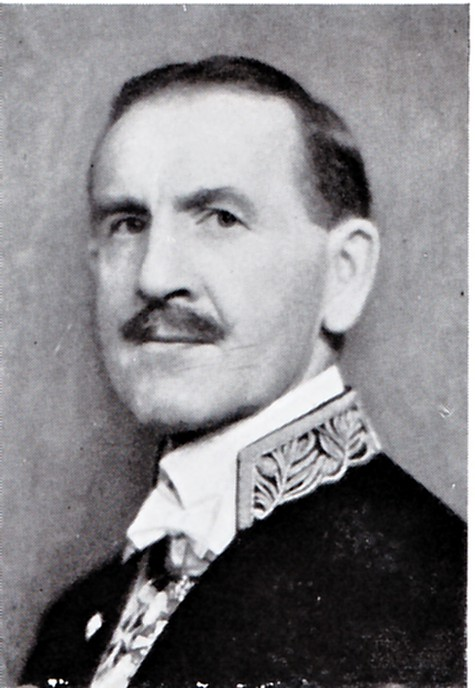
Peder Anker Wedel-Jarlsberg

Peder Anker, Count of Wedel-Jarlsberg (born 18 August 1875, died 13 October 1954) was a Norwegian courtier, military officer and estate owner. He served as Lord Chamberlain for King Haakon VII of Norway from 1931 to 1945 and was one of the King's closest confidants for over thirty years. In 1946 he succeeded his brother as head of the house of Wedel-Jarlsberg and feudal count (lensgreve), the highest rank of the Dano-Norwegian nobility and equivalent to Duke in other countries.

== Career ==
He graduated as an officer in 1897 and became the King's adjutant in 1913. He was appointed Chamberlain in 1925 and Second Court Marshal in 1927. He became First Court Mashal and Lord Chamberlain in 1931. During the Second World War, he left the country with the royal family and accompanied Crown Princess Märtha to the United States. In 1945, he was awarded the Grand Cross of the Order of St. Olav, the highest honour of Norway.

From birth he held the title of Baron of Wedel-Jarlsberg. He succeeded his brother Karl Peder Boguslav Herman Wedel Jarlsberg as Feudal Count (lensgreve), head of the House of Wedel-Jarlsberg and holder of the entailed estate (historically fief) of Jarlsberg in 1946; feudal count was the highest rank of the Danish and Norwegian nobility, equivalent to Duke in other countries, and Wedel-Jarlsberg was the only Norwegian to hold this rank.

== Family and issue ==
Peder Anker Wedel-Jarlsberg was the son of Johan Caspar Herman Wedel Jarlsberg (1841–1922) and was married to Hermine Westye Egeberg, the daughter of industrialist Einar Westye Egeberg. They were the parents of

- Feudal Count Johan Caspar Herman Wedel Jarlsberg (1902–70), Owner (Stamhusbesitter) of Jarlsberg
- Countess Cecilie Helene Wedel-Jarlsberg (born 1904-2001), married businessman and factory owner Bernt Julius Fossum (1898–1971)(CEO and owner of Stormbull AS) They were parents of Celine Womach, Bernt J. Fossum, Per Wedel Fossum and Lucie Fossum Ihlen.
- Countess Harriet Celine Wedel-Jarlsberg (born 1908-2001), married Ambassador, cand.jur. Peter Martin Anker (1903–77)
- Countess Hedevig Wedel-Jarlsberg (1913–96), married cand.jur. Per Christian Cornelius Paus (CEO of Ole Paus). They were the parents of Peder Nicolas Paus, Christopher Paus and Cornelia Paus, and the grandparents of Pontine Paus and Olympia Paus.
- Baron Carl-Fredrik Wedel-Jarlsberg (1916–94)
