= Ole Paus (general) =

Norwegian General, diplomat and NATO official

Major General Ole Paus
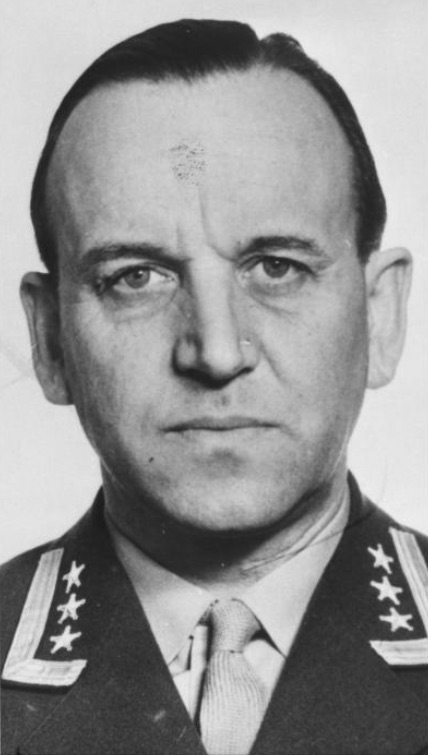
- General Ole Paus
- Born: Ole von Paus; 26 October 1910; Meislingeramt, Austria-Hungary
- Died: 6 April 2003 (aged 92); Oslo, Norway
- Military career
- Allegiance: Norway
- Branch: Norwegian Army
- Service years: 1932–1974
- Rank: Major General
- Commands: District commander of Trøndelag; Land deputy commander, Allied Forces Northern Europe
- Conflicts: World War II; Cold War
- Awards: Commander of the Royal Norwegian Order of St. Olav; Commander of the Order of the Sword

Ole Otto Cicin von Paus (26 October 1910 – 6 April 2003), known as Ole Paus, was a Norwegian general, diplomat and NATO official. During the Second World War he was an aide-de-camp to the Norwegian commander-in-chief, General Otto Ruge, during the German invasion of Norway in 1940, and was later head of the army group in the military intelligence service of the exile Norwegian High Command in London and thus one of the founders of the Norwegian Intelligence Service. During the Cold War he served as a military attaché in Stockholm and Helsinki during the 1950s, was promoted to general in 1964 and was commander-in-chief in Central Norway from 1964 to 1971. From 1971 to 1974 he was the Norwegian representative in the NATO military command for Northern Europe, Allied Forces Northern Europe. As such he was the highest-ranking Norwegian in NATO's command structure.

== Background ==
He was born in Meislingeramt and grew up in Vienna, Austria-Hungary as the son of the Norwegian Consul-General in Vienna, Thorleif (von) Paus, and a Viennese mother of Jewish descent, Gabrielle ("Ella") Stein. On his father's side he belonged to the Norwegian Paus family and he was named for his grandfather, the steel industrialist and banker Ole Paus (who was a first cousin of Henrik Ibsen). He was a maternal grandson of the Viennese lawyer August Stein (1852–1890). August Stein left the Jewish Community of Vienna in 1877 and he and his children were baptized as Catholics in 1885/86. Ella left the Catholic Church when she married Ole's father. During his childhood the family name was officially spelled von Paus in Austria-Hungary, although the family sometimes used the spelling de Paus. The particle von in the country was a privilege of the Austro-Hungarian nobility and foreigners deemed to be of equivalent status; his father had moved to Vienna as a consular official and been registered under that name by the foreign ministry. The particle was banned by law in Austria in 1919, and after he had moved to Norway he was known as Ole Paus, as the family did not use a particle in Norway. He was the father of the singer Ole Paus.

== Career ==
He graduated from the Theresianum in 1929. He subsequently moved to Norway at the age of 19. After learning Norwegian, he attended the Norwegian Military Academy and graduated as an officer in 1932. He graduated from the Norwegian Military College in 1938, from the Senior Officers' School in the United Kingdom in 1947, and attended the NATO Defence College in Paris in 1963.

During the Second World War, he joined the exile Norwegian High Command in London, where he served in the military intelligence service as head of the army group, in succession to Paal Frisvold.

In 1949 he served in the Independent Norwegian Brigade Group in Germany. He served as the Norwegian military attaché in Stockholm from 1953 and Helsinki from 1954. In 1964 he was promoted to major-general; at the time only the King was a full general, the rank of lieutenant-general was rarely used and major-general was in practice the highest rank for most active-duty officers. He was commander-in-chief in Central Norway from 1964 to 1971. From 1971 to 1974 he was Land Deputy of the Allied Forces Northern Europe, i.e. the Norwegian representative in the NATO military command for Northern Europe (Denmark, Norway, Northern Germany and the Baltic Sea).

In 1973 he became a Commander of the Royal Norwegian Order of St. Olav, the Norwegian equivalent of a British knighthood.

Among friends and family he was known as "The General" (Norwegian: Generalen).

== Military ranks ==
- 1932: Lieutenant
- 1943: Captain
- 1945: Major
- 1951: Lieutenant colonel
- 1956: Colonel
- 1964: Major general

== Honours ==
- Commander of the Royal Norwegian Order of St. Olav, 1973, for services towards the restoration of the Archbishop's Palace, Trondheim
- Commander of the Order of the Sword, for services as military attaché in Sweden
- Several others
