= Counts of Wedel-Jarlsberg =

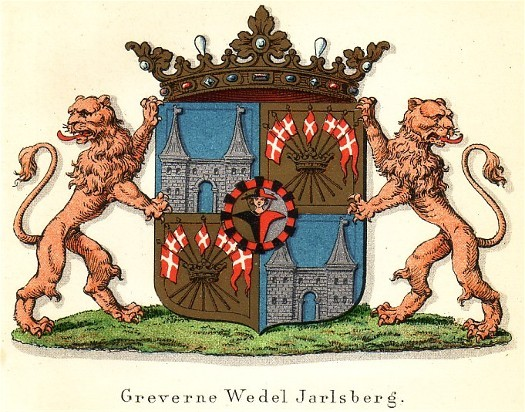
Coat of Arms of the Feudal Counts of Wedel-Jarlsberg.

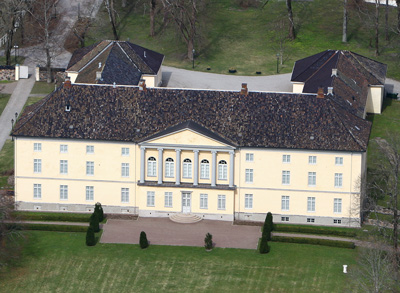
Jarlsberg Manor

The Count of Wedel-Jarlsberg (also Wedel Jarlsberg) is a title of the Norwegian nobility and of the Danish nobility. The family of Wedel-Jarlsberg is a branch of the larger family von Wedel, which comes from Pomerania, Germany. Family members have had a significant position in the 18th and 19th centuries' Norwegian history.

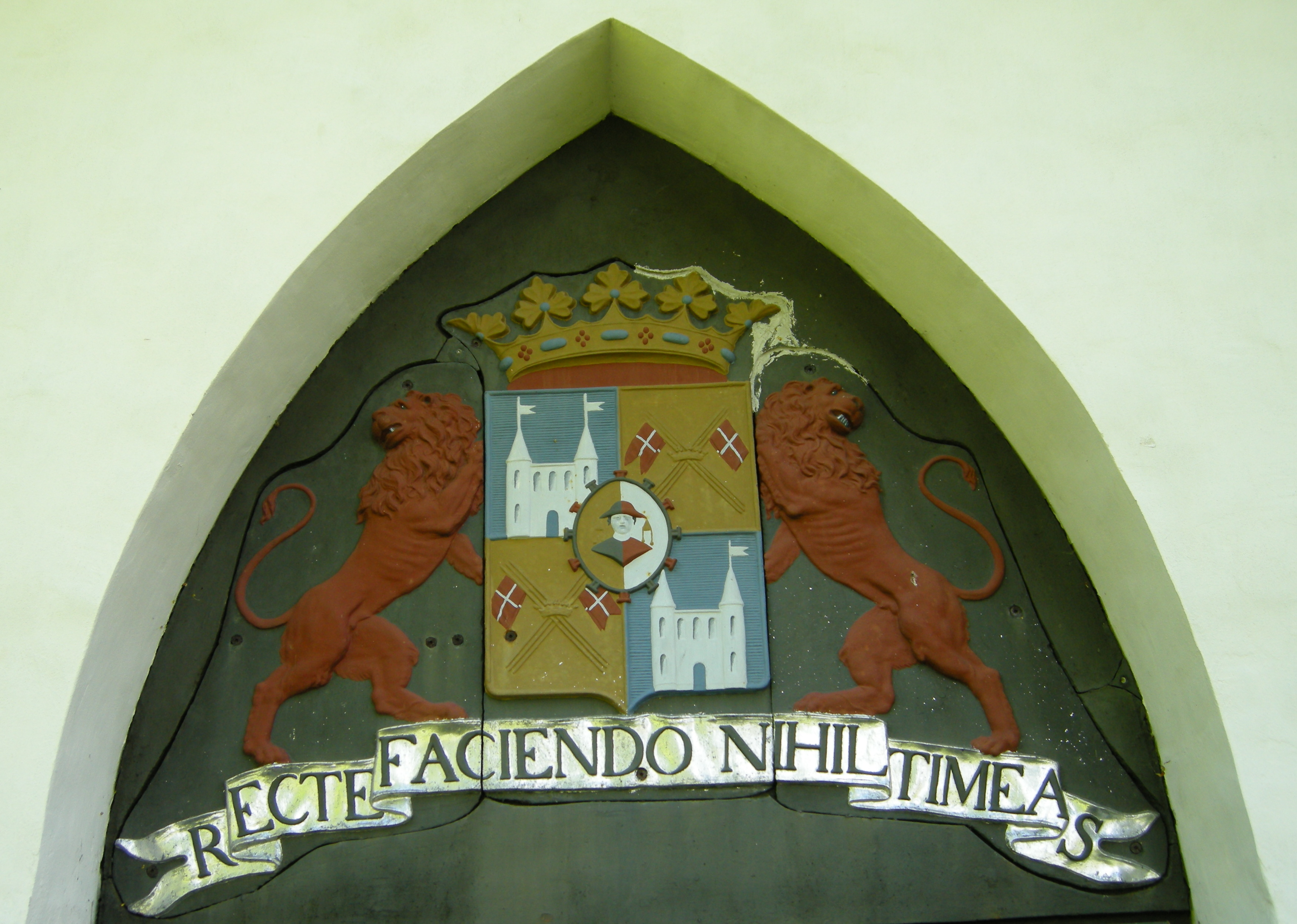
Coat of Arms over the door to the Sem Church family chapel at Jarlsberg Hovedgård

Feudal Count Johan Caspar Herman Wedel-Jarlsberg played in 1814 an active role in the constitutional assembly at Eidsvoll, and was the first native Norwegian to hold the post of Governor-general of Norway (representing the absent king as head of the Norwegian cabinet) during the union with Sweden.

== History ==
The family's oldest known ancestors lived in Pomerania, but it is assumed that the family originated in Holstein and that is named for Wedel, a small town (now a suburb) just outside Hamburg. Gustav Wilhelm von Wedel (1641–1717) entered the service of Denmark–Norway and became commanding general in Norway in 1681. He bought the estate of Jarlsberg and received the title of count in 1684. Among his descendants were count Herman Wedel-Jarlsberg, a noted politician in the first part of the 19th century.

Peder Anker Wedel-Jarlsberg (1875–1954) served as Lord Chamberlain for King Haakon VII from 1931 to 1945 and was one of the King's closest confidants for over thirty years. He was married to Hermine Egeberg, a daughter of the major industrialist Einar Westye Egeberg. Among their descendants are the last three counts and owners of Jarlsberg, his son Johan Caspar Herman Wedel Jarlsberg (1902–1970), his grandson Gustav Wilhelm Wedel-Jarlsberg (1931–1999) and his great-grandson Carl Nicolaus Wedel Jarlsberg (born 1973). Peder Anker Wedel-Jarlsberg was also the grandfather of the businessmen Christopher Paus and Peder Paus, and the great-grandfather of the designer Pontine Paus.

=== Barons of Wedel-Jarlsberg ===
Several members of the Wedel-Jarlsberg family, and mainly younger sons and daughters of the count, had baronial dignity.

=== 1821 ===
The 1821 Law of Nobility abolished noble privileges and the recognition of noble titles in Norway, but, however, allowed the current bearers to keep the recognised noble status and titles for their lifetime. Thus, the title Feudal Count of Wedel-Jarlsberg did not end until the death of Feudal Count Peder Anker Wedel-Jarlsberg (1809–1893).

=== Jarlsberg Hovedgård ===
Jarlsberg Manor three kilometres northwest of the centre of the town of Tønsberg in Vestfold, Norway has traditionally been the residence of members of the Wedel-Jarlsberg family.

== Gallery ==
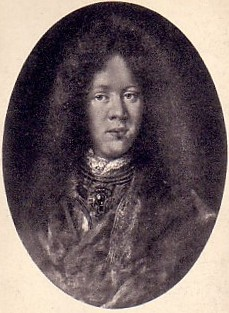
Gustav Wilhelm Wedel Jarlsberg (1641-1717)

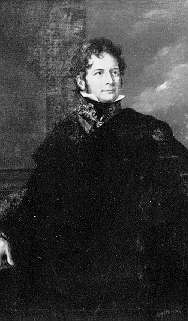
Count Johan Caspar Herman Wedel-Jarlsberg (1779-1840)

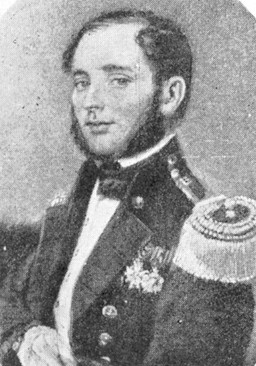
Ferdinand Carl Maria Wedel Jarlsberg(1781-1857)

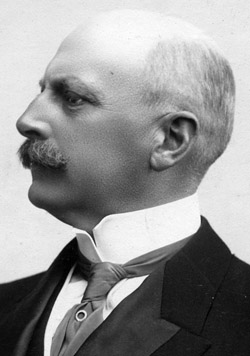
Baron Fredrik Hartvig Herman Wedel Jarlsberg (1855-1942)

== See also ==
- Danish nobility
- Norwegian nobility
