= Thomas Wilhelmsen =

Norwegian shipping magnate (born 1974)

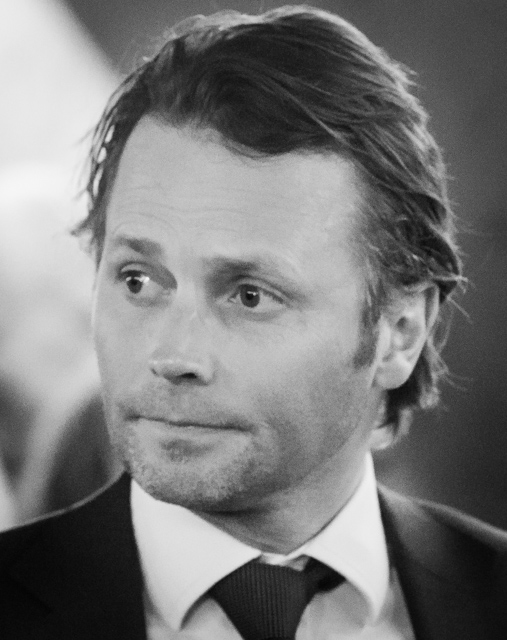
Thomas Wilhelmsen

Thomas Wilhelmsen (born 3 July 1974) is a Norwegian shipping magnate. He is one of the owners and the current chief executive officer of Wilh. Wilhelmsen, one of the world's largest shipping companies with 21,000 employees in 75 countries.

== Wilh. Wilhelmsen ==
He is the son of the company's former CEO and President Morten Wilhelm Wilhelmsen, who became one of the company's main owners along with his siblings on the death of their father Tom Wilhelmsen in 1978. Thomas Wilhelmsen belongs to the fifth generation of the Wilhelmsen family. He holds a degree in business administration. In 2018 Wilhelmsen announced a joint venture with the Norwegian high tech company Kongsberg Gruppen focused on autonomous vessels.

=== Ownership feud ===
Thomas Wilhelmsen owns the company with six cousins, an aunt and his two sisters. In 2020 seven female family members who own 60% of the family's capital in the company launched a battle for control over the Wilhelmsen company, and argued that they as women lack influence in the company because of a patriarchal ownership structure. In September 2020 his female relatives offered Wilhelmsen $353 million for his shares. According to Dagens Næringsliv the female relatives accused him of presiding over "a negative corporate culture where one person controls everything, weak corporate governance and an outdated ownership structure that deprives the real owners of control." Thomas Wilhelmsen has disputed that the corporate model is based on male preference, and rejected the offer from the female relatives.

== Personal life ==
Wilhelmsen is married to Pernille Mo, with whom he has three children.

He has a master's degree in business administration from Heriot-Watt University in Scotland and a management degree from IMD in Switzerland.
