= Thorry Kiær =

Norwegian industrialist

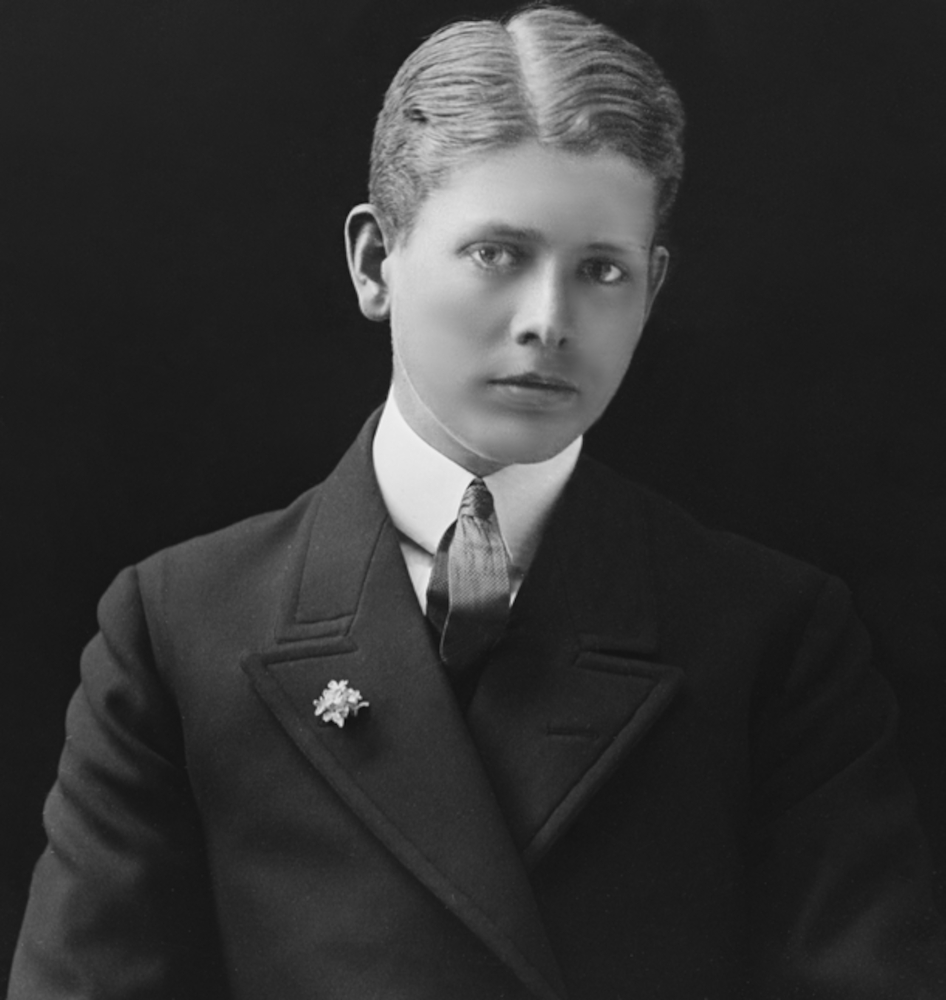
- Born: 6 January 1888; Aker, Norway
- Died: 29 June 1968 (aged 80); Oslo
- Occupation: Industrialist
- Known for: CEO of Orkla Mining Company
- Relatives: Dakky Kiær (sister)

Thorvald "Thorry" Meyer Kiær (6 January 1888 – 29 June 1968) was a Norwegian industrialist.

He was born in Aker to barrister Georg Fredrik Egidius Kiær and Julie Caroline Helene Løvenskiold. He was a brother of Dakky Kiær, and great-grandson of Otto Joachim Løvenskiold and Thorvald Meyer. In 1914 he married Ingrid Thaulow, a daughter of painter Frits Thaulow. Their daughter Annelise Knudtzon (1914–2006) was a textile artist.

From 1913 Kiær had various administrative positions in the family business, which included forestry and wood-processing industry. From 1938 to 1958 he was chief executive of Orkla Mining Company at Løkken Verk.
