= Tom Wilhelmsen (shipping magnate) =

Norwegian shipping magnate

Thomas Wilhelmsen (18 August 1911 in Tønsberg – 7 May 1978) was a Norwegian shipping magnate and the main owner of Norway's largest shipping company, Wilh. Wilhelmsen. He was also a noted philanthropist.

He was a son of ship-owner Wilhelm Wilhelmsen (born 1872) and a grandson of ship-owner Wilhelm Wilhelmsen (born 1839), who started the Wilh. Wilhelmsen company in 1861. After completing his education, he joined the family company in the early 1930s, and worked in Paris, Dunkerque, London, Antwerp and Hamburg. In 1938 he became a partner in the company. He was a member of several governmental committees. He was also the honorary consul-general for South Africa in Norway.

In 1965 he founded the Tom Wilhelmsen Foundation, which awards the Tom Wilhelmsen Opera and Ballet Prize. He was married to Valborg Cecilie Dedekam, and was the father of Wilhelm Wilhelmsen (born 1937), Finn Wilhelmsen (born 1939), Cecilie Paus (born 1943) and Helen Juell (born 1947), who became owners of the family firm, Wilh. Wilhelmsen, on their father's death in 1978.

The philanthropic Tom Wilhelmsen Foundation and the Tom Wilhelmsen Opera and Ballet Prize are named in his honour. He received Norway's highest honour, the Order of St. Olav, in 1975.

== Honours ==
- Commander of the Order of St. Olav (1975)

== Literature ==
- Leif B. Lillegaard (1986). Over alle hav. Oslo: Atheneum. ISBN 8273341267
