= Ole Paus (company) =

Norwegian iron and steel wholesale company

Ole Paus was a Norwegian iron and steel wholesale company, founded by the businessman and industrialist Ole Paus in Christiania in 1872. After his retirement, the company was known as Ole Paus Eftf. (Ole Paus' Successors) and owned by his son Christopher Blom Paus and grandson Per Paus.

The company operated until around 1970.

Its founder Ole Paus was the grandfather of General Ole Otto Paus and the great grandfather of singer-songwriter, author, poet and actor Ole Paus).

== Literature ==
- Norsk engroshandel, Norges grossistforbund, 1948
- Svend Bay-Schmith and O.R. Dahl (eds.): Næringslivets menn i Norden : biografisk håndbok over ledere av skandinaviske firmaer, Eckardts bokhandel, 1950
