= Wilhelm Wilhelmsen (1839–1910) =

Norwegian shipping magnate

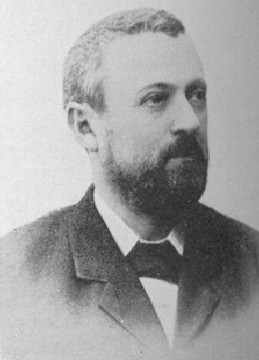
Wilhelm Wilhelmsen

Morten Wilhelm Wilhelmsen, known as Wilh. Wilhelmsen (12 July 1839 – 16 November 1910), was a Norwegian shipping magnate.

Wilhelm Wilhelmsen was born at Tønsberg in Vestfold, Norway. He was apprenticed with Fritz Heinrich Frølich (1807–1877) who was the founder of Christiania Bank and Kreditkasse. His commercial education continued at business firms in France, Belgium and the Netherlands.

In 1861, he founded a brokerage business in Tønsberg. His own career as a shipowner began with the purchase of the bark Mathilde in 1865. The shipping company, Wilh. Wilhelmsen which resulted would eventually become Norway's largest shipping company. By 1886, he had established himself as Tønsberg's largest shipowner.

He was also Mayor of Tønsberg in 1894 and French Consul. He received the Order of St. Olav (Knight First Class) and the French Legion of Honour. He was married to Catharine Lorentzen (1843–1919). They were the parents of shipowner Halfdan Wilhelmsen (1864–1923), factory owner Finn Wilhelmsen (1867–1951), shipowner Wilhelm Wilhelmsen (1872–1955), and businessman Axel Wilhelmsen (1881–1957).

== Related Literature ==
- The history of Wilh. Wilhelmsen
- Oscar A. Johnsen: Tønsberg historie, bind 3, 1952–1954
- Den Kongelige norske Sankt Olavs orden 1847–1947, Grøndahl & Søns Forlag, Oslo, 1947
