= Wilh. Wilhelmsen =

Shipping company

Wilh. Wilhelmsen Holding ASA

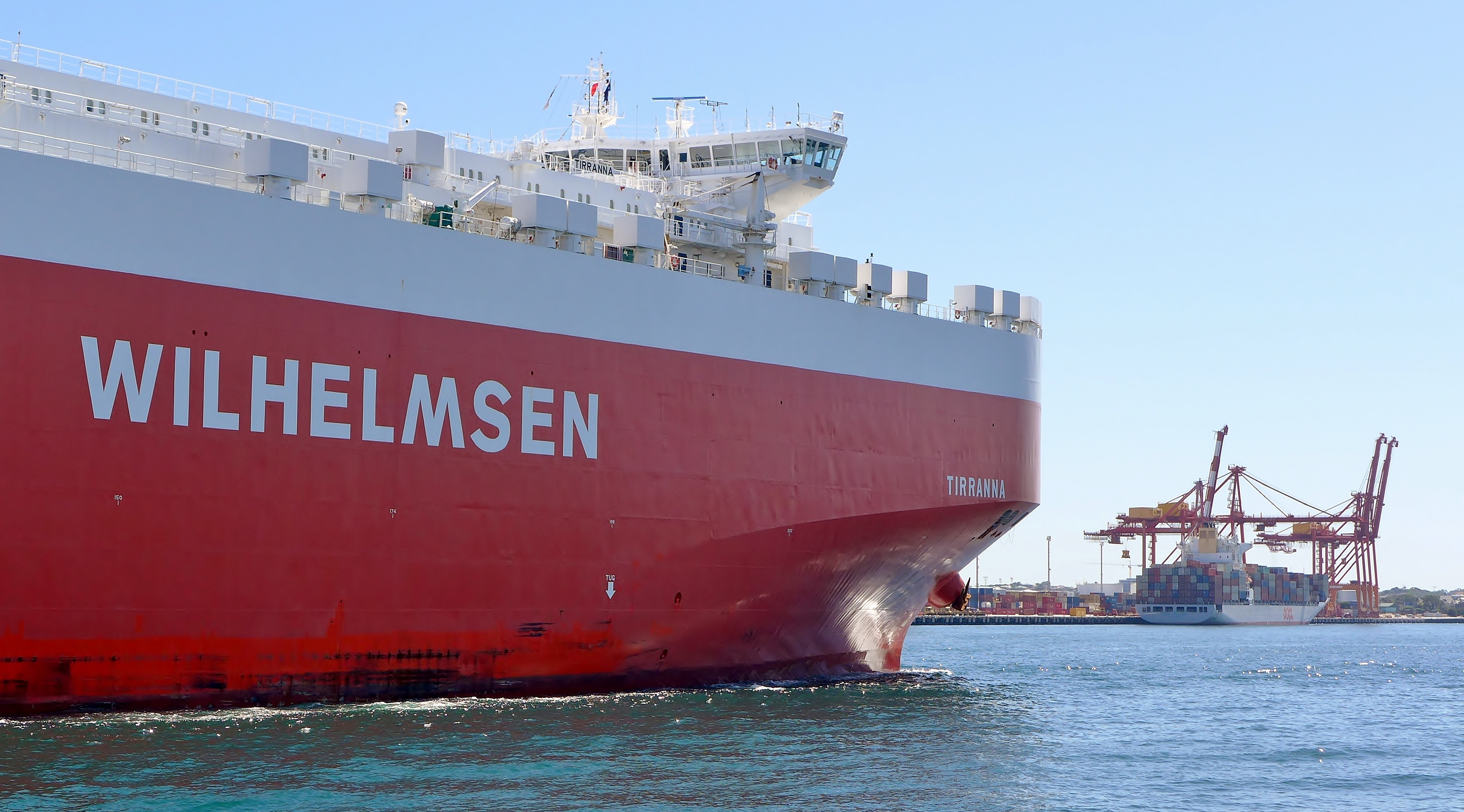
- Type: Allmennaksjeselskap
- Traded as: OSE: WWI
- Industry: Shipping
- Founded: 1861; 165 years ago
- Headquarters: Lysaker, Norway
- Key people: Thomas Wilhelmsen (CEO); Carl E. Steen (chair)
- Number of employees: Ca. 21,000
- Website: www.wilhelmsen.com

Wilh. Wilhelmsen Holding ASA (WWH) is a Norwegian multinational maritime group, headquartered in Lysaker, Norway. The group employs more than 21,000 people and has operations in 75 nations. The Wilhelmsen group operates the largest maritime network in the world, with over 2200 locations worldwide.

The WW group was founded on 1 October 1861 in Tønsberg. The company's first vessel was the barque Mathilde in 1865. In 1887 they bought the steamboat Talabot. It was only after they bought Talabot that the company started making profits. Thereafter all their ships have been named starting with the letter "T", often leading to the same name given repeatedly to different ships over time. For example, there have been at least four ships named Talabot ranging from tankers to ro-ro vessels.

Since 1978 the main owners have been the siblings Cecilie Paus and Helen Juell, and their now deceased brothers Wilhelm Wilhelmsen and Finn Wilhelmsen. Their children, the fifth generation of the Wilhelmsen family, are Thomas Wilhelmsen, Olympia Paus, Pontine Paus, Cathrine Løvenskiold Wilhelmsen, Hedvig Juell, Maren Juell, Hannah Wilhelmsen, Monica Wilhelmsen and Julie Wilhelmsen.

== History ==
=== Early history ===
On 30 September 1861, Morten Wilhelm Wilhelmsen and Jens Wilhelm Balchen agreed to establish a joint business in Tønsberg, on the western shore of the Oslofjord; it began trading on 1 October. Wilhelmsen was 22; the age of majority in Norway was then 25, and he could not obtain a trading licence in his own name. The business was therefore conducted through Balchen's firm, with Wilhelmsen holding a power of attorney and the two partners equally competent to decide commercial matters. Its main activities in this period were banking transactions and freight fixtures. Wilhelmsen reached the age of 25 in July 1864 and dissolved the partnership with Balchen in early 1865, continuing the business in his own premises under the name Wilh. Wilhelmsen. (Note: News of Norway dates the dissolution of the partnership to 1864, three years after its formation; Kolltveit and Bangsmoen place Wilhelmsen's coming of age in July 1864 and the dissolution in early 1865.) An advertisement of 1871 listed the firm's services as freight fixtures, the purchase and sale of ships, and insurance agencies.

Wilhelmsen's first ship was the wooden barque Mathilde, built at Saint-Malo in 1840. He bought a two-sevenths share in May 1865 and acted as the shipping partnership's corresponding owner; when the ship's master retired in 1871, Wilhelmsen acquired his equal share. By 1886 Wilh. Wilhelmsen was Tønsberg's largest shipowner, with 11 vessels of 6,165 net register tons. Wilhelmsen's eldest son, Halfdan Wilhelmsen, entered the firm in the mid-1880s. At the end of 1887 the firm bought its first steamship, the 1,880-ton Talabot. The purchase proved profitable, and from then on most ships in the fleet were given names beginning with the letter T.

Halfdan Wilhelmsen was admitted as a partner in 1890 and became the head of the business, whose fleet grew under his leadership around international liner shipping. The Norway–Mexico Gulf Line became operational in 1907. When the founder died in 1910 the firm owned 30 steamers of more than 160,000 deadweight tons and was the largest shipping company in Norway. In 1911 Wilhelmsen and other Norwegian owners formed the Den Norske Afrika og Australia Linie (Norwegian Africa and Australia Line), which concluded non-competition agreements with lines on the European continent, giving it a dominant position in Scandinavia in return for leaving Continental cargoes alone.

In 1912 the company entered the Norwegian tanker trade, ordering two tankers to carry oil from the United States to Europe; its involvement in the trade was brief.

=== World War I and interwar period ===
Wilhelmsen lost several ships to hostile action during World War I. Most of the company's trampers sailed in US waters for American charterers, but a number of its UK-based tankers were requisitioned by the British government. Wilhelmsen temporarily restructured into a series of single-ship companies due to concerns that the entire fleet might be requisitioned by the Americans.

After the war, the company moved its head office from Tønsberg to Oslo, then the center of the Scandinavian shipping industry. Halfdan Wilhelmsen died in 1923, and leadership of the company passed to his younger brother, "Captain" Wilhelm Wilhelmsen. Throughout the 1920s, Wilhelmsen operated liner services across Scandinavia and into ports in the United States, Australia, and the Far East.

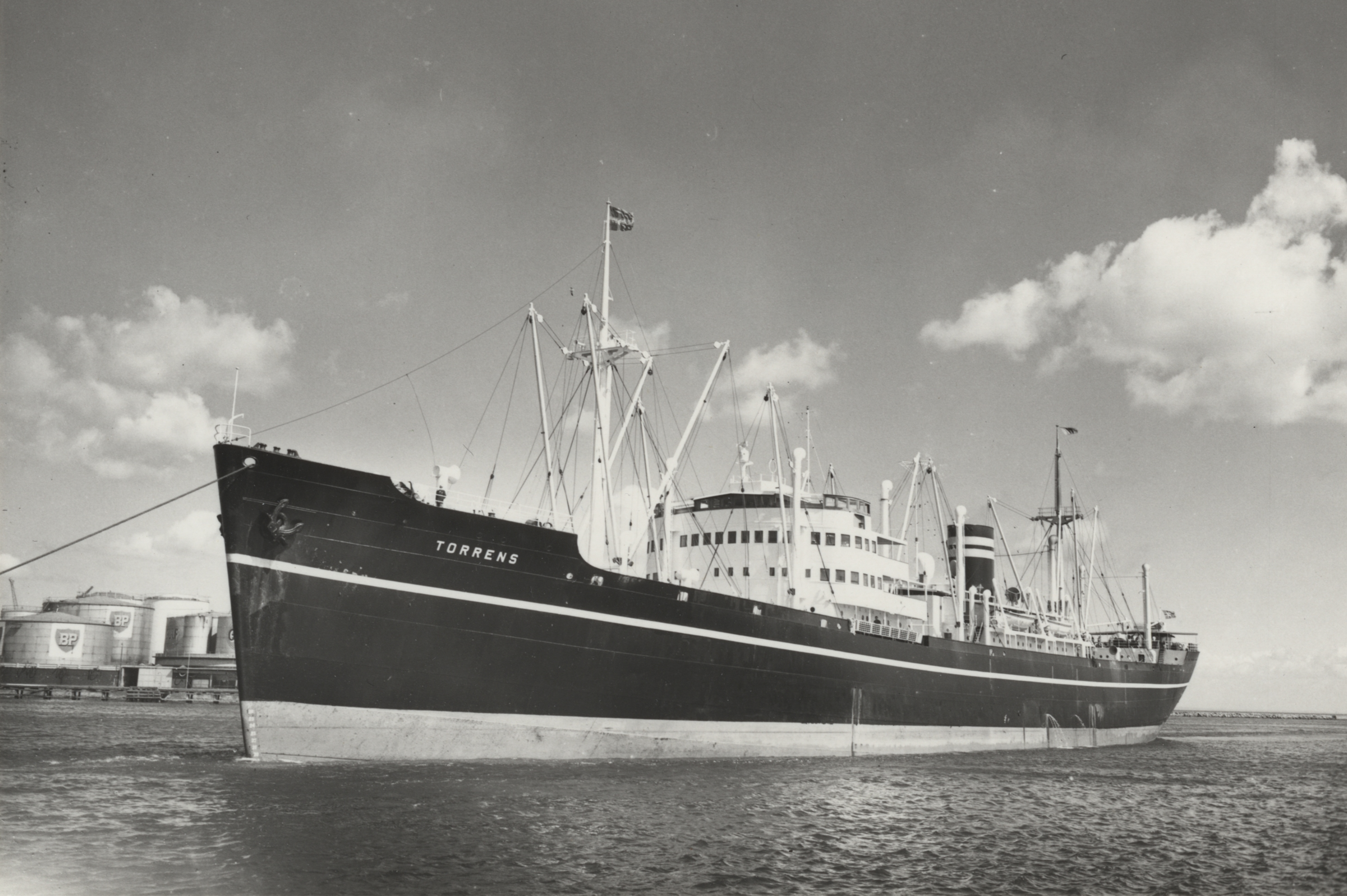
The Torrens of 1939

Between 1920 and 1940, the company took delivery of 59 newly built cargo liners. By this time, it was the biggest shipowner in Norway. The business was dominated by liner shipping: the company only possessed one tanker.

=== World War II and postwar rebuilding, 1940–1964 ===
The German occupation of Norway began in April 1940. At the time, the Wilhelmsen fleet accounted for around 7% of Norway's total merchant fleet. The Norwegian Shipping and Trade Mission (Nortraship) was established in April 1940 by the Norwegian government-in-exile to requisition and manage the Norwegian merchant fleet outside German-controlled areas. Nortraship used Wilhelmsen ships to support the Allied war effort, providing troop and ammunition transport in both the European and Pacific theaters.

By the end of the war, 29 of Wilhelmsen's ships had been lost, amounting to 54% of its tonnage, and more than 50 of its sailors were killed. By mid-summer 1946, the company had ordered 18 motor vessels and resumed its overseas liner operations.

Captain Wilhelm Wilhelmsen died in 1955, and Niels Werring became senior partner. By 1961 the company owned 72 vessels, had a headquarters staff of 305 and some 3,150 officers and seamen, and was represented by about 450 agents worldwide. Wilhelm Wilhelmsen, the great-grandson of the company founder, became a partner in 1964.

=== Containerisation and diversification (1969–1988) ===
Demand for the seaborne carriage of cars grew during the 1970s, and with it the use of roll-on/roll-off (ro-ro) ships, which carry wheeled cargo that is driven on and off the vessel. Wilhelmsen expanded its ro-ro and container capacity chiefly through consortia with other Scandinavian owners.

In 1969 Wilhelmsen joined the Danish East Asiatic Company and the Swedish Transatlantic to launch ScanAustral, a joint service that began with five combined container and ro-ro vessels. The same year, Wilhelmsen, Fearnley & Eger and A. F. Klaveness established Barber Lines A/S to combine their liner services to East Asia. In 1971 Wilhelmsen, East Asiatic, the Swedish East Asiatic Company and Transatlantic formed the Scanservice group to operate a container service from Gothenburg to East Asia. The Dutch line Nedlloyd joined soon afterwards, and the group was renamed ScanDutch; the French Messageries Maritimes and the Malaysian Malaysian International Shipping Corporation joined later. Managed from Copenhagen, the consortium marketed and priced its services jointly, in effect trading as a single carrier.

Wilhelmsen acquired full ownership of Barber Lines in 1975. In the same year it founded Barber Ship Management in Hong Kong to support the Barber Blue Sea service between East Asia and the United States; the business was the forerunner of Wilhelmsen Ship Management. In 1983 ship management was reorganised as a separate division comprising Barber Ship Management in Hong Kong, Wilh. Wilhelmsen Ship Management in Oslo and Wilh. Wilhelmsen Technical Consultants (Wiltec).

From the 1970s Wilhelmsen also diversified into offshore oil services, acquiring a number of drilling platforms as exploration for oil and gas expanded. Norway opened the Norwegian continental shelf north of the 62nd parallel to petroleum exploration in 1979. In 1980 the company ordered a semisubmersible drilling rig from Götaverken of Sweden at a cost of about US$85 million. By 1985 offshore activities accounted for 64% of group profits, but the slump that followed in the second half of the decade brought the group close to collapse and forced a financial restructuring. Wilhelmsen responded by concentrating again on liner shipping, and on ro-ro services in particular. It left the ScanDutch consortium in 1988, selling its share to Nedlloyd.

=== 1989 Partnair Crash ===
In September 1989, Partnair Flight 394 crashed en route to the naming ceremony for a new Wilhelmsen Lines ship in Hamburg. The flight had been chartered by the shipping company. Fifty employees were killed, including the top two levels of management plus the five airline crew.

=== Restructuring and car-carrier expansion ===
Ingar Skaug became Wilhelmsen's CEO in 1990. He had previously served as COO of Scandinavian Airlines. Wilhelmsen was struggling to operate at this time. A year after the tragedy, Skaug began implementing organizational changes, particularly with regard to the decision-making process. Wilhelmsen had historically operated with a hierarchical, top-down management style, where leadership dictated tasks and decisions. Skaug reshaped this structure, encouraging employees to take responsibility for initiatives and make their own decisions. Skaug oversaw the relocation of Wilhelmsen's headquarters to Lysaker in 1995, a move which symbolized a new beginning for the company.

Over the next decade, Wilhelmsen significantly deepened its roll-on/roll-off partnerships through strategic acquisitions and the formation of key joint ventures. Wilhelmsen acquired the Norwegian America Line in 1995 and assumed full control of its Norwegian Specialized Autocarriers (NOSAC) brand in 1996. The deal established Wilhelmsen as the largest car carrier operator in the world. Together, Wilhelmsen and NOSAC carried about 500,000 vehicles per year for major automotive companies, including Ford, Mercedes, and Volvo.

In 1999, the commercial activities of Wilhelmsen Lines and Wallenius Lines merged to create Wallenius Wilhelmsen Logistics. This strategic consolidation formed the basis of the current Wallenius Wilhelmsen.

In November 2002, Wallenius Wilhelmsen Logistics acquired the car carrier division of Hyundai Merchant Marine. This led to the formation of EUKOR Car Carriers, a Korea-based carrier where Wallenius Wilhelmsen group eventually held an 80% share, with Hyundai holding 20%.

During the early hours of 14 December 2002, MV Tricolor was sailing from Zeebrugge, Belgium to Southampton, U.K., with a load of nearly 2,871 brand new BMW, Volvo and SAAB automobiles. She collided in the English Channel with MV Kariba, a 1982 Bahamian-flagged container ship. Kariba continued on, but Tricolor sank and required salvage by wreck-cutting. No casualties occurred.

=== Tampa affair ===
In 2001, the Wilhelmsen-operated MV Tampa freighter rescued 438 asylum seekers, primarily from Afghanistan. The Howard government refused to grant the ship permission to land on Australian soil. The incident led to a prolonged legal battle and a diplomatic dispute between Australia, Norway, and Indonesia.

The crew of the MV Tampa received international recognition for the rescue effort, most notably the UNHCR's Nansen Refugee Award in 2002. Lloyd's List and The Nautical Institute both honored the ship's captain, Arne Rinnan, as "Captain of the Year".

=== 2010s to present ===
In 2010, Wilh. Wilhelmsen Holding ASA underwent a major restructuring, establishing itself as a new parent company and separating its shipping/logistics operations into a new entity, Wilh. Wilhelmsen ASA. Thomas Wilhelmsen became Group CEO for the Wilhelmsen group, leading Wilh. Wilhelmsen Holding ASA, and also chair of the new shipping and logistics company, Wilh. Wilhelmsen ASA, while Jan-Eyvin Wang became CEO.

In 2012, Wilhelmsen acquired a 35.4% stake in NorSea Group, a Norwegian offshore supply base and logistics company. The move was part of a strategy to increase exposure to the oil and gas energy market, supplementing their existing maritime services. At the time, NorSea was controlled by Eidesvik Eiendomsinvest AS and Simon Møkster Eiendom AS. Wilhelmsen's ownership share increased to 40% in 2014. In 2017, Wilhelmsen became the majority owner with a 72% ownership share. In 2022, Wilhelmsen and its New Energy segment increased the stake in NorSea to 99%.

In 2015, Wilhelmsen Ships Service acquired Timm, a 240-year-old Norwegian rope, cable, and cordage manufacturer.

In 2016, Wilhelmsen and Wallenius announced a merger. The deal included the creation of a new entity, Wallenius Wilhelmsen, that included the companies' jointly owned entities Wallenius Wilhelmsen Logistics, EUKOR Car Carriers, and American Roll-on Roll-off Carrier. The merger was completed in 2017. That same year, Dag Schjerven retired as president and CEO of Wilhelmsen Maritime Services. As part of a broader reorganization of the group management team, the role of president was restructured into new industrial investment roles.

In 2018, Wilhelmsen launched Raa Labs, a startup focused on digitizing operational vessel data. That same year Wilhelmsen and Kongsberg Maritime established a joint venture, Massterly, for managing autonomous shipping vessels.

In 2020, Wilhelmsen Ship Management took a 50% stake in Ahrenkiel Steamship, a subsidiary of Hamburg-based MPC Capital AG. In 2022 that stake increased to 80%, and Ahrenkiel was rebranded as Barber Ship Management, reviving the name of Wilhelmsen's original tanker ship management service.

In September 2020, Wilhelmsen announced the acquisition of a 25% stake in Edda Wind, the Ostensjo Group’s offshore wind company. In March 2021, Wilhelmsen exercised an option to increase its holding to 50% of the company. Following the increased stake, Wilhelmsen and Østensjø announced plans for an IPO to raise capital for fleet expansion. Due to frustration with slow growth rates and operational struggles, in April 2025 Wilhelmsen joined investors John Fredriksen and Idan Ofer to initiate a buyout of Edda Wind. They aimed to take the company private, with their group holding roughly 84.3% of the company at the time of the announcement. In August 2025, Edda Wind was delisted from the stock market.

In October 2022, Wilhelmsen Port Services agreed to acquire 100% of Vopak Agencies and 50% of its digital software company, Diize. The deal was completed in February 2023 and allowed Wilhelmsen to expand its services in Northwest Europe.

In 2023, Wilhelmsen Ship Management and Affinity Shipping launched a joint venture, Hecla Emissions Management, to help shipping operators comply with EU ETS and FuelEU Maritime regulations. The next year the venture released a platform for trading compliance balances as tokens.

In December 2023, Wilhelmsen Ship Management and MPC Capital agreed to acquire Zeaborn Ship Management from Zech Maritime. The deal was completed in 2024, and allowed Wilhelmsen to establish a hub for third-party ship management in Hamburg, Germany. That same year, Wilhelmsen launched a new brand, Navadan, that consolidated its recently acquired tank and hold clearning companies.

A series of Norwegian court decisions in the early 2020s upheld Thomas Wilhelmsen’s control of Wilh. Wilhelmsen Holding ASA, the holding company behind the Oslo-listed Wilh Wilhelmsen. The Wilhelmsen family shareholder case concerned disagreements over governance and distribution policies in privately held companies affiliated with the Wilhelmsen group. Several family members sought dissolution or a compulsory buyout of their shares, arguing that the company structure limited their influence and access to value. The courts assessed issues related to ownership rights, corporate structure, and long-term financial management. Trials in the district court and later in the court of appeal all resulted in the existing ownership structure remaining intact. Thomas Wilhelmsen has maintained more than half of the share capital and close to two-thirds of the voting rights in Wilh. Wilhelmsen Holding ASA, and this position was strengthened by a 2025 capital reduction that lifted his total holding to about 54.6% of shares and 63.8% of votes.

== Current operations ==
Wilh. Wilhelmsen Holding ASA is an industrial holding company in the maritime sector, organised as a listed public limited company on Oslo Børs. The group operates through a portfolio of fully and partly owned entities, with business activities divided into three operating segments: maritime services, new energy, and strategic holdings and investments.

The maritime services segment is the key revenue driver, and operates through subsidiary companies including Wilhelmsen Ships Service, Wilhelmsen Port Services, and Wilhelmsen Ship Management.

The new energy segment includes investments in the oil and gas sector as well as offshore wind and other renewables. Wilhelmsen owns 99% of the NorSea Group, a company that provides logistics and supply base services to the energy industry, including offshore oil and gas and renewable energy sectors like wind and aquaculture. Wilhelmsen holds stakes in Edda Wind, a joint venture with Geveran Trading and EPS Ventures providing offshore wind operations support, and Reach Subsea, a company offering remote subsea services to energy clients. Massterly, a joint venture with Kongsberg Maritime, operates a remote operation centre in Horten.

The strategic holdings and investments segment includes the company's ownership stakes in other businesses, most notably Wallenius Wilhelmsen and Hyundai Glovis. Wilhelmsen previously managed its majority ownership stake in Hyundai Glovis through Treasure ASA, an investment vehicle listed on the Oslo Børs. At the end of 2025, Treasure ASA was dissolved and Wilh. Wilhelmsen Holding assumed the Korean shares directly.

The company is headquartered in Lysaker and operates in 53 countries. Thomas Wilhelmsen is the CEO. Carl E. Steen is chair of the board.

== Wilhelmsen family ==
The company's owners, the Wilhelmsen family, are descended from Wilhelm Zachariassen Holst (ca. 1732–1807), who worked at Vallø saltverk. His great-grandson was shipping magnate (Morten) Wilhelm Wilhelmsen (1839–1910), the founder of Wilh. Wilhelmsen. He was the father of ship-owner Halfdan Wilhelmsen (1864–1923), factory owner Finn Wilhelmsen (1867–1951), ship-owner Wilhelm Wilhelmsen (1872–1955) and businessman Axel Wilhelmsen (1881–1957).

Halfdan Wilhelmsen was the father of Mistress of the Robes Else Werring (1905–89), married to ship-owner Niels Roth Heyerdahl Werring (1897–1990). Wilhelm Wilhelmsen (1872) was the father of ship-owner Tom Wilhelmsen (1911–78), who was the father of the owners of the Wilh. Wilhelmsen company: Morten Wilhelm Wilhelmsen (1937–2020), Cecilie Paus (born 1943) and Helen Juell (born 1947). Cecilie Paus is the mother of fashion designer Pontine Paus and of Olympia Paus, wife of Alexander Nix.

== Ships gallery ==
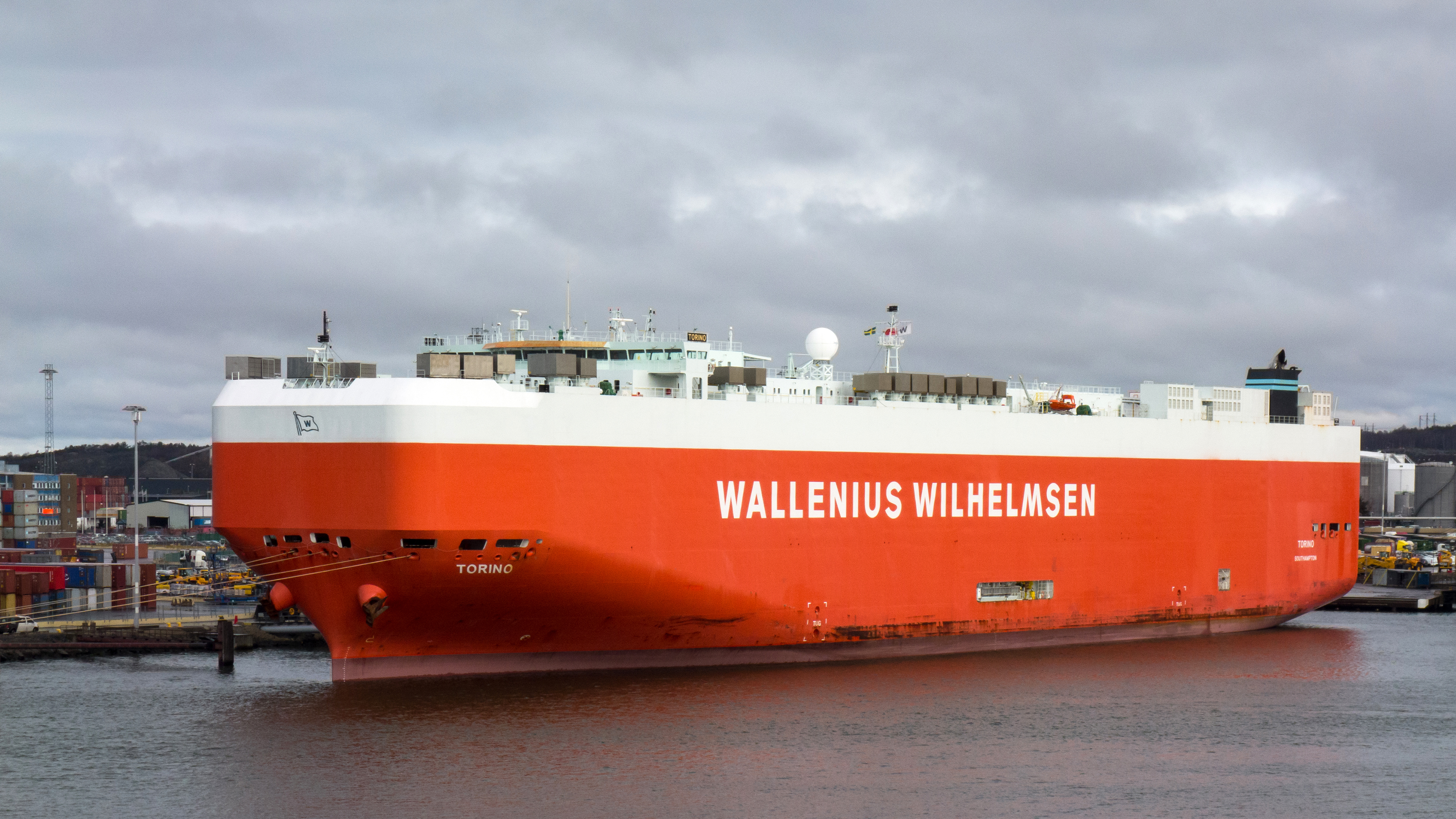
Torino

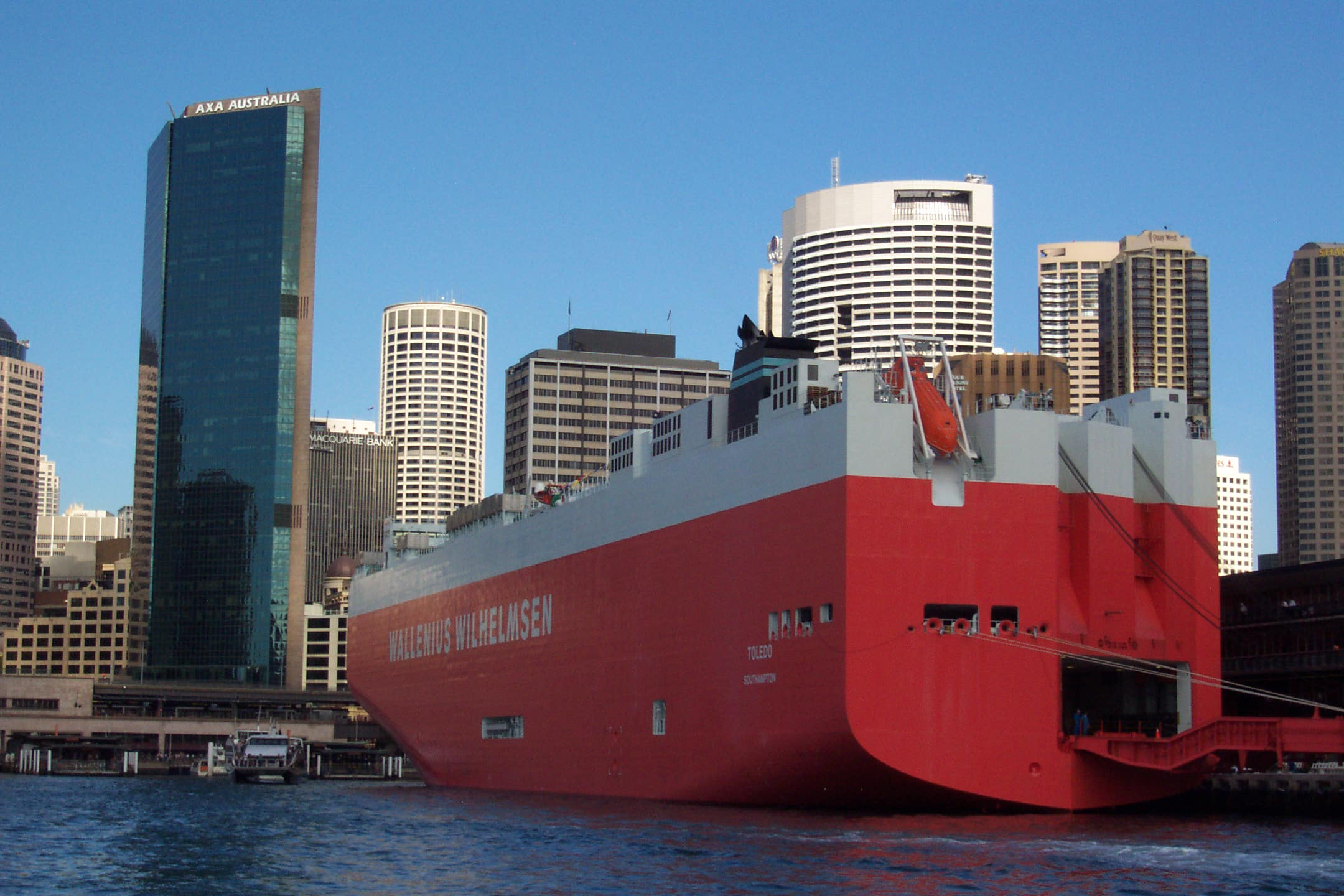
Toledo

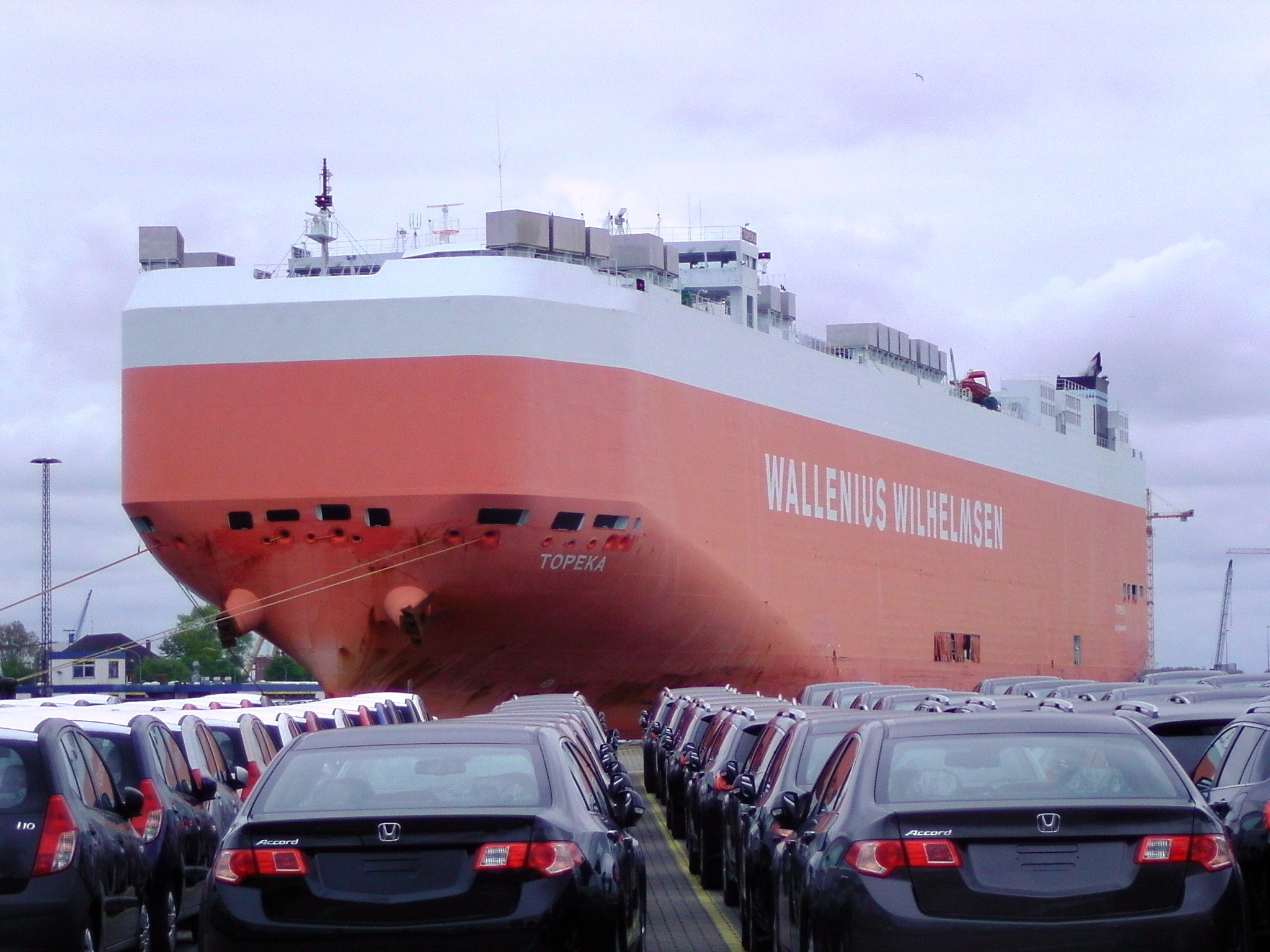
Topeka

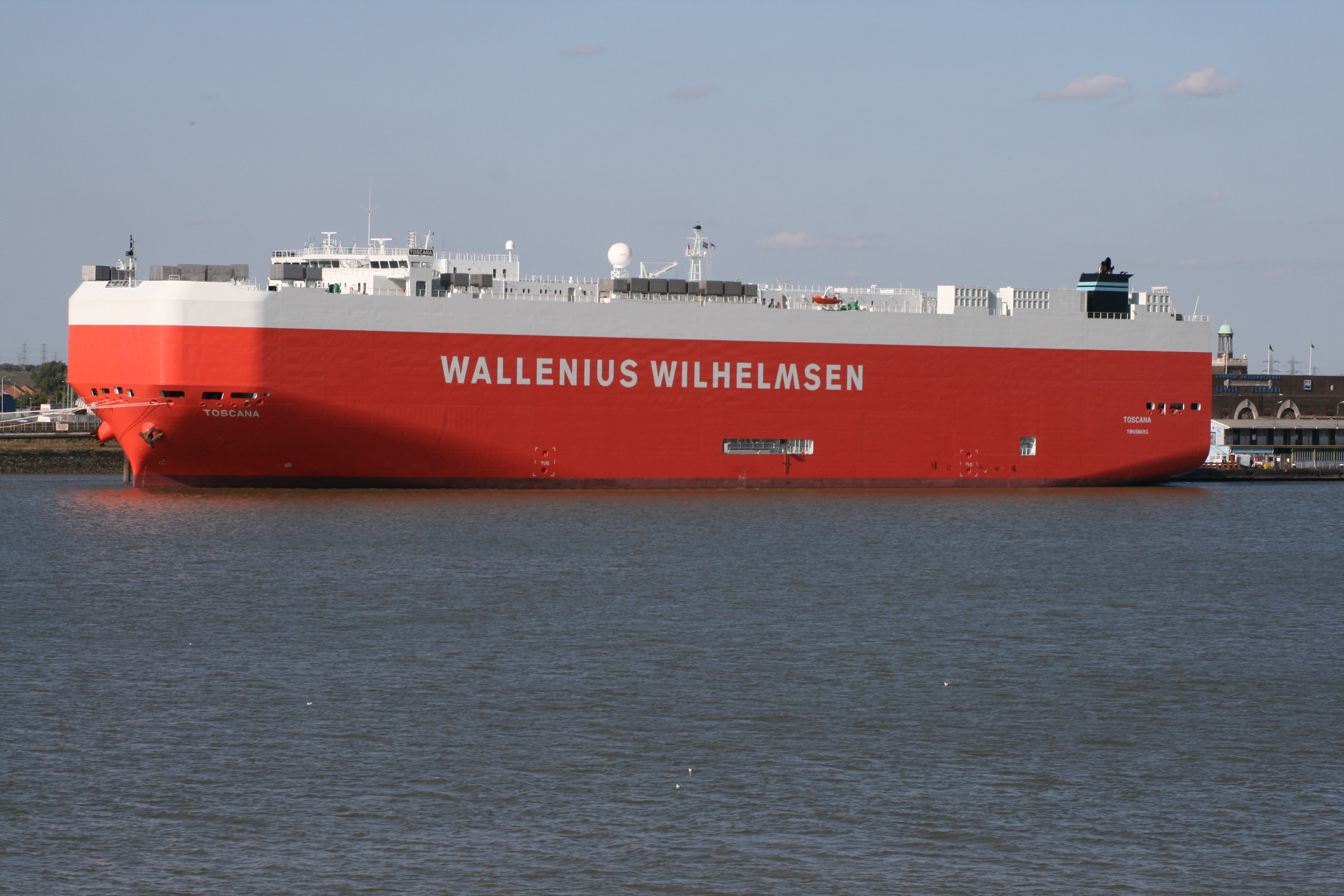
Toscana

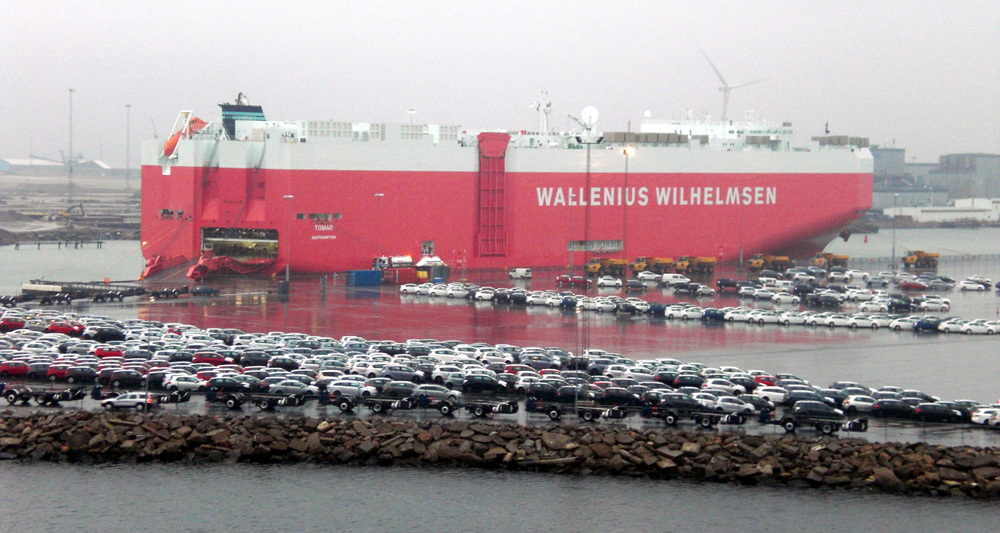
Tomar

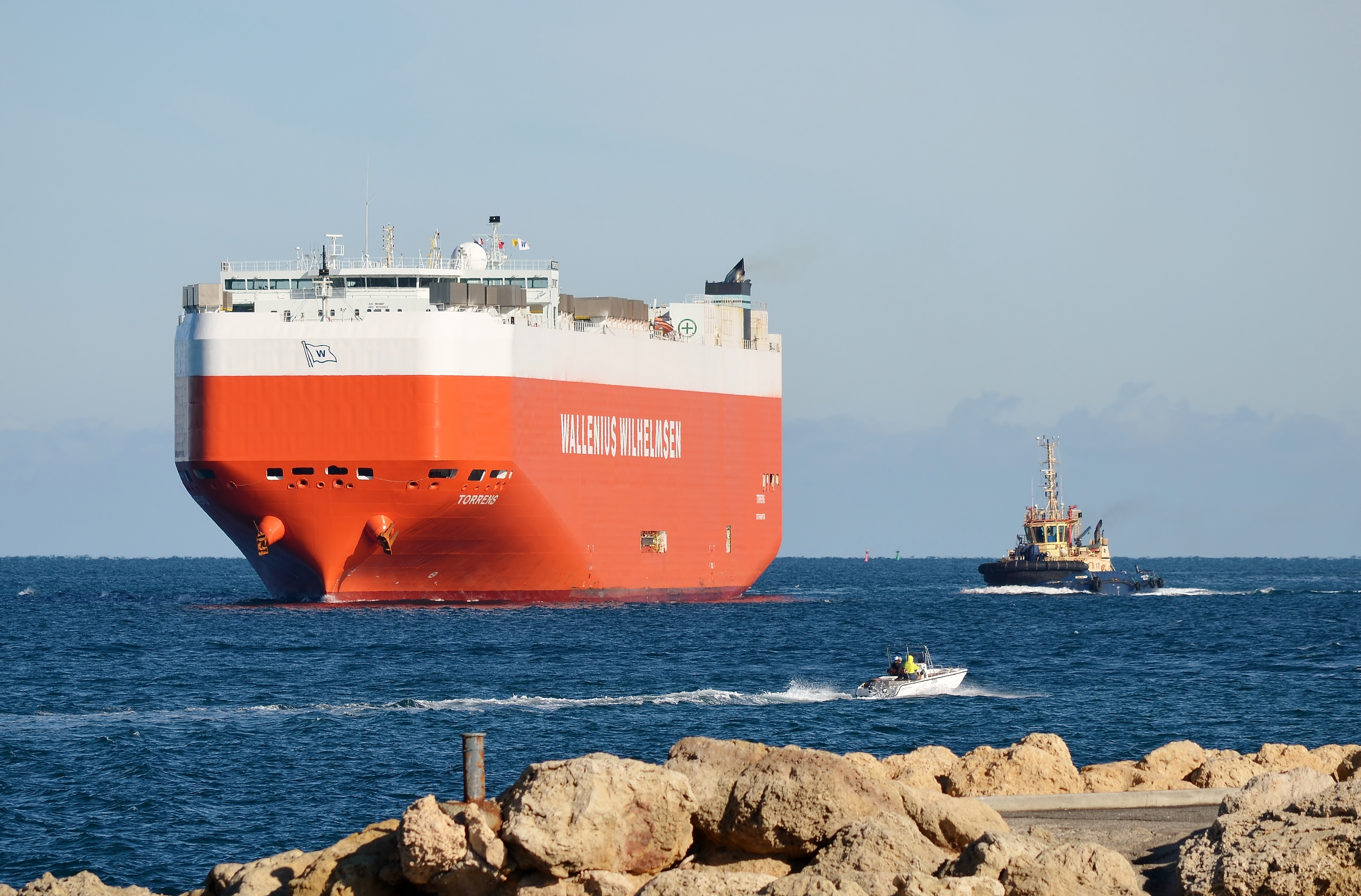
Torrens

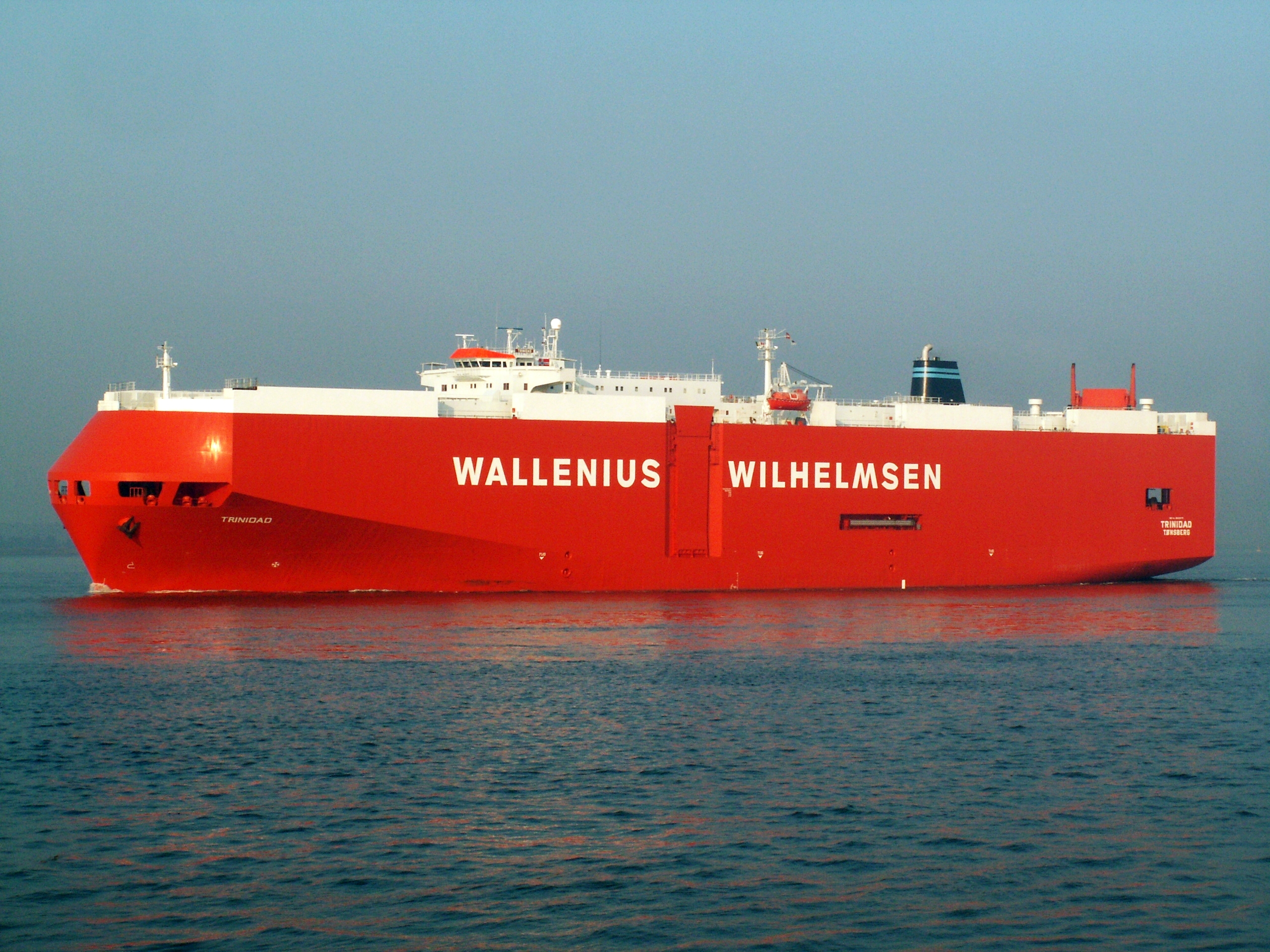
Trinidad

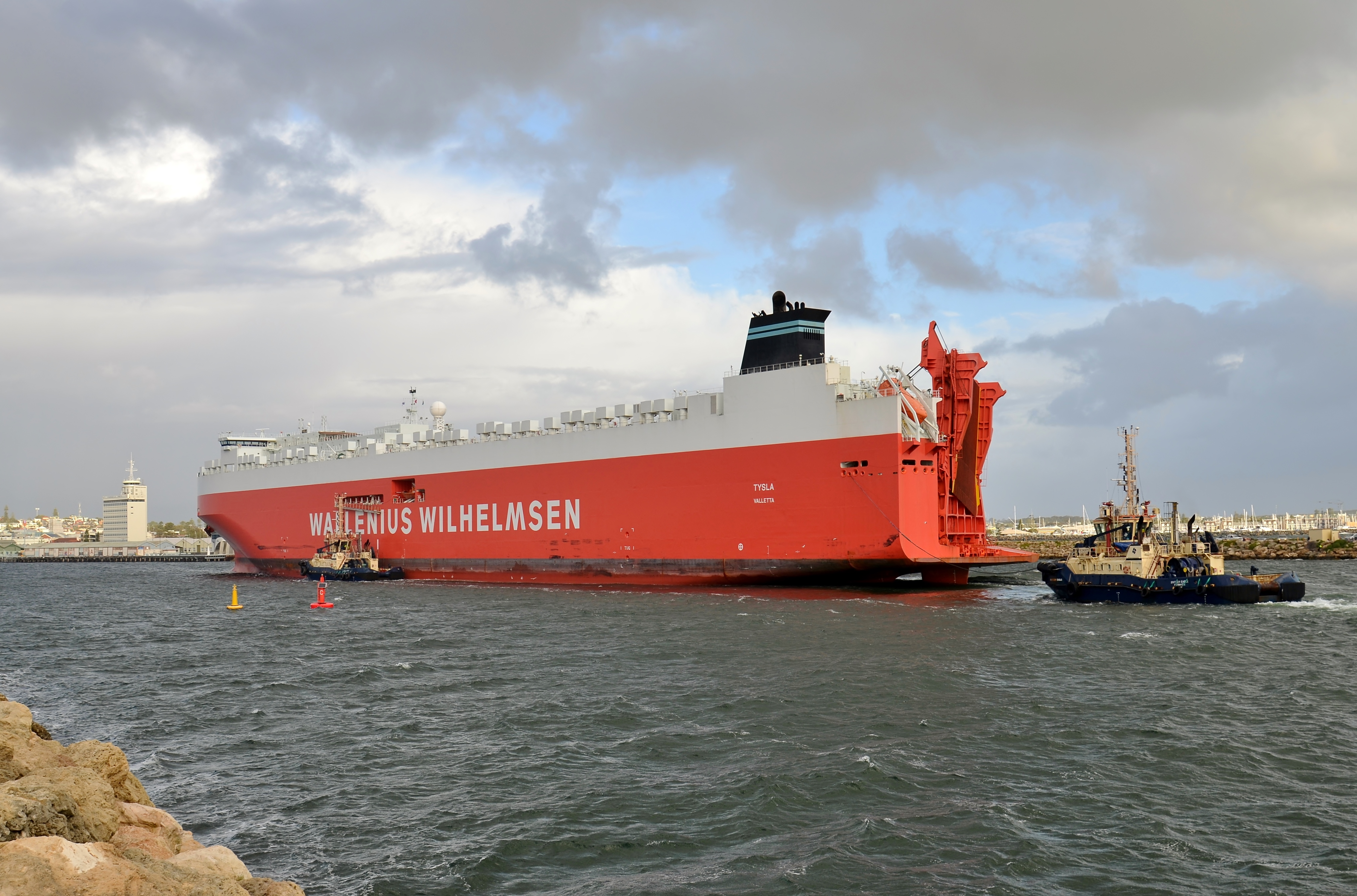
Tysla

== See also ==
- LPGC Ayame
- MV Liberty
- MV Tampa
- MV Taiko
- Wallenius Lines
- List of roll-on/roll-off vessel accidents
