= Ibsen: "... den mærkelige mand" =

2019 book about Henrik Ibsen by Sverre Mørkhagen

Ibsen: "… den mærkelige mand"
- Author: Sverre Mørkhagen
- Publisher: Gyldendal Norsk Forlag
- Publication date: 2019
- Pages: 863
- ISBN: 9788205488991

Ibsen: "... den mærkelige mand" is a biography of Henrik Ibsen, written by Sverre Mørkhagen and published by Gyldendal Norsk Forlag in 2019. The book sparked intense debate among Ibsen scholars and the public in 2019. Shortly after its publication, it received a very positive review in Dagbladet and was awarded a prize that called the book the "ultimate Ibsen biography". However, later in the fall of 2019, it was heavily criticized by leading Ibsen scholars who argued that the book presented an outdated and inaccurate portrayal of Ibsen, ignored recent Ibsen scholarship, and contained unsustainable conjecture and factual errors. Jørgen Haave and other Ibsen researchers described the book as a setback for the academic study of Henrik Ibsen's life and work, due to its recycling of myths and misunderstandings.

== Content and reception ==
The book is a comprehensive biography that aims to present Ibsen's entire life and work. Each chapter is named after a chapter in Ibsen's play Peer Gynt.

The book was the subject of significant debate among academics in 2019. After its release, it received positive reviews from non-specialists, including a very favorable review by Marius Wulfsberg in Dagbladet, where the book was described as "a masterpiece". That same fall, Mørkhagen received the Riksmål Society's Literature Prize for the book, and the jury described it as "the ultimate Ibsen biography". However, later in the fall, the criticism from academic circles studying Henrik Ibsen's life and work grew stronger.

Ibsen researcher and director of the Henrik Ibsen Museum in Skien, Jørgen Haave, was critical of the book and argued that it presented a highly misleading image of Ibsen, recycled old myths that had been debunked, contained many errors and misunderstandings, and did not incorporate Ibsen research from the last decade before publication, including the book Familien Ibsen (2017). Haave called the book "a speculative and sloppy story" that "is a depressing setback for Ibsen research", giving "a completely wrong impression of Henrik Ibsen's life and work". According to Haave, the book undermines efforts to document and communicate Ibsen's biography due to its careless use of sources, providing an "uncritical and imprecise" recounting that the author "remembers reading and 'enriches' stories with a good dose of his own invention".

A group of genealogists investigated the book's claim that Ibsen fathered a daughter with a thirteen-year-old and demonstrated that the claim was false.

Ibsen scholar and director of the Ibsen Museum in Oslo, Erik Henning Edvardsen, wrote that "Mørkhagen's attempt to write an Ibsen biography has so far sparked debate around the peculiar idea of opening the possibility that Henrik Ibsen as a 15-year-old could have impregnated a 13-year-old girl. [...] Mørkhagen retrieves all the missteps found in the secondary literature. [...] Small and large blunders follow each other quickly throughout the work. [...] It's incomprehensible that Gyldendal alone trusted the author's judgment and released the work without any quality control from an Ibsen scholar." Edvardsen wrote that Mørkhagen "exclusively revitalizes outdated errors and has no idea what has happened in Ibsen research since 1977".

History professor and Ibsen researcher Narve Fulsås wrote that "Sverre Mørkhagen does not let research or new sources stand in the way of his good story about a suffering Henrik Ibsen. [...] [The book is] primarily a disappointing testimony to the failure of humanistic Ibsen scholarship. Here, everything seems to have bounced off the narrative that Mørkhagen has already decided on."

The Aftenposten reviewer, literature professor Henning Howlid Wærp, was critical of the book and argued that it lacked a clear purpose: "[Mørkhagen justifies] the biography with the assertion that Ibsen's authorship must not 'end up in the shadow of oblivion.' That is hardly a risk."

Mørkhagen rejected the criticism, stating, "I don't fully agree with the fact dogmatism that characterizes parts of the Ibsen community." In an interview, he said the Ibsen scholars "have decided to bark and snap at me with astonishing rage". Later, Mørkhagen stated that he and Ivo de Figueiredo represented "a bolder Ibsen tradition". Ibsen researcher Ivo de Figueiredo distanced himself from this, stating that "unless you miss more Trump rhetoric in historical writing, it is difficult to see Sverre Mørkhagen's confrontation with Ibsen research's 'fact-based dogmatism' as progress". He agreed with Haave's points but felt the criticism of Mørkhagen's book was so aggressive "you'd think the Brekkeparken Museum was under siege". Figueiredo also noted that Wulfsberg's review of the book "makes you wonder what kind of research standards are upheld at the National Library".
