= Rosmersholm =

Play by Henrik Ibsen

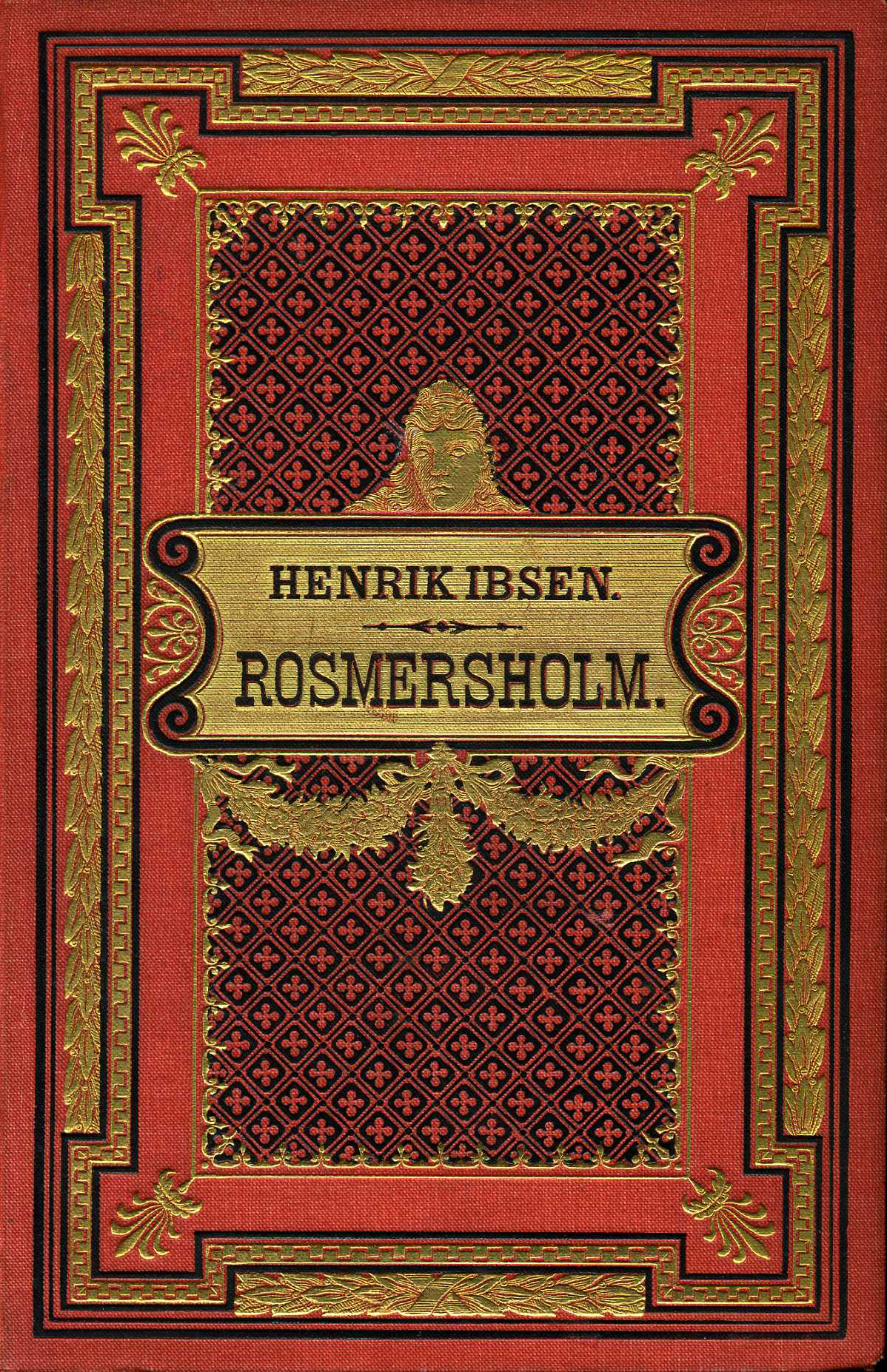
- 1886 edition of Rosmersholm
- Original language: Danish
- Written by: Henrik Ibsen
- Characters: Johannes Rosmer; Rebecca West; Professor Kroll; Ulrik Brendel; Peder Mortensgaard; Mrs. Helseth
- Subject: Aristocrat who converted to liberalism
- Genre: Well-made play
- Setting: Rosmer's Manor

Rosmersholm (pronounced [ˈrɔ̀sməʂˌhɔɫm]) is an 1886 play written by Norwegian playwright Henrik Ibsen. It tells the story of Johannes Rosmer, an aristocratic former clergyman and owner of the Rosmersholm manor who is haunted by his wife's suicide and his own idealistic desires for societal reform, and Rebecca West, a strong-willed companion who challenges his convictions, leading to a deep exploration of morality, political activism, and the struggle for personal and social change amidst a backdrop of intense personal and political turmoil. Rosmersholm has been described as one of Ibsen's darkest, most complex, subtle, beautiful, mystical, multilayered and ambiguous plays. The play explores the tension between old and new, between liberation and servitude, between narratives, action or inaction, and of "what to do with ourselves when the world collapses around us." According to Ibsen scholar and translator James McFarlane, Rosmersholm and The Wild Duck are "often to be observed in the critics' estimates vying with each other as rivals for the top place among Ibsen's works."

Ibsen scholar Jon Nygaard writes that the loss of joy of life is an underlying theme of several of Ibsen's plays, including Rosmersholm, in which "the spirit of the dead and the aristocracy of officials [lingers heavily] over the manor [and] the Rosmerian view of life ennobles man – but it kills happiness". A key theme in Rosmersholm and other plays was, according to Nygaard, "the joy of life that was lost – and the new Puritan Civil Servant State that was coming. It was the spirit of civil servants from Upper Telemark, the Paus family."

The play was written in Danish—the common written language of Denmark and Norway at the time—and originally published in Copenhagen by the Danish publisher Gyldendal.

== Characters ==
- Johannes Rosmer (Anglicized as John Rosmer in some English translations), a former clergyman and owner of Rosmersholm, a manor
- Rebecca West, a resident at Rosmersholm
- Professor Kroll, Rosmer's brother-in-law
- Ulrik Brendel, Rosmer's childhood tutor
- Peder Mortensgaard, a newspaper editor whom Rosmer, while still a priest, denounced for adultery
- Mrs. Helseth, housekeeper at Rosmersholm

== Plot ==
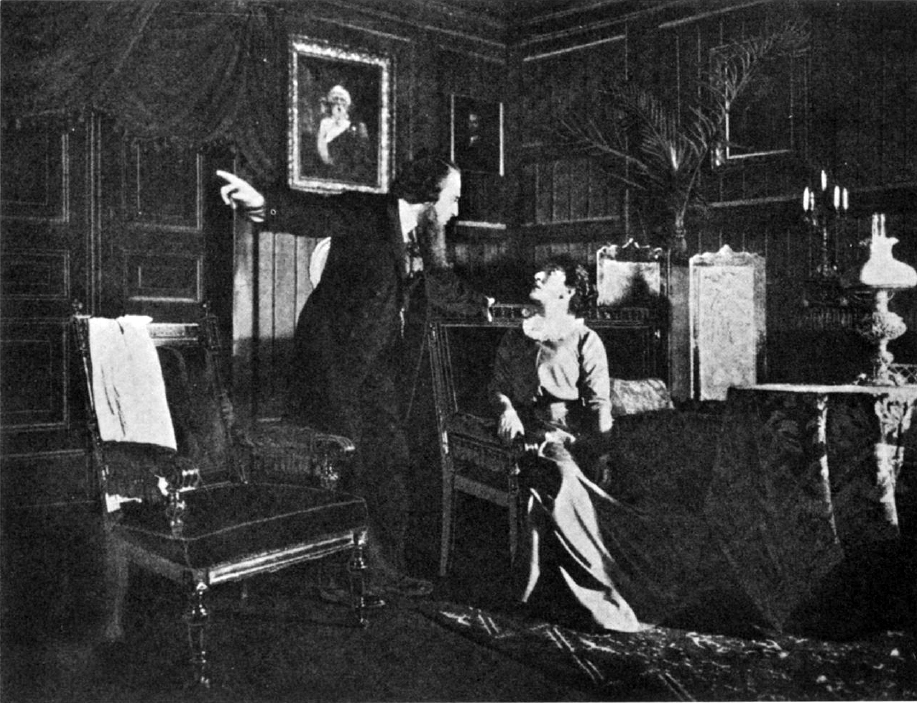
Rosmersholm, Lessing Theater, 1906

The play opens one year after the suicide of Rosmer's wife, Beata. Rebecca had previously moved into the Rosmer family's manor, Rosmersholm, as a friend of Beata, and she lives there still. It becomes plain that she and Rosmer are in love, but he insists throughout the play that their relationship is completely platonic.

A highly respected member of his community, both by virtue of his position as a clergyman and his aristocratic family, Rosmer intends to support the newly elected government and its reformist, if not revolutionary, agenda. However, when he announces this to his friend and brother-in-law Kroll, the local schoolmaster, the latter becomes enraged at what he sees as his friend's betrayal of his ruling-class roots. Kroll begins to sabotage Rosmer's plans, confronting him about his relationship with Rebecca and denouncing the pair, initially in guarded terms, in the local newspaper.

Rosmer becomes consumed by his guilt, now believing he, rather than mental illness, caused his wife's suicide. He attempts to escape the guilt by erasing the memory of his wife and proposing marriage to Rebecca. But she rejects him outright. Kroll accuses her of using Rosmer as a tool to work her own political agenda. She admits that it was she who drove Mrs. Rosmer to deeper depths of despair and in a way even encouraged her suicide—initially to increase her power over Rosmer, but later because she actually fell in love with him. Because of her guilty past she cannot accept Rosmer's marriage proposal.

This leads to the ultimate breakdown in the play where neither Rosmer nor Rebecca can cast off moral guilt. She has acknowledged her part in the destruction of Beata. They can now no longer trust each other, or even themselves.

Rosmer then asks Rebecca to prove her devotion to him by committing suicide the same way his former wife did—by jumping into the mill-race. As Rebecca calmly seems to agree, issuing instructions about the recovery of her body from the water, Rosmer says he will join her. He is still in love with her and, since he cannot conceive of a way in which they can live together, they will die together. The play concludes with both characters jumping into the mill-race and the housekeeper, Mrs. Helseth, screaming in terror: "The dead woman has taken them."

=== Subsidiary characters ===
The actions of Brendel and Mortensgaard do not take the plot forward, although Mortensgaard reveals to Rosmer that Beata sent his newspaper a letter denying any rumors that her husband was unfaithful with Rebecca: the suggestion that his wife even considered such unfounded suspicion, which may have contributed to her decision to kill herself, upsets Rosmer greatly.

Brendel, returning for the first time in many years, calls at Rosmersholm before going on to preach political freedom and reform in the town, but his audience, somewhat drunk, beats him up and leaves him in the gutter. Returning to the house after the incident, he acknowledges that his ideals have not survived the encounter. He now recommends the approach of the pragmatic Mortensgaard, who demonstrates his own lack of ideals by urging Rosmer to support the reform movement while still professing to be Christian, though in reality Rosmer has lost his faith. Mortensgaard needs Rosmer's public support to show that there are prominent, respectable, pious citizens who agree with his policies.

== Imagery ==
The central image of the play is the White Horse of Rosmersholm, the "family ghost" in Rebecca's phrase. It is seen, or rumored to be seen, by the characters after the suicide of Beata. The horse symbolizes the past that revolves around Rosmer's dead wife, and haunts the survivors. The presence of the horse at their death represents their incapacity to "deal with" the memories that haunt them. The white horse is similar to the "ghosts" that Mrs. Alving refers to in Ibsen's 1881 tragedy Ghosts.

Ibsen selected the name of Rosmer for his protagonist in conscious echo of the Norwegian legend of Rosmer Havmand, a merman who lures a young woman to her death by drowning; it is the allure he holds for Rebecca that stirs up disaster. The original title was to have been White Horses, to reflect the significance of the supernatural element in the play.

== Background ==
Ibsen often used his childhood environment and relatives as models for people, environments, motives and events in his plays, and this also applied to Rosmersholm. Ibsen scholar Jon Nygaard writes that the loss of joy of life is an underlying theme of several of Ibsen's plays, including Rosmersholm, in which "the spirit of the dead and the aristocracy of officials [lingers heavily] over the manor [and] the Rosmerian view of life ennobles man – but it kills happiness". A key theme in Rosmersholm and other plays was, according to Nygaard, "the joy of life that was lost – and the new Puritan Civil Servant State that was coming. It was the spirit of civil servants from Upper Telemark, the Paus family," Ibsen's relatives on both his parents' sides. A major influence on Ibsen, particularly in the play Rosmersholm, was his collaboration with the early Realist poet Carl Snoilsky.

== Adaptations ==
=== Radio ===
A radio adaptation, translated by Frank McGuinness and directed by Peter Kavanagh, was broadcast on BBC Radio 3 on 15 January 2017.

=== Film ===
A television film directed by Terje Mærli was broadcast in 2001. Laila Goody starred as Rebecca West. Her performance was nominated for an Amanda Award for best actress. The film was nominated for an Amanda Award for best television drama.

== Reception and legacy ==
Rosmersholm has been described as one of Ibsen's most complex, subtle, multilayered and ambiguous plays; Rosmersholm and The Wild Duck are "often to be observed in the critics' estimates vying with each other as rivals for the top place among Ibsen's works."

In 1891, Rosmer of Rosmerholm, a prequel to Ibsen's play, written by Austin Fryers, was published. It premiered on April 19, 1892 at the Globe Theatre under the title, Beata. It was generally well received. Mrs. Patrick Campbell starred as the aforementioned character.

Matt Trueman argued that "Rosmersholm is hungry — no, ravenous — for change and yet, at the same time, incapable of it. Its characters are desperate to throw off the past to which they are inextricably shackled. It weighs them down even as they try to swim away: concrete shoes that just won’t come off". He concluded: "it is a 'Break Glass In Case of Emergencies' sort of a play. An alarum drama. Revive Rosmersholm for regime change."

British writer Cicely Isabel Fairfield took the pen name "Rebecca West" from the character in Rosmersholm.

The 2018 novel Lethal White by J. K. Rowling (under the pen name Robert Galbraith) opens each (otherwise untitled) chapter with a line from Rosmersholm.

In 2019, the play was revived at the Duke of York's Theatre in London in a new adaption by Duncan Macmillan under the direction of Ian Rickson, starring Tom Burke, Hayley Atwell and Giles Terera.

== Awards and nominations ==
=== 2019 West End revival ===
Year	Award	Category	Nominee	Result
2019	Evening Standard Theatre Award	Best Actress	Hayley Atwell	Nominated
2020	Laurence Olivier Award	Best Revival		Nominated
2020	Laurence Olivier Award	Best Actress	Hayley Atwell	Nominated
2020	Laurence Olivier Award	Best Set Design	Rae Smith	Nominated
2020	Laurence Olivier Award	Best Lighting Design	Neil Austin	Nominated
2020	Laurence Olivier Award	Best Sound Design	Gregory Clarke	Nominated

== See also ==
- Wrecked by success
- Rebecca West
