= Catiline (play) =

Work by Henrik Ibsen

Catiline or Catilina was Henrik Ibsen's first play. It was written during winter 1848–49 and first performed under Ibsen's name on 3 December 1881 at the Nya Teatern (New Theater), Stockholm, Sweden. The first performance of Catilina in Norway not under Ibsen's pseudonym (Brynjolf Bjarme) was at Det Nye Teater in Oslo on 24 August 1935.

== Background ==
Forced to support himself after his father's economic downfall during a national economic crisis, Ibsen went to Grimstad as a pharmacist's apprentice. There he both prepared himself for university and experimented with various forms of poetry. While studying, he found himself passionately drawn into the Catiline orations, famous speeches by Cicero against the elected questor Catiline and his conspiracy to overthrow the republic. Ibsen chose this conspirator as the subject for his initial effort, finishing Catiline in 1849. Ibsen expresses in the prologue to the second edition (1875) that he was profoundly inspired by the contemporary political situation of Europe, and that he favored the Magyar uprising against the Habsburg empire. He explains that the case of Catiline had special interest for him, because "there are given few examples of historical persons, whose memory has been more entirely in the possession of their conquerors, than Catiline". Thus, Catiline can be read as one of Ibsen's troubled (and troubling) heroes, alongside Brand and Gregers Werle.

== History and content ==
The play appeared in Christiania the following spring under Ibsen's early pseudonym, Brynjolf Bjarme.

The main character in this historical drama is the noble Roman Lucius Catilina, based on the historical figure of Catiline. He is torn between two women, his wife Aurelia and the Vestal virgin Furia. As characteristic of Ibsen's early work, the play is in blank verse.

Although Catiline may not be among Ibsen's best plays, it foreshadows many of the themes found in his later works. Catilina, full of doubts and torn between love and duty, is similar to protagonists in John Gabriel Borkman and The Master Builder.

Furia is also the prototype of some of the later female characters, such as Hedda Gabler.

Asked later what he had read when he wrote Catiline, Ibsen replied that he had read only the Danish Norse saga-inspired Romantic tragedian Adam Oehlenschläger and Ludvig Holberg, "the Scandinavian Molière". Halvdan Koht (in Efterladte Skrifter, Vol. I) claims that Ibsen relied on Friedrich Schiller's The Robbers (1781/82) and on Henrik Wergeland's tragedy Sinklars Død.
