= Ibsen quotes, Oslo =

Permanent work of art in Oslo, Norway

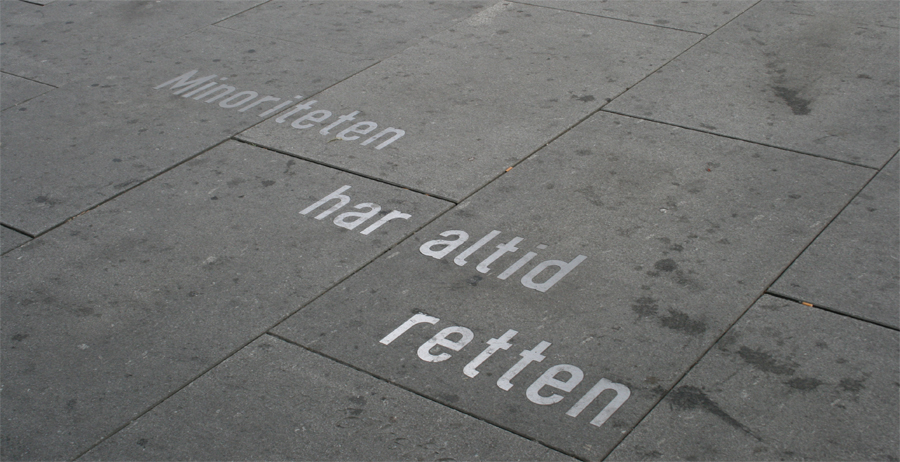
Example of a quote, from the play An Enemy of the People

The Ibsen quotes is a permanent work of art in Oslo, Norway, officially known as Ibsen Sitat. Famous quotes from Henrik Ibsen are incorporated into the sidewalks of prominent city streets.

== History ==
The initiative was taken by Sune Nordgren, inspired by a similar project involving August Strindberg quotes in Stockholm, Sweden. In 2001, Gavin Jantjes was appointed curator of the work. Sixty quotes in steel lettering were to be set into the sidewalks. The work was to be completed by 2006, the 100th anniversary of Henrik Ibsen's death. As a result of delays, by 2006 only three quotes had been laid, at a cost of 1.7 million kr. The Swedish artist duo FA+ (Ingrid Falk and Gustavo Aguerre) had been selected to handle the quotes, but they resigned from the project in May 2006. NOK 400,000 came from the Arts Council Norway and the foundation that oversaw the 100th anniversary, but some of the funds were used for other causes. The group behind the project, the Ibsen Foundation, explained that in their view the money had not been specifically earmarked.

In 2006, the Ibsen Foundation was relieved of involvement in the project. Between 2006 and 2008, the project advanced, resulting in a work of art consisting of 69 quotes and 4,011 letters. The quotes are strewn along a trail between the Ibsen Museum and Ibsen's favorite haunt, the Grand Café. Sparebankstiftelsen DnB NOR contributed a total of 8 million kr to the project.

== Criticism ==
The artwork has been criticized for displaying quotes by the famous author in a random and not always understandable way. Per Jæger, project leader since 2006, replied that it was among the most accessible works of art in Norway, and that ordinary people had been asked to pick some of the quotes. He said that it would become a "tourist attraction on a par with Fram and the Holmenkollen ski jump". The work has also been criticized as being unsuitable for city streets, creating additional requirements for cleaning and repair.

== Peculiarities ==
The text consistently displays typographical errors, such as using hyphens for rules, and underlinings for italics or emphatic spacing; and there are regular spelling mistakes, such as “Vilejløst” for “viljeløst”. The work’s title “Ibsen Sitat”, a separate composite, is ungrammatical.
