= Digte =

Poetry collection by Henrik Ibsen

Digte (English: "Poems") is a collection of poetry by Henrik Ibsen, published on 3 May 1871. It included poems written between 1847 and 1870, the best known being the poem "Terje Vigen".

An extended edition was published in December 1875, including four other poems.

== The poems ==
- "Spillemænd"
- "Kong Hakons gildehal"
- "Byggeplaner"
- "Markblomster og potteplanter"
- "En fuglevise"
- "På Akershus"
- "Ederfuglen"
- "Med en vandlilje"
- "Fugl og fuglefænger"
- "Bergmanden"
- "Min unge vin"
- "Lysræd"
- "Digterens vise"
- "Kløften"
- "Højfjeldsliv"
- "På sangertog"
- "En svane"
- "Priset være kvinden!"
- "4de Juli 1859"
- "Skolehuset"
- "Folkesorg"
- "Til thingmændene"
- "Hilsen til Svenskerne"
- "Til de genlevende"
- "Til professor Schweigård"
- "Vuggevise"
- "Borte!"
- "Stormsvalen"
- "Agnes"
- "Stambogsrim"
- "Mindets magt"
- "Åbent brev"
- "Til en bortdragende kunstner"
- "Ørnulfs drapa"
- "Fredrik den syvendes minde"
- "En broder i nød!"
- "Troens grund"
- "Storthings-gården"
- "Terje Vigen"
- "Forviklinger"
- "Fra mit husliv"
- "En kirke"
- "I galleriet"
- "De usynliges kor"
- "På vidderne"
- "Kvindernes bøn"
- "Tak"
- "Abraham Lincolns mord"
- "Til min ven revolutions-taleren"
- "Uden navn"
- "Ved Port Said"
- "Til Frederik Hegel"
- "Ballonbrev"
- "Rimbrev til fru Heiberg"
- "Ved et bryllup"
- "I en komponists stambog"
- "Brændte skibe"
- "Sanger-hilsen til Sverig"
- "Langt borte"
- "Et rimbrev"
- "Ved Tusendårs-festen den 18de Juli 1872"
- "Et vers"
- "Stjerner i lyståge"
- "De sad der, de to"
