= Ibsen Museum (Oslo) =

Literary museum is Oslo, Norway

Coordinates: 59.9152°N 10.727°E

The Ibsen Museum (Ibsenmuseet)
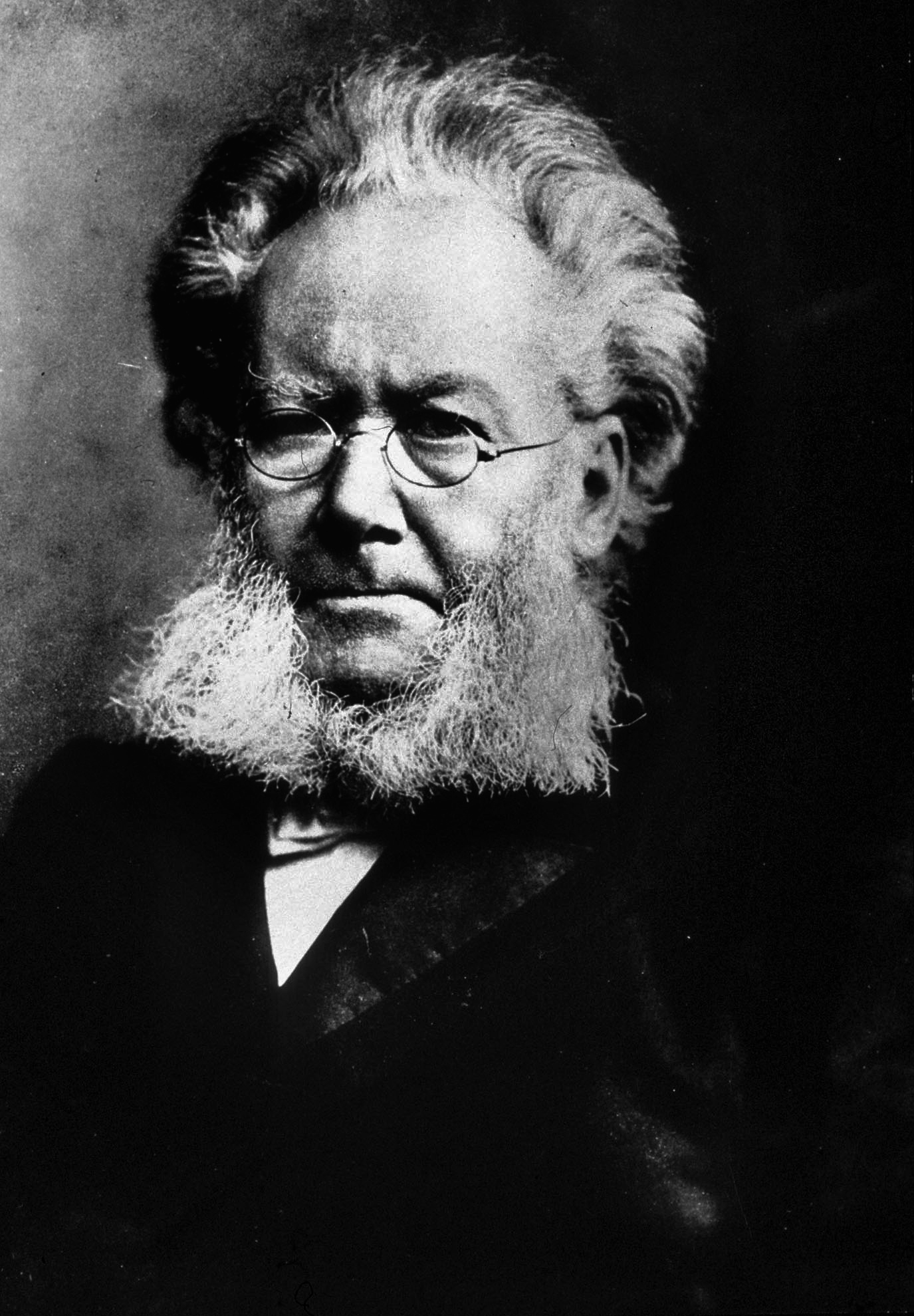
- Henrik Ibsen (1828-1906): photograph by Daniel Georg Nyblin
- Established: 1990, fully restored in 2006.
- Location: Henrik Ibsens gate 26, Oslo, Norway
- Visitors: 20,000/year
- Director: Erik Henning Edvardsen
- Website: Ibsenmuseet

The Ibsen Museum (Ibsenmuseet) occupies the last home of the playwright Henrik Ibsen. It is located close to the Royal Palace on Henrik Ibsens gate (street) in Oslo, Norway.

== Background ==
Henrik Ibsen and his wife Suzannah lived there from 1895 to 1906. When Suzannah Ibsen died in 1914, the home was dismantled and the furniture scattered. The municipality of Kristiania assumed possession of Henrik Ibsen's study and bedroom and deposited all of it at the Norwegian Folk Museum. The library went to the county museum in Skien (now Telemark museum) and the dining room to the Ibsen House Museum (now the City of Grimstad´s museum). The family retained possession of the remaining furniture.

In 1990 actor Knut Wigert took the initiative of renting the apartment, based on a wish to make it available to the public. As a point of departure for further restorations, studies were done documenting the most important rooms in the apartment. The Norwegian Folk Museum took over responsibility for operations in 1993, and Ibsen's study was restored but limited resources and a lack of original artifacts resulted in only this particular room being given an adequate presentation.

The Ibsen family made important contributions to the museum. Ambassador Tancred Ibsen lent or donated personal property inherited from his great-grandfather and his cousin, the actor Joen Bille, had for many years helped with the task of locating and reacquiring original furnishings. Financial assistance was provided by the Ministry of Culture and Church Affairs, Anders Jahres Humanitarian Institution and Ibsen Year 2006.

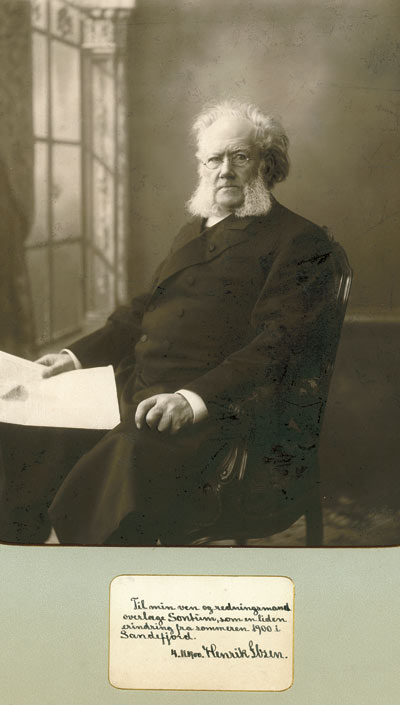
Henrik Ibsen. Photo by Gustav Borgen, Kristiania (Oslo) 1898.

== Restoration ==
Ibsen’s former residence has been restored to the period when it served as the Ibsen residence. On the occasion of the hundred-year commemoration of Ibsen's death, the Ibsen Museum reopened a completely restored writer's home with the original interior, original colors and decor. The Ibsen Museum includes an exhibit reflecting the playwright's life and work, housed the home where he spent the last 11 years of his life. It was here that Ibsen wrote his final dramatic works John Gabriel Borkman (1896) and When We Dead Awaken (1899).

Extensive groundwork was carried out to insure an authentic impression of the writer's home was created. The furniture was reinstated while the floor, walls, ceiling and surfaces were reconstructed according to archaeological building studies, supplemented by a range of historical sources. Tablecloths, curtains and drapes were rewoven as exact replicas of the originals. Additionally, in the street outside the Ibsen Museum in Oslo, there is artwork of Ibsen quotes permanently embedded in the pavement.

== Ibsen Museums in Norway ==
The three Ibsen Museums in Norway have a collaboration on practical measures of co-operation. The other two are the Henrik Ibsen Museum located in Skien at the farm Venstøp and the Ibsen Museum in Grimstad. .

== Gallery ==
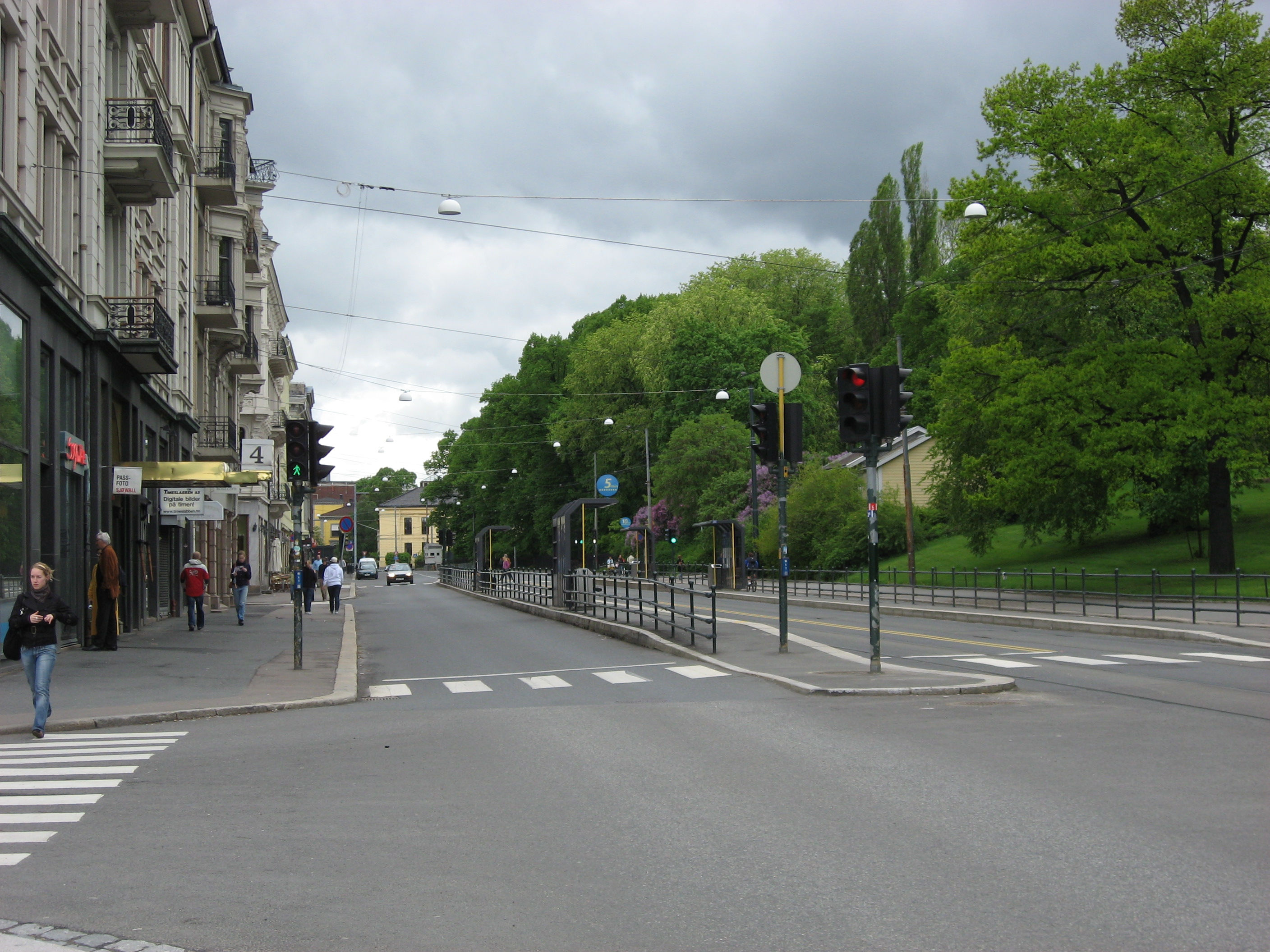
Henrik Ibsens gate seen towards Ibsen Museum on the left and Royal Palace on the right.

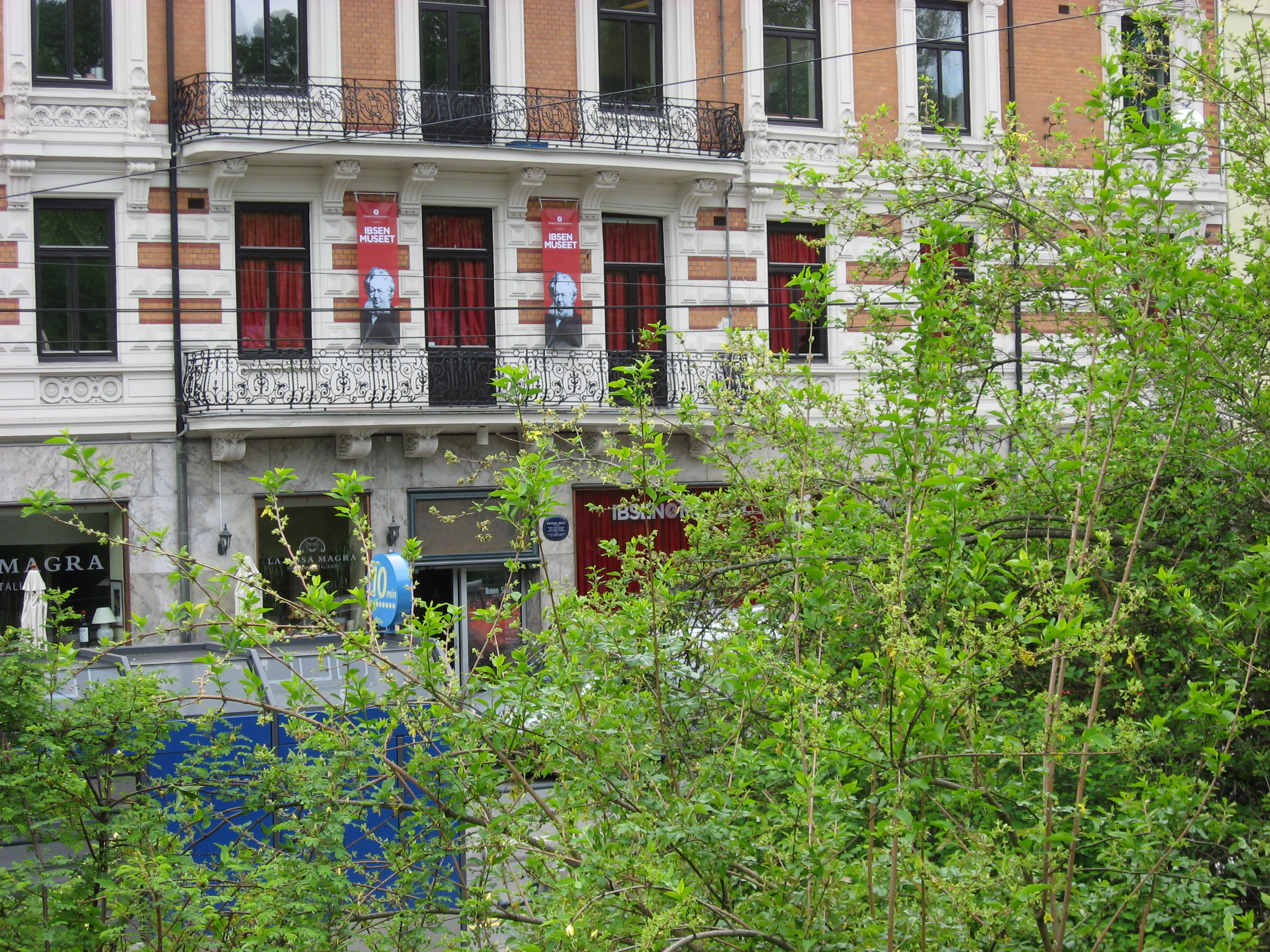
The Ibsen Museum at the corner of #1 Arbins gate and #24-26 Henrik Ibsens gate.

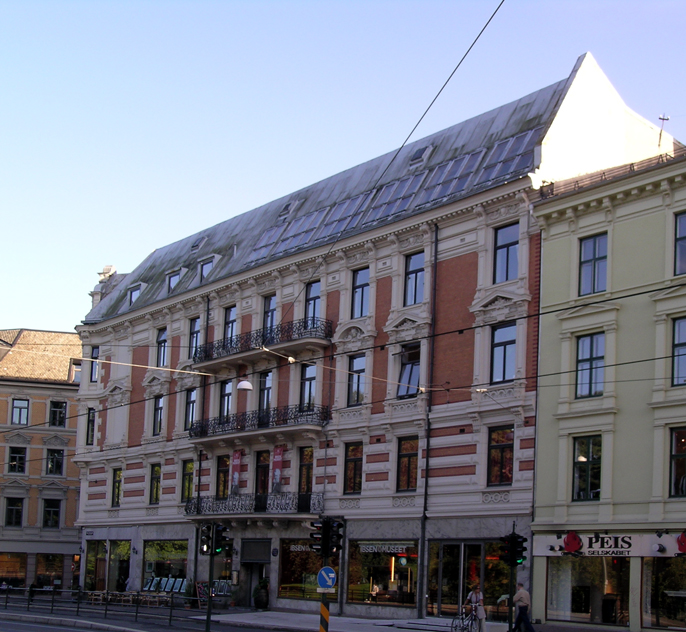
The entrance to The Ibsen Museum from #26 Henrik Ibsens gate.

== Other sources ==
- Dahl, Per Kristian Heggelund (2001) Streiflys Fem Ibsen-studier (Oslo: Ibsenmuseet) ISBN 82-91615-05-5
- Edvardsen, Erik Henning (1998) Ibsen-museet / The Ibsen Museum (Oslo: Ibsenmuseet) ISBN 82-91615-02-0
- Edvardsen, Erik Henning (2001) Henrik Ibsen om seg selv (Oslo Genesis forlag). ISBN 82-476-0211-3
- Edvardsen, Erik Henning (2003) Ibsens Christiania (Oslo: N.W. Damm & Søn) ISBN 82-496-0657-4
- Hjemdahl, Anne-Sofie (2006) A Thing or Two About Ibsen. His Possessions, Dramatic Poetry and Life (Oslo: Andrimne forlag) ISBN 82-92546-07-3

== Related Reading ==
- Museumsbuletinen No. 1 - 2006. Norsk Folkemuseums venner, Oslo
- Ibsens Bathtub. The restoration of Henrik Ibsen's apartment by Erling Borgen. Borgen Production as / Norsk Folkemuseum
