= Henrik Ibsen =

Norwegian playwright (1828–1906)

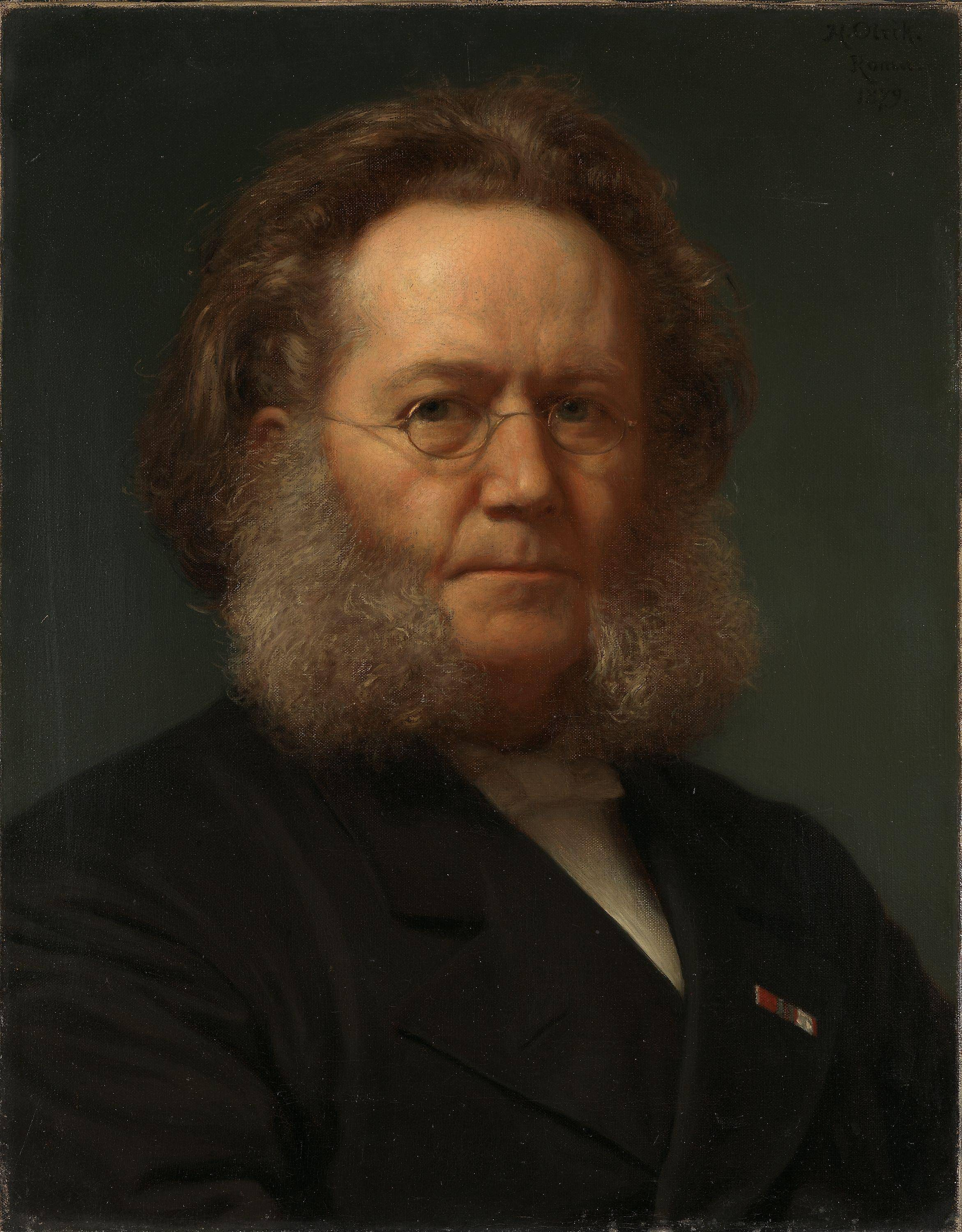
- Born: Henrik Johan Ibsen; 20 March 1828; Skien, Telemark, Norway
- Died: 23 May 1906 (aged 78); Kristiania, Norway
- Education: Heltberg School
- Spouse: Suzannah Thoresen (m. 1858)
- Children: Sigurd Ibsen
- Parent(s): Knud Ibsen (father); Marichen Altenburg (mother)
- Writing career
- Genres: Drama
- Notable works: Brand (1865); Peer Gynt (1867); A Doll's House (1879); Ghosts (1881); An Enemy of the People (1882); The Wild Duck (1884); Rosmersholm (1886); Hedda Gabler (1890)
- Movements: Naturalism, realism

Henrik Johan Ibsen (/ˈɪbsən/; Norwegian: [ˈhɛ̀nrɪk ˈɪ̀psn̩]; 20 March 1828 – 23 May 1906) was a Norwegian playwright. He is considered one of the world's pre-eminent writers of the 19th century and is often referred to as "the father of modern drama". He pioneered theatrical realism but also wrote lyrical epic works. His major works include Brand, Peer Gynt, Emperor and Galilean, A Doll's House, Ghosts, An Enemy of the People, The Wild Duck, Rosmersholm, Hedda Gabler, The Master Builder, and When We Dead Awaken. In 2014, Ibsen was considered the most frequently performed dramatist in the world after Shakespeare. Store norske leksikon describes him as "the center of the Norwegian literary canon".

Ibsen was born into the merchant elite of the port town of Skien and had strong family ties to the Paus family and other families who had held power and wealth in Telemark since the mid-1500s. He established himself as a theater director in Norway during the 1850s and gained international recognition as a playwright with the plays Brand and Peer Gynt in the 1860s. From 1864, he lived for 27 years in Italy and Germany, primarily in Rome, Dresden, and Munich, making only brief visits to Norway, before moving to Christiania (Oslo) in 1891. Most of Ibsen's plays are set in Norway, often in bourgeois environments and places reminiscent of Skien, and he frequently drew inspiration from family members. Ibsen's early verse play Peer Gynt has strong surreal elements. After Peer Gynt Ibsen abandoned verse and wrote in realistic prose. Several of his later dramas were considered scandalous to many of his era, when European theatre was expected to model strict morals of family life and propriety. Ibsen's later work examined the realities that lay behind the façades, revealing much that was disquieting to a number of his contemporaries. He had a critical eye and conducted a free inquiry into the conditions of life and issues of morality. Critics frequently rate The Wild Duck and Rosmersholm as Ibsen's best works; the playwright himself regarded Emperor and Galilean as his masterpiece.

Ibsen is considered one of the most important playwrights in the history of world literature and is widely regarded as the foremost playwright of the nineteenth century. Sigmund Freud considered him on par with Shakespeare and Sophocles, while George Bernard Shaw argued that Ibsen had surpassed Shakespeare as the world's pre-eminent dramatist. Ibsen influenced other playwrights and novelists such as George Bernard Shaw, Oscar Wilde, and James Joyce. Considered a profound poetic dramatist, he is widely regarded as the most important playwright since Shakespeare. Ibsen is commonly described as the most famous Norwegian internationally. Ibsen wrote his plays in Dano-Norwegian, (Note: At the time, Norway shared its main written language—now often referred to as Dano-Norwegian—with Denmark, and this written language was referred to by contemporaries as Danish in Denmark and as Norwegian in Norway. During Ibsen's lifetime, Dano-Norwegian underwent spelling reforms in both Denmark and Norway, but the modernization of the language occurred largely in parallel throughout his life. There were nevertheless minor differences between the form used in Denmark and the form used in Norway, including some vocabulary and expressions more characteristic of Norway. Only in 1907 did Norwegian start to diverge from Danish to the degree that it became considered a separate, but still very similar written language. Compare Haugen, Einar (1979). "The Nuances of Norwegian". Ibsen's Drama: Author to Audience. Minneapolis: University of Minnesota. p. 99. ISBN 978-0-8166-0896-6.) and they were published by the Danish publisher Gyldendal. He was the father of Prime Minister Sigurd Ibsen and a relative of the singer Ole Paus.

== Early life and background ==
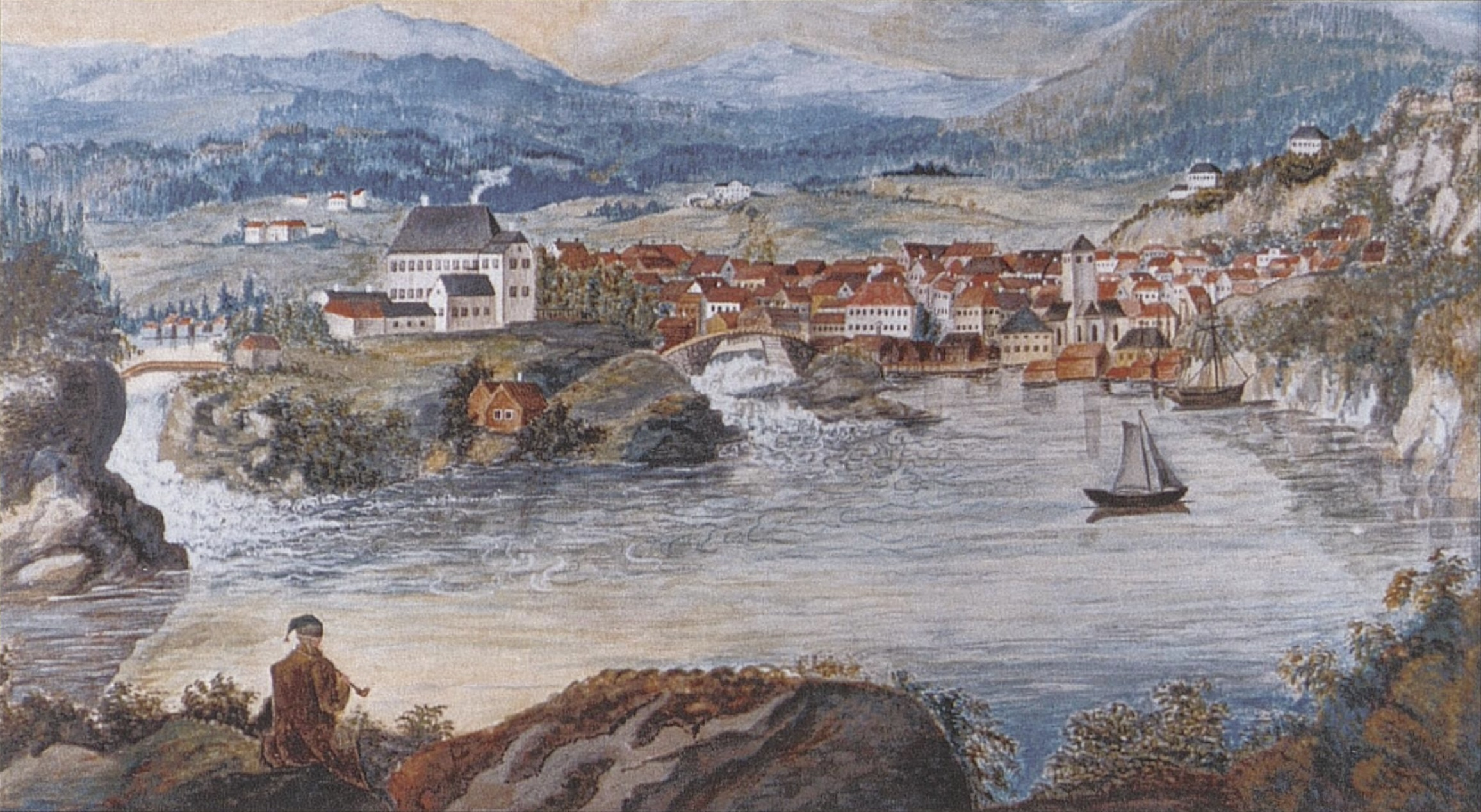
Skien in 1822

Henrik Johan Ibsen was born on 20 March 1828 into an affluent merchant family in the prosperous port town of Skien in the county of Bratsberg (Telemark). He was the son of the merchant Knud Plesner Ibsen and Marichen Cornelia Martine Altenburg, and he grew up as a member of the extended Paus family, which consisted of the siblings Ole and Hedevig Paus and their tightly knit families. Ibsen's ancestors were primarily merchants and shipowners in cities such as Skien and Bergen, or members of the "aristocracy of officials" of Upper Telemark, the region's civil servant elite. Jørgen Haave writes that Ibsen "had strong family ties to the families who had held power and wealth in Telemark since the mid-1500s". Henrik Ibsen himself wrote that "my parents were members on both sides of the most respected families in Skien", and that he was closely related to "just about all the patrician families who then dominated the place and its surroundings". He was baptised at home in the Lutheran state church—membership of which was mandatory—on 28 March and the baptism was confirmed in Christian's Church on 19 June. When Ibsen was born, Skien had for centuries been one of Norway's most important and internationally oriented cities, and a centre of seafaring, timber exports and early industrialization that had made Norway the developed and prosperous part of Denmark–Norway.

=== The Paus family of Rising and Altenburg House ===
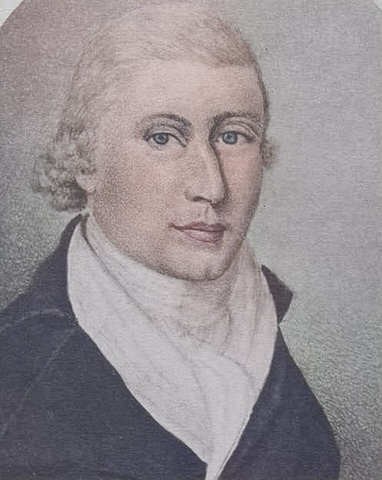
Ole Paus (1766–1855), Ibsen's step-grandfather; an ancestor of the singer

Ibsen's parents, Knud and Marichen, grew up as close relatives, sometimes referred to as "near-siblings", and both belonged to the tightly intertwined Paus family of Rising and Altenburg House – that is, the extended family of the sibling pair Ole Paus (1766–1855) and Hedevig Paus (1763–1848).

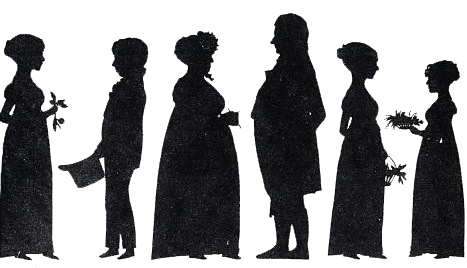
A silhouette (ca. 1820) of the Altenburg/Paus family in Altenburggården, with Ibsen's mother (far right), maternal grandparents (centre) and other relatives. It is the only existing portrait of either of Ibsen's parents.

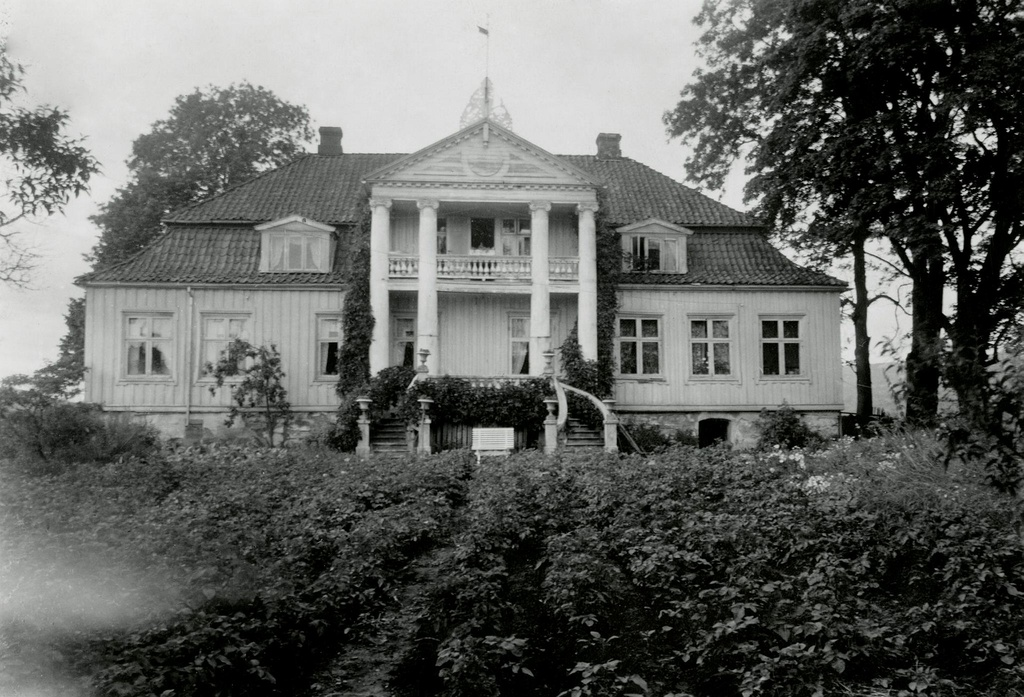
Rising, Norway, Knud Ibsen's childhood home. The farm was bought by his stepfather Ole Paus in 1799, on the same day he sold the Ibsen house in Løvestrædet, which he had inherited from his wife Johanne's first husband Henrich Ibsen. Rising was the home of Henrik Ibsen's grandparents during his childhood and, along with Venstøp, stands as one of the two most significant preserved landmarks of his childhood environment.

After Knud's father Henrich Johan Ibsen died at sea when Knud was a newborn, his mother Johanne Plesner married captain Ole Paus the following year. Like Henrich Johan Ibsen before him, Paus thus became the brother-in-law of Skien's wealthiest man, Diderik von Cappelen. In 1799, Ole Paus sold the Ibsen House in Skien's Løvestrædet (Lion's Street), which he had inherited from his wife's first husband, and bought the estate Rising outside Skien from a sister of his brother-in-law von Cappelen. Knud grew up at Rising with most of his many half-siblings, among them the later governor Christian Cornelius Paus and the shipowner Christopher Blom Paus. In the 1801 census the Paus family of Rising had seven servants.

Marichen grew up in the stately Altenburg House in the center of Skien with her parents Hedevig Paus and Johan Andreas Altenburg. Altenburg was a shipowner, timber merchant, and owned a large liquor distillery at Lundetangen and a farm outside of town, and after his death, Hedevig took over the business in 1824.

The siblings Ole and Hedevig Paus were born in Lårdal in Upper Telemark, where the Paus family belonged to the region's elite, the "aristocracy of officials", (Note: The Paus family holds a somewhat unique place in Norwegian history for their long-standing and evolving elite status under shifting state regimes. Their earliest known ancestor, Hans Olufsson (died 1570), was a canon at St. Mary's Church in Oslo, the royal chapel and seat of government. He held the personal rank of knight, the highest noble rank in Norway at the time, typically reserved for statesmen of national significance. The rank was not hereditary. As Norway never developed a broad or enduring hereditary noble class—due in part to a centralized, meritocratic state ideology—a small number of elite families came to occupy roles that functionally resembled the regional nobility found elsewhere in Europe. The Paus family became one of the most prominent examples. From the 17th century onward, they were central to what historians have called the "aristocracy of officials" in Upper Telemark. Historian Øystein Rian described it as "a nobility-resembling elite"—a class of priests and lawyers who wielded significant autonomy and preserved their hold on influential positions across generations. The Paus family, for example, held the district judgeship for 106 years over five generations (1668–1774). Under the traditional estate system, the clergy also constituted one of the two legally privileged estates of the realm, alongside the nobility; until the 19th century, the style herr (Sir) was reserved for clergy and nobility. By the late 19th century, the family began to assert a more explicit aristocratic identity. Members living in Italy and Austria adopted styles like de Paus and von Paus, and in 1923, Christopher Paus was ennobled as a count by Pope Pius XI. This symbolic use of aristocratic forms abroad was not merely pragmatic, but a conscious assertion of nobilitas—that is, of elite cultural identity—in the broader European sense. Henrik Ibsen, a descendant of the Paus family, drew heavily on this background in his plays. Ibsen scholar Jon Nygaard has described "the new puritanical civil servant state, with the ethos of Upper Telemark and the Paus family", as a central theme in Ibsen's work.) and had moved to Skien at a young age with their oldest sister, joining Skien's merchant elite with the support of their relatives in the family Blom. The children from Ole's and Hedevig's homes maintained close contact throughout Knud's and Marichen's childhood; notably, Ole's oldest son, Knud's half-brother Henrik Johan Paus, was raised in Hedevig's home. The Paus family reflects a meritocratic elite defined by education, priesthood, and public office.

=== Knud Ibsen's marriage to Marichen Altenburg ===
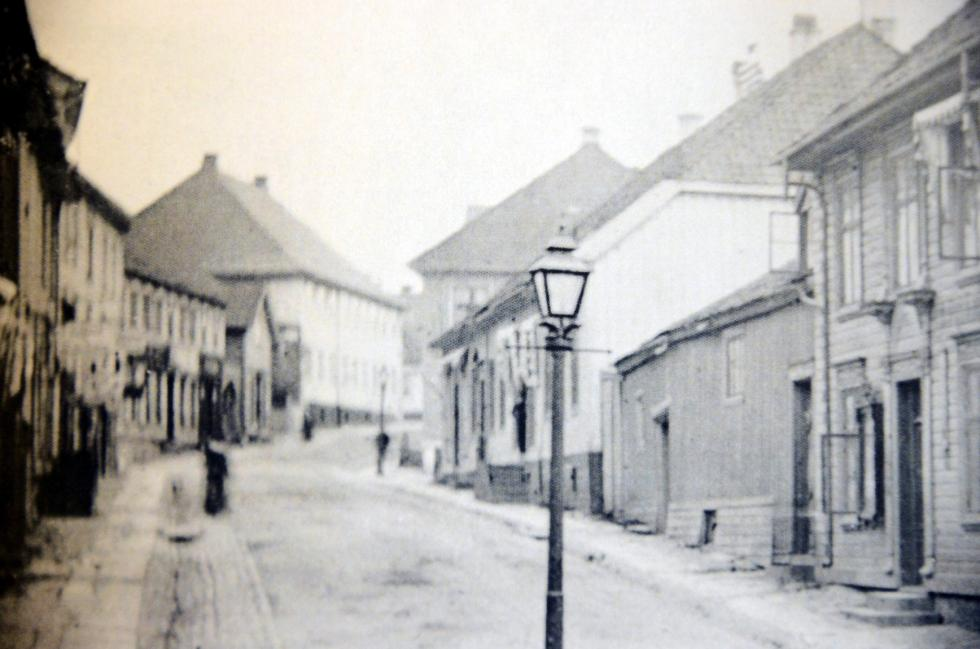
The roof and one of the windows of Altenburggården can be seen in the middle of the picture. Altenburggården was Marichen Altenburg's childhood home, and Henrik Ibsen lived there aged 3–8.

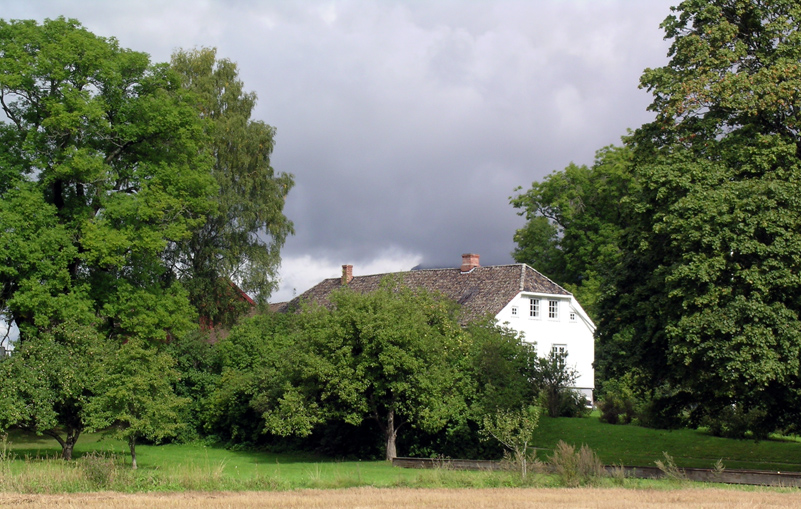
Venstøp outside Skien, originally the Ibsen family's summer house, where they lived permanently 1836–1843. It was a reasonably large farm with large, representative buildings.

In 1825, Henrik's father Knud acquired the burghership of Skien and established an independent business as a timber and luxury goods merchant there, with his younger brother, Christopher Blom Paus, then aged 15, as his apprentice. The two brothers moved into the Stockmanngården building, where they rented a part of the building and lived with a maid. On the first floor the brothers sold foreign wines and a variety of luxury items, while also engaging in wholesale export of timber in cooperation with their first cousin Diderik von Cappelen. On 1 December 1825, Knud married his stepfather's niece Marichen, who then moved in with them. Henrik was born there in 1828. In 1830, Marichen's mother Hedevig left Altenburggården and her properties and business ventures to her son-in-law Knud, and the Ibsen family moved to Marichen's childhood home in 1831. During the 1820s and 1830s, Knud was a wealthy young merchant in Skien, and he was the city's 16th largest taxpayer in 1833.

Older Ibsen scholars have claimed that Henrik Ibsen was fascinated by his parents' "strange, almost incestuous marriage", and he would treat the subject of incestuous relationships in several plays, notably in his masterpiece Rosmersholm. On the other hand, Jørgen Haave points out that his parents' close relationship was not that unusual among the Skien elite.

=== Childhood ===
In his unfinished biography From Skien to Rome, Henrik Ibsen wrote about the Skien of his childhood:

In my childhood, Skien was an extremely joyful and festive town, quite the opposite of what it would later become. Many highly cultured, prosperous families at that time lived partly in the city itself, partly on large farms in the area. Close or more remote kinship connected most of these families amongst themselves, and balls, dinner parties, and musical soirées came one after another in rapid succession both during winters and summers. [...] Visits from strangers were almost a constant occurrence at our spacious farmhouse and especially around Christmastime and the market days, our townhouse was full and the table was set from morning to nightfall.

— Henrik Ibsen

Haave writes that the sources who knew Henrik in childhood described him as "a boy who was pampered by his father, who enjoyed being creative in solitude, and who provoked peers with his superiority and arrogance". Henrik engaged in model theater, which was particularly popular among boys from bourgeois homes in Europe in the early 1800s. In contrast to his father, who was described as sociable and playful with a cheerful and friendly demeanor, Henrik was depicted as a more introverted personality. This trait was said to be shared with several relatives in the Paus family, and later with his own son, Sigurd. Johan Kielland Bergwitz claimed that "it is with the Paus family that Henrik Ibsen has the most pronounced temperament traits in common". Referring to the Paus side of the family, Hedvig Ibsen remarked, "we belong to a silent family", playfully echoing the similarity between "taus" (silent) and "Paus". One of the Cudrio sisters from the neighboring farm, who knew Henrik Ibsen in childhood, said, "he was immensely cunning and malicious, and he even beat us. But when he grew up, he became incredibly handsome, yet no one liked him because he was so malicious. No one wanted to be with him."

When Henrik Ibsen was around seven years old, his father's fortunes took a turn for the worse, and in 1835 the family was forced to sell Altenburggården. The following year they moved to their stately summer home and farm, Venstøp, outside of the city. They were still relatively affluent, had four servants, and socialised with other members of the Skien elite, e.g. through lavish parties; their closest neighbours on Southern Venstøp were former shipowner and mayor of Skien Ulrich Frederik Cudrio and his family, who also had been forced to sell their townhouse. In 1843, after Henrik left home, the Ibsen family moved to a townhouse at Snipetorp, owned by Knud Ibsen's half-brother and former apprentice Christopher Blom Paus, who had established himself as an independent merchant in Skien in 1836 and who eventually became one of the city's leading shipowners. Knud continued to struggle to maintain his business and had some success in the 1840s, but in the 1850s his business ventures and professional activities came to an end, and he became reliant on support from his successful younger half-brothers.

=== Romanticization and reassessment ===
Historically, Ibsen's background was romanticized or dramatized to align with the narrative of the self-made genius. Early biographical accounts, like Henrik Jæger's seminal biography, often emphasized a narrative of adversity: a descent from privilege into hardship, culminating in Ibsen's artistic triumph. This interpretation positioned Ibsen's works as expressions of personal struggle against societal and familial constraints, resonating with his broader critique of bourgeois morality. The depiction of Ibsen's father as a failed merchant and tyrannical figure who fell into alcoholism, combined with the narrative of the family's social decline, provided a lens through which many early scholars interpreted themes in Ibsen's plays, such as financial ruin, family dysfunction, and hidden moral conflicts.

Modern scholarship frames Henrik Ibsen not as a self-made artist rising from hardship, but as a product of Norway's patrician elite whose critique of society reflected his privileged yet transitional upbringing. Ibsen scholar Ellen Rees notes that historical and biographical research into Ibsen's life in the 21st century has been marked by a "revolution" that has debunked numerous tales previously taken for granted. Older Ibsen historiography has often claimed that Knud Ibsen experienced financial ruin and became an alcoholic tyrant, that the family lost contact with the elite it had belonged to, and that this had a strong influence on Henrik Ibsen's biography and work. Newer Ibsen scholarship—in particular Jon Nygaard's book on Ibsen's wider social milieu and ancestry and Jørgen Haave's book The Ibsen Family (Familien Ibsen)—has refuted such claims, and Haave has pointed out that older biographical works have uncritically repeated numerous unfounded tales about both of Ibsen's parents, and about the playwright's childhood and background in general.

Haave points out that Knud Ibsen's economic problems in the 1830s were mainly the result of the difficult times and something the Ibsen family had in common with most members of the bourgeoisie; Haave further argues that Henrik Ibsen had a happy and comfortable childhood as a member of the upper class, even after the family moved to Venstøp, and that they were able to maintain their lifestyle and patrician identity with the help of their extended family and accumulated cultural capital. Contrary to the incorrect claims that Ibsen had been born in a small or remote town, Haave points out that Skien had been Eastern Norway's leading commercial city for centuries, and a centre of seafaring, timber exports, and early industrialization that had made Norway the developed and prosperous part of Denmark–Norway.

Rees characterizes Ibsen's family as upper class rather than middle class, and part of "the closest thing Norway had to an aristocracy, albeit one that lost most of its power during his lifetime". Ibsen scholar Jon Nygaard stated that Ibsen had an "exceptional upper-class background" and was a result of Norway being a wealthy country for a very long time. Haave points out that virtually all of Ibsen's ancestors had been wealthy burghers and higher government officials, and members of the local and regional elites in the areas they lived, often of continental European ancestry. He argues that "the Ibsen family belonged to an elite that distanced itself strongly from the common farmer population, and considered itself part of an educated European culture" and that "it was this patrician class that formed his cultural identity and upbringing". Haave points to many examples of both Henrik Ibsen and other members of his family having a condescending attitude towards common Norwegian farmers, viewing them as "some sort of primitive indigenous population", and being very conscious of their own identity as members of the sophisticated upper class. Haave points out that Ibsen's most immediate family—Knud, Marichen and Henrik's siblings—disintegrated financially and socially in the 1850s, but that it happened after Henrik had left home, at a time when he was establishing himself as a successful man of theatre, while his extended family, such as his uncles Henrik Johan Paus, Christian Cornelius Paus and Christopher Blom Paus, were firmly established in Skien's elite as lawyers, government officials and wealthy shipowners. Haave argues that the story of the Ibsen family is the story of the slow collapse of a patrician merchant family amid the emergence of a new democratic society in the 19th century, and that Henrik Ibsen, like others of his class, had to find new opportunities to maintain his social position. Nygaard summarized the revolution in the understanding of Ibsen's childhood and background as all the popular notions about Ibsen being wrong.

=== Literary influence of his childhood ===
Many Ibsen scholars have compared characters and themes in his plays to his family and upbringing; his themes often deal with issues of financial difficulty as well as moral conflicts stemming from dark secrets hidden from society. Ibsen himself confirmed that he both modeled and named characters in his plays after his own family. Works such as Peer Gynt, The Wild Duck, Rosmersholm, Hedda Gabler, An Enemy of the People, and Ghosts include numerous references to Ibsen's relatives, family history, and childhood memories. However, despite Ibsen's use of his family as an inspiration for his plays, Haave criticizes the uncritical use of Ibsen's dramas as biographical sources and the "naive" readings of them as literal representations of his family members, in particular his father.

== Career ==
=== 1846–1859: Grimstad years ===
At fifteen, Ibsen left school. He moved to the small town of Grimstad to become an apprentice pharmacist. At that time he began writing plays. In 1846, when Ibsen was 18, he had a liaison with Else Sophie Jensdatter Birkedalen which produced a son, Hans Jacob Hendrichsen Birkdalen, whose upbringing Ibsen paid for until the boy was fourteen, though Ibsen never saw the child. Ibsen went to Christiania (later spelled Kristiania and then renamed Oslo) intending to matriculate at the university. He soon rejected the idea (his earlier attempts at entering university were blocked as he did not pass all his entrance exams), preferring to commit himself to writing. His first play, the tragedy Catilina (1850), was published under the pseudonym "Brynjolf Bjarme", when he was only 22, but it was not performed. His first play to be staged, The Burial Mound (1850), received little attention. Still, Ibsen was determined to be a playwright, although the numerous plays he wrote in the following years remained unsuccessful. Ibsen's main inspiration in the early period, right up to Peer Gynt, was apparently the Norwegian author Henrik Wergeland and the Norwegian folk tales as collected by Peter Christen Asbjørnsen and Jørgen Moe. In Ibsen's youth, Wergeland was the most acclaimed, and by far the most read, Norwegian poet and playwright.

Ibsen spent the next several years employed at Det norske Theater (Bergen), where he was involved in the production of more than 145 plays as a writer, director, and producer. During this period, he published five new—though largely unremarkable—plays. Despite Ibsen's failure to achieve success as a playwright, he gained a great deal of practical experience at the Norwegian Theater, experience that was to prove valuable when he continued writing. Ibsen returned to Christiania in 1858 to become the creative director of the Christiania Theatre. He married Suzannah Thoresen on 18 June 1858 and she gave birth to their only child Sigurd on 23 December 1859. The couple lived in difficult financial circumstances and Ibsen became very disenchanted with life in Norway.

=== 1864–1883: Established work and acclaim ===
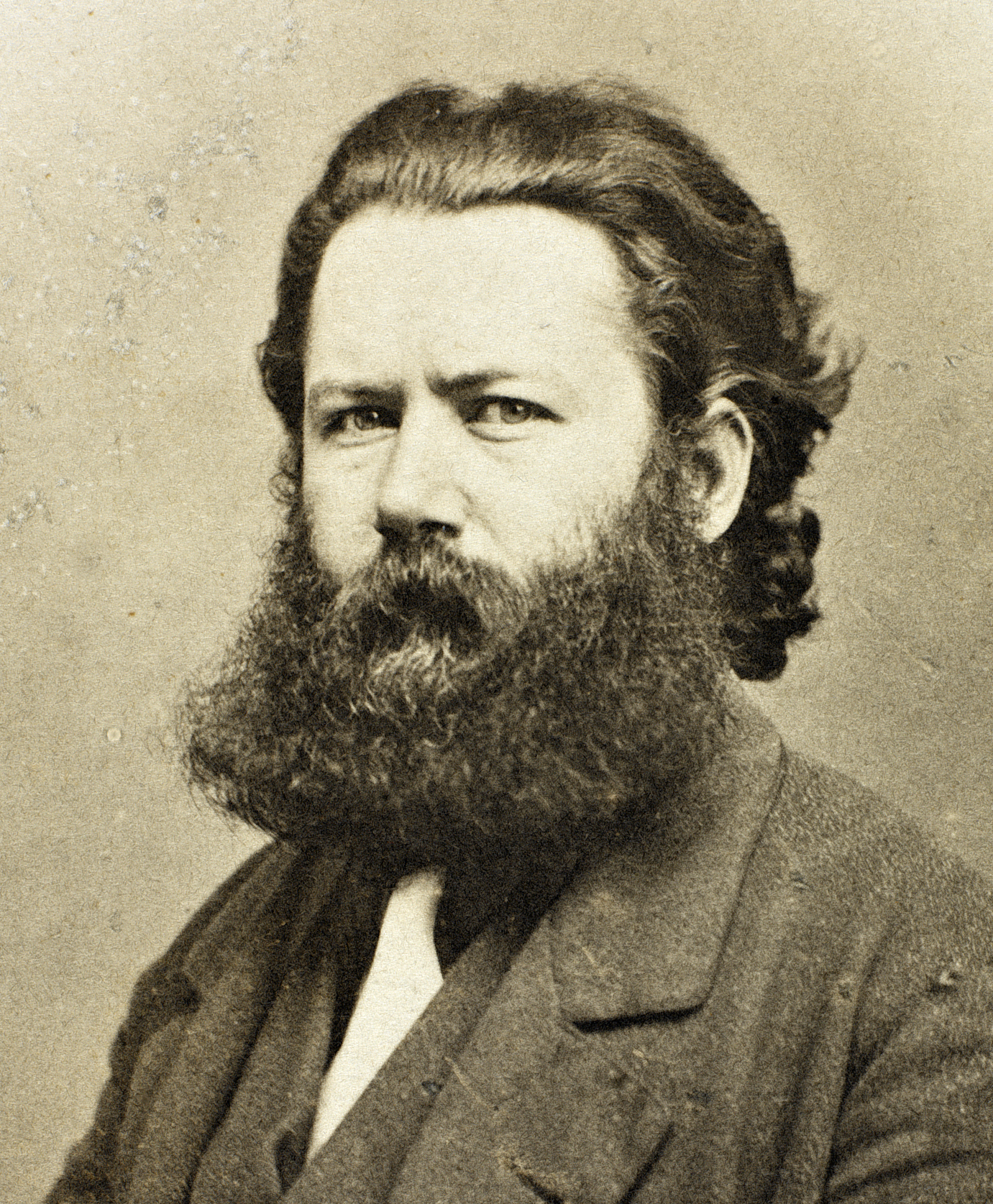
One of the oldest photographs of Ibsen from ca. 1863/64, around the time he began writing Brand

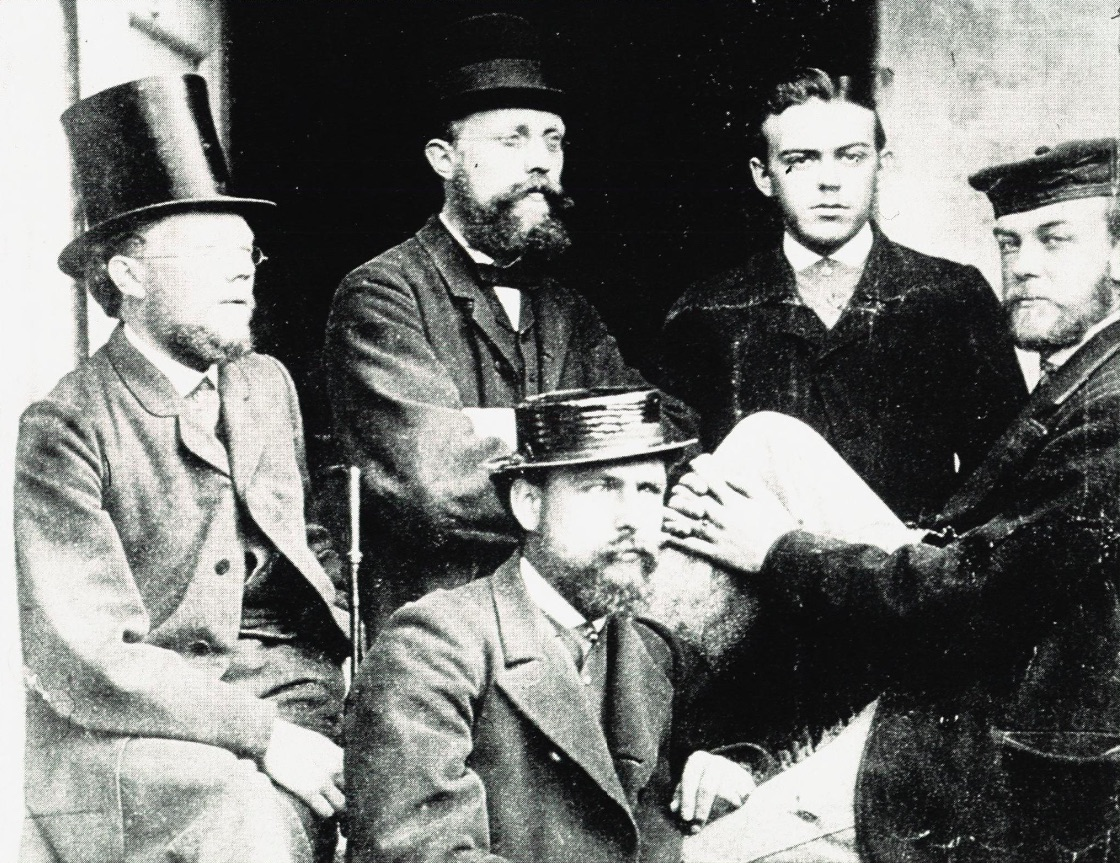
Ibsen (far left) with friends in Rome, ca. 1867

In 1864, he left Christiania and went to Sorrento in Italy in self-imposed exile. He spent the next 27 years in Italy and Germany and only visited Norway a few times during those years. His next play, Brand (1865), brought him the critical acclaim he sought, along with a measure of financial success, as did the following play, Peer Gynt (1867), to which Edvard Grieg composed incidental music and songs. Although Ibsen read excerpts of the Danish philosopher Søren Kierkegaard and traces of the latter's influence are evident in Brand, it was not until after Brand that Ibsen came to take Kierkegaard seriously. Initially annoyed with his friend Georg Brandes for comparing Brand to Kierkegaard, Ibsen nevertheless read Either/Or and Fear and Trembling. Ibsen's next play Peer Gynt was consciously informed by Kierkegaard. With success, Ibsen became more confident and began to introduce more and more of his own beliefs and judgements into the drama, exploring what he termed the "drama of ideas". His next series of plays are often considered his Golden Age, when he entered the height of his power and influence, becoming the center of dramatic controversy across Europe.

Ibsen moved from Italy to Dresden, Germany, in 1868, where he spent years writing the play he regarded as his main work, Emperor and Galilean (1873), dramatizing the life and times of the Roman emperor Julian the Apostate. Although Ibsen himself always looked back on this play as the cornerstone of his entire works, very few shared his opinion, and his next works would be much more acclaimed. Ibsen moved to Munich in 1875 and began work on his first contemporary realist drama The Pillars of Society, first published and performed in 1877. A Doll's House followed in 1879. This play is a scathing criticism of the marital roles accepted by men and women which characterized Ibsen's society. Ibsen was already in his fifties when A Doll's House was published. He himself saw his latter plays as a series. At the end of his career, he described them as "that series of dramas which began with A Doll's House and which is now completed with When We Dead Awaken". Furthermore, it was the reception of A Doll's House which brought Ibsen international acclaim.

Ghosts followed in 1881, another scathing commentary on the morality of Ibsen's society, in which a widow reveals to her pastor that she had hidden the evils of her marriage for its duration. The pastor had advised her to marry her fiancé despite his philandering, and she did so in the belief that her love would reform him. But his philandering continued right up until his death, and his vices are passed on to their son in the form of syphilis. The mention of venereal disease alone was scandalous, but to show how it could poison a respectable family was considered intolerable.

In An Enemy of the People (1882), Ibsen went even further. In earlier plays, controversial elements were important and even pivotal components of the action, but they were on the small scale of individual households. In An Enemy, controversy became the primary focus, and the antagonist was the entire community. One primary message of the play is that the individual, who stands alone, is more often "right" than the mass of people, who are portrayed as ignorant and sheeplike. Contemporary society's belief was that the community was a noble institution that could be trusted, a notion Ibsen challenged. In An Enemy of the People, Ibsen chastised not only the conservatism of society, but also the liberalism of the time. He illustrated how people on both sides of the social spectrum could be equally self-serving. It was once believed that An Enemy of the People was written as a response to the people who had rejected his previous work, Ghosts, however this has been debunked by scholars. Documented in a letter written to his publisher Frederik Hegel when Ghosts had been sent off for printing, Ibsen wrote: "I am already playing with the idea of a new four-act comedy, which I thought of earlier but put aside in favour of 'Ghosts', as this was urging me on and absorbing all my interest." The protagonist of the play is a physician in a vacation spot whose primary draw is a public bath. The doctor discovers that the water is contaminated by the local tannery. He expects to be acclaimed for saving the town from the nightmare of infecting visitors with disease, but instead he is declared an 'enemy of the people' by the locals, who band against him and even throw stones through his windows. The play ends with his complete ostracism. It is obvious to the reader that disaster is in store for the town as well as for the doctor.

As audiences by now expected, Ibsen's next play again attacked entrenched beliefs and assumptions; but this time, his attack was not against society's mores, but against overeager reformers and their idealism. Always an iconoclast, Ibsen saw himself as an objective observer of society, "like a lone franc tireur in the outposts", playing a lone hand, as he put it. Ibsen, perhaps more than any of his contemporaries, relied upon immediate sources such as newspapers and second-hand report for his contact with intellectual thought. He claimed to be ignorant of books, leaving them to his wife and son, but, as Georg Brandes described, "he seemed to stand in some mysterious correspondence with the fermenting, germinating ideas of the day".

=== 1884–1896: Later work ===
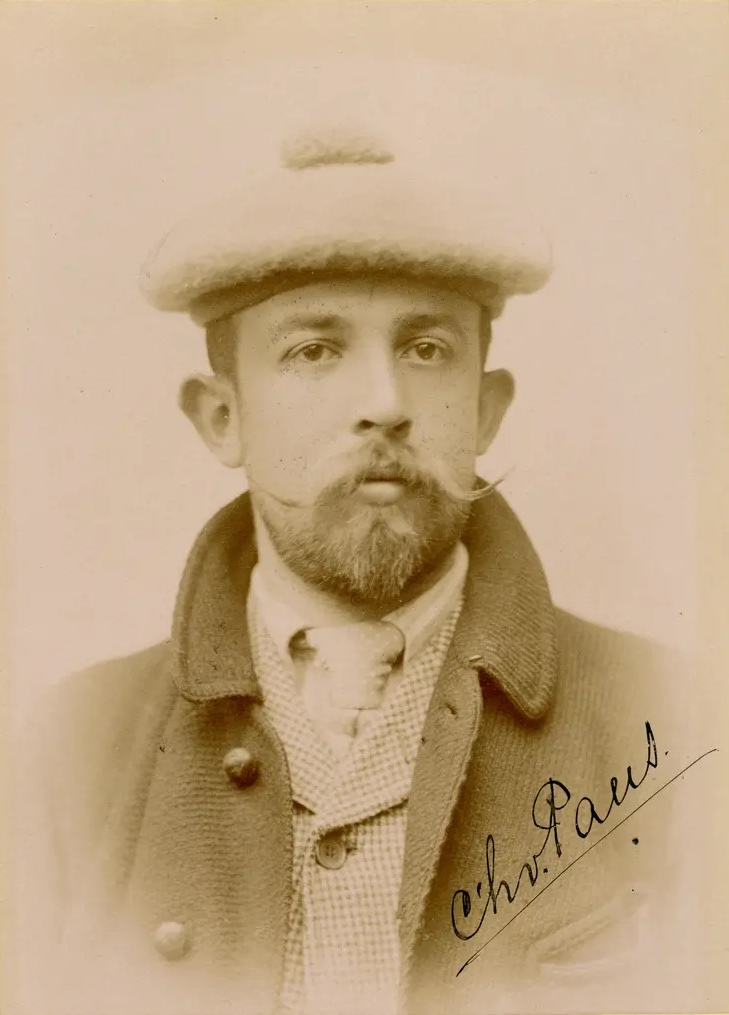
Count Christopher Paus paid an extended visit to Ibsen in Rome in 1884, when Ibsen was working on The Wild Duck, an intimate play that draws inspiration from his own family. It was the only meeting between Ibsen and his family from Skien during Ibsen's years in exile. Ibsen had not been this close to his own family since he left his hometown over 30 years ago, and was eager to hear news from his family and hometown. Shortly after the visit Ibsen declared that he had overcome a writer's block

The Wild Duck (1884) is by many considered Ibsen's finest work, and it is certainly one of the most complex, alongside Rosmersholm. When working on the play, Ibsen received his only visit from a relative during his decades in exile, when 21-year old (Count) Christopher Paus paid an extended visit to him in Rome. Jørgen Haave notes that Ibsen "had not been this close to his own family since he left his hometown over 30 years ago", and he was eager to hear news from his family and hometown. Shortly after the visit Ibsen declared that he had overcome a writer's block. The Wild Duck draws inspiration from Ibsen's family and tells the story of Gregers Werle – described by Ibsen scholar Jon Nygaard as representing the spirit of the Paus family – a young man who returns to his hometown after an extended exile, and who is reunited with his boyhood friend Hjalmar Ekdal. Over the course of the play, the many secrets that lie behind the Ekdals' apparently happy home are revealed to Gregers, who insists on pursuing the absolute truth, or the "Summons of the Ideal". Among these truths: Gregers' father impregnated his servant Gina, then married her off to Hjalmar to legitimize the child. Another man has been disgraced and imprisoned for a crime the elder Werle committed. Furthermore, while Hjalmar spends his days working on a wholly imaginary "invention", his wife is earning the household income.

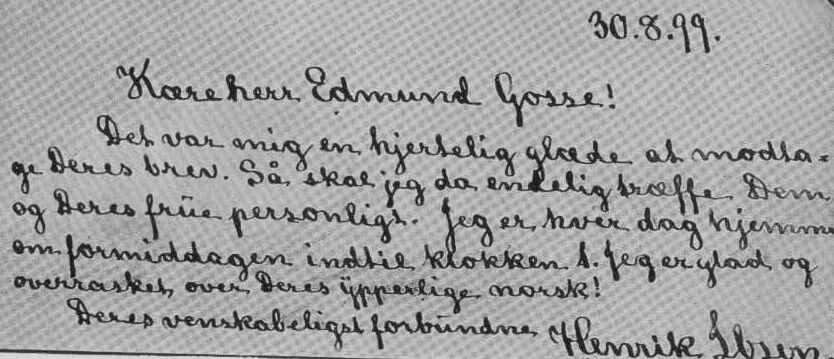
Letter from Ibsen to his English reviewer and translator Edmund Gosse: "30.8.[18]99. Dear Mr. Edmund Gosse! It was to me a hearty joy to receive your letter. So I will finally personally meet you and your wife. I am at home every day in the morning until 1 o'clock. I am happy and surprised at your excellent Norwegian! Your amicably obliged Henrik Ibsen."

Late in his career, Ibsen turned to a more introspective drama that had much less to do with denunciations of society's moral values and more to do with the problems of individuals. In such later plays as Hedda Gabler (1890) and The Master Builder (1892), Ibsen explored psychological conflicts that transcended a simple rejection of current conventions. Hedda Gabler and A Doll's House are regularly cited as Ibsen's most popular and influential plays, with the title role of Hedda regarded as one of the most challenging and rewarding for an actress even in the present day.

Ibsen intentionally obscured his influences. However, asked later what he had read when he wrote Catiline, Ibsen replied that he had read only the Danish Norse saga-inspired Romantic tragedian Adam Oehlenschläger and Ludvig Holberg, "the Scandinavian Molière".

== Influences ==
A major influence on Ibsen were Danish writers, such as Meïr Aron Goldschmidt and Georg Brandes, as well as his collaboration and friendship with the early Realist Swedish poet Carl Snoilsky.

== Death and legacy ==
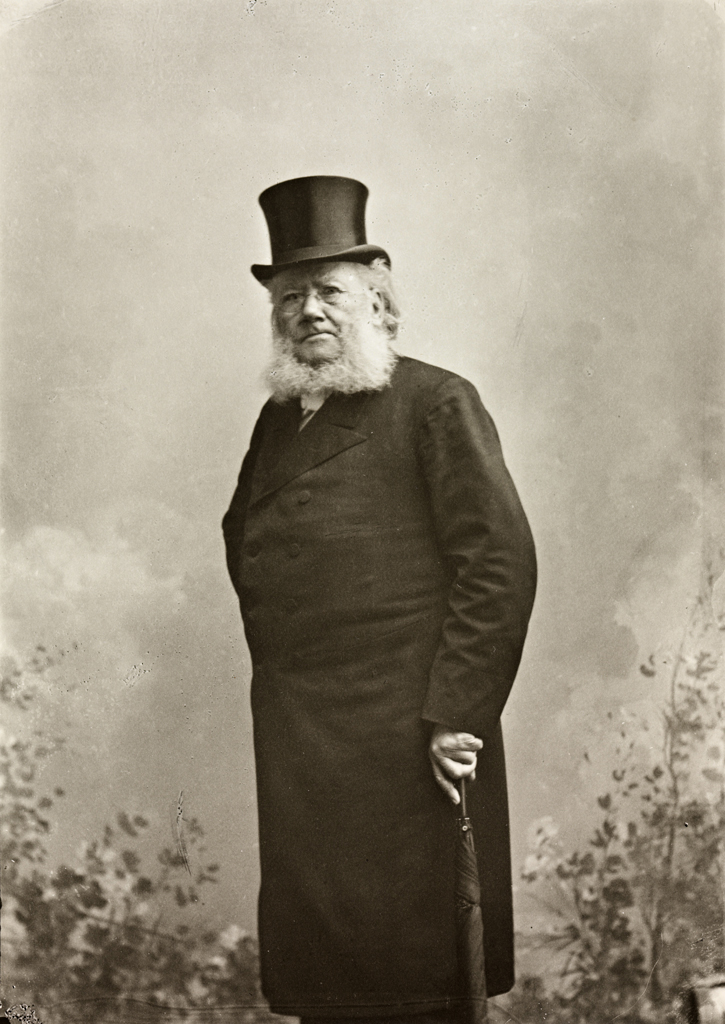
Ibsen, late in his career

On 23 May 1906, Ibsen died in his home at Arbins gade 1 in Kristiania (now Oslo) after a series of strokes in March 1900. When, on 22 May, his nurse assured a visitor that he was a little better, Ibsen spluttered his last words "On the contrary" ("Tvertimod!"). He died the following day at 2:30 pm. Ibsen was buried in Vår Frelsers gravlund ("The Graveyard of Our Savior") in central Oslo.

The 100th anniversary of Ibsen's death in 2006 was commemorated with an "Ibsen year" in Norway and other countries. In 2006, the homebuilding company Selvaag also opened Peer Gynt Sculpture Park in Oslo, Norway, in Henrik Ibsen's honour, making it possible to follow the dramatic play Peer Gynt scene by scene. Will Eno's adaptation of Ibsen's Peer Gynt, titled Gnit, had its world premiere at the 37th Humana Festival of New American Plays in March 2013. On 23 May 2006, The Ibsen Museum in Oslo re-opened to the public, with the house, where Ibsen had spent his last eleven years, completely restored with the original interior, colours, and decor.

Ivo de Figueiredo argues that "today, Ibsen belongs to the world. But it is impossible to understand [Ibsen's] path out there without knowing the Danish cultural sphere from which he sprang, from which he liberated himself and which he ended up shaping. Ibsen developed as a person and artist in a dialogue with Danish theater and literature that was anything but smooth." On the occasion of the 100th anniversary of Ibsen's death in 2006, the Norwegian government organised the Ibsen Year, which included celebrations around the world. The NRK produced a miniseries on Ibsen's childhood and youth in 2006, An Immortal Man. Several prizes are awarded in his name, among them the International Ibsen Award, the Norwegian Ibsen Award, and the Ibsen Centennial Commemoration Award.

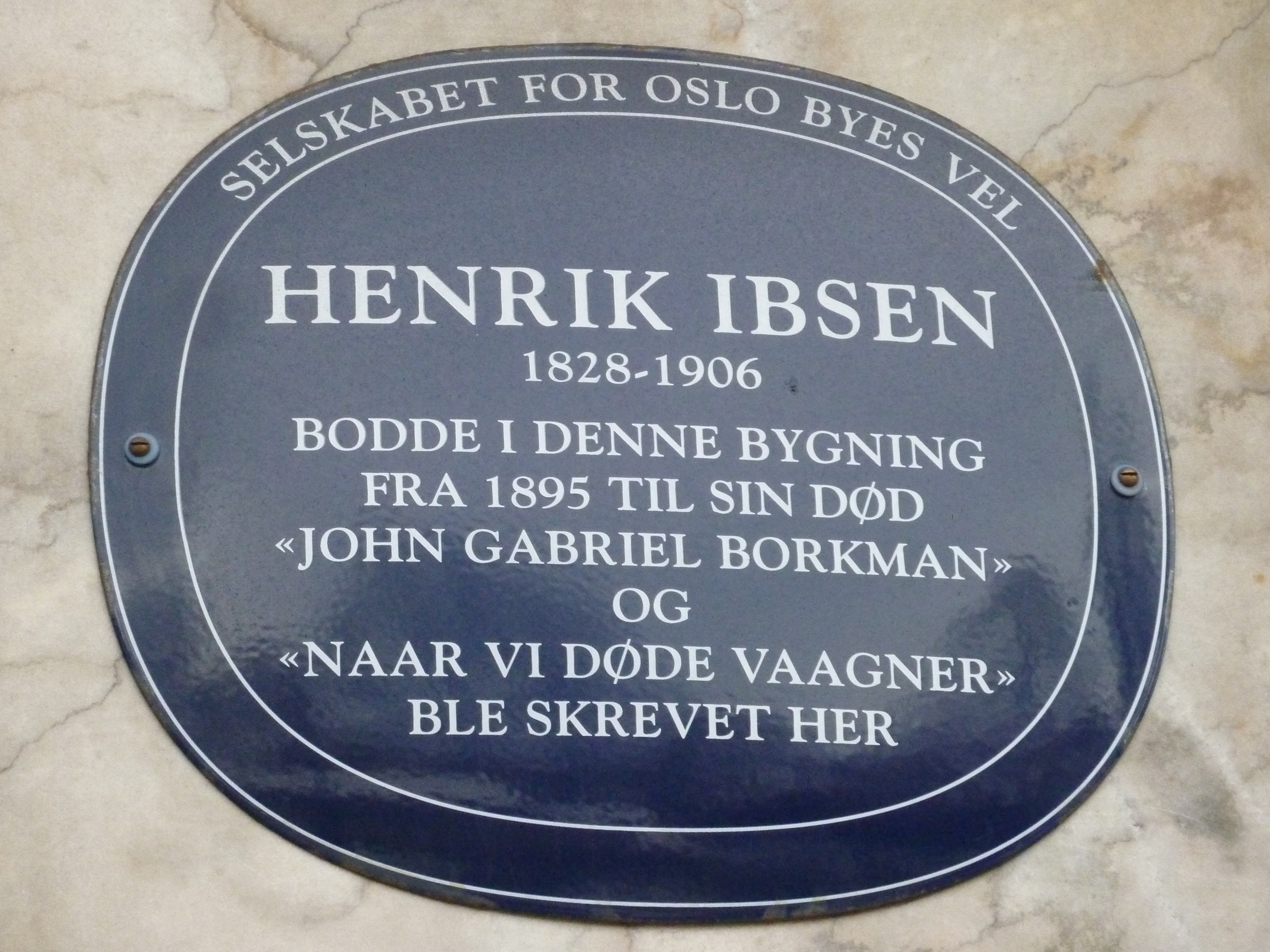
Plaque to Ibsen, Oslo marking his home from 1828–1906

Every year, since 2008, the annual "Delhi Ibsen Festival", is held in Delhi, India, organized by the Dramatic Art and Design Academy (DADA) in collaboration with The Royal Norwegian Embassy in India. It features plays by Ibsen, performed by artists from various parts of the world in varied languages and styles. The Ibsen Society of America (ISA) was founded in 1978 at the close of the Ibsen Sesquicentennial Symposium held in New York City to mark the 150th anniversary of Henrik Ibsen's birth. Distinguished Ibsen translator and critic Rolf Fjelde, Professor of Literature at Pratt Institute and the chief organizer of the Symposium, was elected Founding President. In December 1979, the ISA was certified as a non-profit corporation under the laws of the State of New York. Its purpose is to foster through lectures, readings, performances, conferences, and publications an understanding of Ibsen's works as they are interpreted as texts and produced on stage and in film and other media. An annual newsletter, Ibsen News and Comment, is distributed to all members.

== Critical reception ==
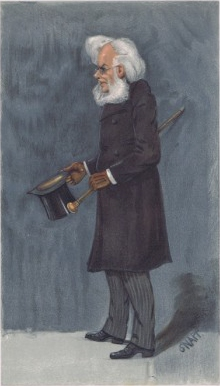
Ibsen caricatured by SNAPP for Vanity Fair, 1901

At the time when Ibsen was writing, literature was emerging as a formidable force in 19th century society. With the vast increase in literacy towards the end of the century, the possibilities of literature being used for subversion struck horror into the heart of the Establishment. Ibsen's plays, from A Doll's House onwards, caused an uproar—not just in Norway, but throughout Europe, and even across the Atlantic in America. No other artist, apart from Richard Wagner, had such an effect internationally, inspiring almost blasphemous adoration and hysterical abuse.

After the publication of Ghosts, he wrote: "while the storm lasted, I have made many studies and observations and I shall not hesitate to exploit them in my future writings". Indeed, his next play, An Enemy of the People, was initially regarded by the critics to be simply his response to the violent criticism which had greeted Ghosts. Ibsen expected criticism; as he wrote to his publisher: "Ghosts will probably cause alarm in some circles, but it can't be helped. If it did not, there would have been no necessity for me to have written it."

Ibsen not only read critical reactions to his plays but also actively corresponded with critics, publishers, theatre directors, and newspaper editors on the subject. The interpretation of his work, both by critics and directors, concerned him greatly. He often advised directors on which actor or actress would be suitable for a particular role. An example of this is a letter he wrote to Hans Schroder in November 1884, with detailed instructions for the production of The Wild Duck.

Ibsen's plays initially reached a far wider audience as read plays rather than in performance. It was 20 years, for instance, before the authorities would allow Ghosts to be performed in Norway. Each new play that Ibsen wrote, from 1879 onwards, had an explosive effect on intellectual circles. This was greatest for A Doll's House and Ghosts, and it did lessen with the later plays, but the translation of Ibsen's works into German, French, and English during the decade following the initial publication of each play—as well as frequent new productions as and when permission was granted—meant that Ibsen remained a topic of lively conversation throughout the latter decades of the 19th century. When A Doll's House was published, it had an explosive effect: it was the centre of every conversation at every social gathering in Christiania. One hostess even wrote on the invitations to her soirée, "You are politely requested not to mention Mr Ibsen's new play".

Earlier critics portrayed Ibsen as an embattled avant-gardist misunderstood by a hostile public, but Ibsen scholars Narve Fulsås and Tore Rem reject this view: "Such evidence does not conform to the picture of hostility and isolation, quite the contrary." They argue that in Norway, "Ibsen's home market soon provided him with an astonishingly wide and attentive audience, both as book and theatre author", and by the late 1870s "Ibsen had already left the professors behind in terms of income. He was closer to a member of the cabinet and clearly a well-established author, financially as in other respects." Politically, he kept distance from both wings of the new Left. During the 1880s controversies, "Ibsen had little sympathy with his persecuted colleagues" such as Hans Jæger and Christian Krohg, writing that Jæger's Fra Kristiania-Bohêmen was "crude" and that "our people are still not even near to being ready for the ideas of freedom". He "did not join either side" in the split between radicals and moderates, regarding the illusions of the Left with detached irony: "They imagined that a leader of the Opposition would and could remain the same after he got into power." By the end of the 1880s, even conservatives celebrated him. Aftenposten's special issue for his sixtieth anniversary "represents a strong exercise in canonisation. Aftenposten even made more out of the celebrations than the liberal newspapers, who now confidently considered Ibsen their own". The paper's critic Bredo Morgenstierne affirmed that Ibsen had "met with critical approval right from his debut", and the author gratefully replied that he felt "most at home" among such readers. As Fulsås and Rem conclude, "Ibsen's literary mastery was generally beyond question and he commanded an unprecedented respect." His name itself had become symbolic capital: "It was rather a question of defending 'Ibsen' from Ibsen."

Ibsen was nominated for the Nobel Prize in Literature in 1902, 1903, and 1904.

Ibsen was also a key figure in Japanese drama and greatly influenced the Shingeki movement; Kunio Yanagita established the Ipusen-kai, an Ibsen Society in 1903, and shortly before Ibsen's death, Hogetsu Shimamura declared an "Age of Ibsen" in Japan. Ibsen's Borkman was a particularly well received play with several contemporary translations, including one by Mori Ōgai. Amidst different schools of thought between Ōgai and Tsubouchi Shōyō over if respectively, Ibsen or Shakespeare would be best to bridge differences between Japanese and European theatre, the scholarly consensus has been that, "Ibsen marked the birth of modern drama in Japan".

== Personal life ==
=== Ancestry ===
Monogram of Henrik Ibsen

Ibsen's ancestry has been a much studied subject, due to both his perceived foreignness and the influence of his biography and family on his plays. Ibsen often made references to his family in his plays, sometimes by name, or by modelling characters after them.

The oldest documented member of the Ibsen family was ship's captain Rasmus Ibsen (1632–1703) from Stege, Denmark. His son, ship's captain Peder Ibsen, became a burgher of Bergen in Norway in 1726. Henrik Ibsen had Danish, German, Norwegian, and some distant Scottish ancestry. Most of his ancestors belonged to the merchant class of original Danish and German extraction, and many of his ancestors were ship's captains.

Ibsen's biographer Henrik Jæger famously wrote in 1888 that Ibsen did not have a drop of Norwegian blood in his veins, stating that "the ancestral Ibsen was a Dane". This, however, is not completely accurate; notably through his grandmother Hedevig Paus, Ibsen was descended from the Paus family, often considered one of the oldest families in Norway. Ibsen's ancestors had mostly lived in Norway for several generations, even though many had foreign ancestry.

The name Ibsen is originally a patronymic, meaning "son of Ib" (Ib is a Danish variant of Jacob). The patronymic became "frozen", i.e. it became a permanent family name, in the 17th century. The phenomenon of patronymics becoming frozen started in the 17th century in bourgeois families in Denmark, and the practice was only widely adopted in Norway from around 1900.

=== Descendants ===
From his marriage with Suzannah Thoresen, Ibsen had one son: lawyer, government minister, and Norwegian Prime Minister Sigurd Ibsen. Sigurd Ibsen married Bergljot Bjørnson, the daughter of Bjørnstjerne Bjørnson. Their son was Tancred Ibsen, who became a film director and was married to Lillebil Ibsen; their only child was diplomat Tancred Ibsen, Jr. His male line together with the male-descended lines of the wider Ibsen family he belonged to will end with the deaths of Tancred Jr.'s two daughters. Sigurd Ibsen's daughter, Irene Ibsen, married Josias Bille, a member of the Danish ancient noble Bille family; their son was Danish actor Joen Bille. Ibsen had an illegitimate child early in his life, not entitled to the family name or inheritance. This line ended with his biological grandchildren.

=== Political views ===
In a letter to George Brandes shortly before the Paris Commune, Ibsen expressed anarchist views that Brandes later positively related to the Paris Commune. Ibsen wrote that the state "is the curse of the individual. ... The state must be abolished." Brandes related that Ibsen "presented to me as political ideals, conditions and ideas whose nature did not seem to me quite clear, but which were unquestionably akin to those that were proclaimed precisely one month later, in an extremely distorted form, by the Parisian commune". And in another letter shortly before the Commune came to an end, Ibsen expressed a disappointment with the Commune, insofar as it did not go far enough in its anarchism in its rejection of the state and private property. Ibsen wrote, "Is it not impudent of the commune in Paris to go and destroy my admirable state theory, or rather no state theory? The idea is now ruined for a long time to come, and I cannot even set it forth in verse with any propriety." However, Ibsen nevertheless expressed an optimism, asserting that his "no state theory" bears "within itself a healthy core" and that some day "it will be practised without any caricature".

Ibsen and his works are strongly identified with both the humanist and feminist social movements. His works rejected religion as an impediment to social reform, and Ibsen evinced a "lifelong skepticism toward bourgeois respectability". A speech given to the Norwegian Women's Rights League is sometimes mistranslated as saying he was a "humanist and not a feminist", although in context he appeared to have been humbly saying that his evident commitment to women's rights was part and parcel of a broader commitment to humanism, to "lift up humanity to a higher plane".

== Works ==
=== Plays ===
Plays entirely or partly in verse are marked ^{v}.

- 1850 Catiline (Catilina)^{v}. First published under pseudonym of Brynjolf Bjarme.
- 1850 The Burial Mound also known as The Warrior's Barrow (Kjæmpehøjen)^{v}
- 1852 St. John's Eve (Sancthansnatten)^{v} (Note: Only the prologue is in verse, the rest is in prose.)
- 1854 Lady Inger of Oestraat (Fru Inger til Østeraad)
- 1855 The Feast at Solhaug (Gildet paa Solhaug)^{v} (Note: In a combination of prose and verse.)
- 1856 Olaf Liljekrans (Olaf Liljekrans)^{v} (Note: In a combination of prose and verse.)
- 1858 The Vikings at Helgeland (Hærmændene paa Helgeland)
- 1862 Love's Comedy (Kjærlighedens Komedie)^{v}
- 1863 The Pretenders (Kongs-Emnerne)^{v} (Note: Mainly in prose, with a few speeches in verse.)
- 1866 Brand (Brand)^{v}
- 1867 Peer Gynt (Peer Gynt)^{v}
- 1869 The League of Youth (De unges Forbund)
- 1873 Emperor and Galilean (Kejser og Galilæer)
- 1877 Pillars of Society (Samfundets Støtter)
- 1879 A Doll's House (Et Dukkehjem)
- 1881 Ghosts (Gengangere)
- 1882 An Enemy of the People (En Folkefiende)
- 1884 The Wild Duck (Vildanden)
- 1886 Rosmersholm (Rosmersholm)
- 1888 The Lady from the Sea (Fruen fra Havet)
- 1890 Hedda Gabler (Hedda Gabler)
- 1892 The Master Builder (Bygmester Solness)
- 1894 Little Eyolf (Lille Eyolf)
- 1896 John Gabriel Borkman (John Gabriel Borkman)
- 1899 When We Dead Awaken (Når vi døde vaagner)

=== Other works ===
- 1851 Norma or a Politician's Love (Norma eller en Politikers Kjaerlighed), an eight-page political parody (Note: Though sometimes identified as a play, Norma was never intended for performance. This "juvenile polemical work" was an attack on the Norwegian parliament or Storting, identifying several legislators by name as "fortune hunters". It first appeared anonymously in the satirical magazine Andhrimner. Using play-like dialog and the names of characters from Bellini's opera Norma, Ibsen's hero chooses the "passive" female who represents the government over the heroic title character representing the opposition.)
- 1860 Svanhild – incomplete prosaic comedy
- 1871 Digte – only released collection of poetry, included Terje Vigen (written in 1862 but published in Digte from 1871)

=== English translations ===
Major translation projects include:

- The Collected Works of Henrik Ibsen, in twelve volumes, edited by William Archer (Heinemann, 1906–1912). 21 plays.
- The Oxford Ibsen, edited by James McFarlane (Oxford, 1960–1977). The most comprehensive version available.
- Michael Meyer's translations (1960–1986). Fourteen plays.
- Ibsen: The Complete Major Prose Plays, translated by Rolf G. Fjelde (Plume, 1978). Twelve plays.
- Eight Plays, translated by Eva Le Gallienne (Modern Library, 1982).
- Ibsen's Selected Plays: A Norton Critical Edition, edited by Brian Johnston, with translations by Brian Johnston and Rick Davis (W. W. Norton, 2004). Five plays.
- Ibsen – 3 Plays (Kenneth McLeish & Stephen Mulrine, translators (Nick Hern Books, 2005)
- The New Penguin Ibsen, in four volumes, edited by Tore Rem, with translations by Anne-Marie Stanton-Ife, Barbara Haveland, Deborah Dawkin, Erik Skuggevik and Geoffrey Hill (Penguin, 2014–2019). Fourteen plays.

== Accolades and honours ==
Ibsen was decorated Knight in 1873, Commander in 1892, and with the Grand Cross of the Order of St. Olav in 1893. He received the Grand Cross of the Danish Order of the Dannebrog, and the Grand Cross of the Swedish Order of the Polar Star, and was Knight, First Class of the Order of Vasa.

Well known stage directors in Austria and Germany such as Theodor Lobe (1833–1905), Paul Barnay (1884–1960), Max Burckhard (1854–1912), Otto Brahm (1856–1912), Carl Heine (1861–1927), Paul Albert Glaeser-Wilken (1874–1942), Victor Barnowsky (1875–1952), Eugen Robert (1877–1944), Leopold Jessner (1878–1945), Ludwig Barnay (1884–1960), Alfred Rotter (1886–1933), Fritz Rotter (1888–1939), Paul Rose (1900–1973) and Peter Zadek (1926–2009), all directed productions of Ibsen's work.

In 2011 Håkon Anton Fagerås made two busts in bronze of Ibsen—one for Parco Ibsen in Sorrento, Italy, and one in Skien kommune. In 2012, Håkon Anton Fagerås sculpted a statue in marble of Ibsen for the Ibsen Museum in Oslo.

Some other things named after Ibsen include:

- 2006 was declared the Ibsen Year by the Norwegian government
- The asteroid 5696 Ibsen, named in his memory in 1995
- The Ibsen crater on the planet Mercury
- The Ibsenhuset arts complex in Oslo, Norway
- The ship MS Henrik Ibsen
- Lake Ibsen and the Lake Ibsen Township in North Dakota, USA
- Bust of Henrik Ibsen in Tacoma, Washington, United States.
- Ibsen quotes, Oslo
- Peer Gynt Sculpture Park was created in honour of Ibsen

== See also ==
- Centre for Ibsen Studies
- Ibsen Studies
- Norwegian Ibsen Award
- Naturalism (theatre)
- Nineteenth-century theatre
- Problem play
