= Peer Gynt Sculpture Park =

Park in Oslo, Norway

Coordinates: 59°55′54″N 10°47′32″E

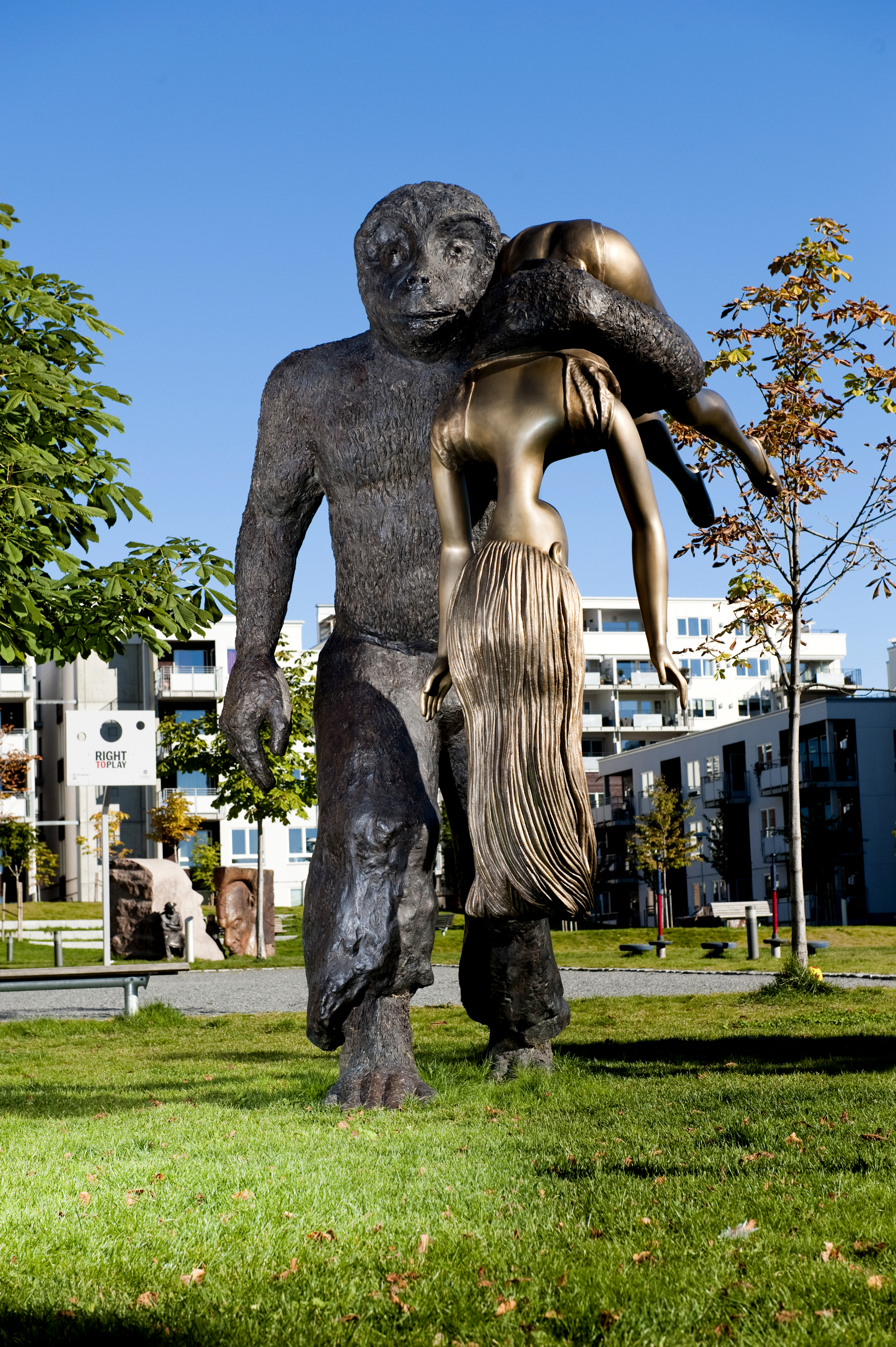
The Abduction by Jim Dine

Peer Gynt Sculpture Park (Peer Gynt-parken) is a sculpture park located in Oslo, Norway. The sculpture park was created in honour of the Norwegian writer Henrik Ibsen as a monumental presentation of one of his plays, Peer Gynt, act by act.

The park was established in 2006 by Selvaag, the company behind the housing development in the Løren area, and most of the sculptures are the result of an international sculpture competition. Selvaag was founded by Olav Selvaag and is a family-owned company that has placed sculptures in residential areas for more than 50 years, with over 500 sculptures in total.

== The competition ==
The sculptures placed in Peer Gynt Sculpture Park come from an open, international competition of the designs for the best figurative sculptures depicting scenes from Henrik Ibsen's drama Peer Gynt. The host of the competition is Selvaag, the parent company of several subsidiaries. The members of the jury are director Ellen Horn from the Norwegian Riksteatret, sculptor Kirsten Kokkin, Prof. Vigdis Ystad from Senter for Ibsenstudier (the Centre for Ibsen Studies), Kim Brandstrup from Galleri Brandstrup, Peder Lund from Lund Fine Art, artist Kristian Blystad, and Ole Gunnar Selvaag, one of Selvaag's owners and the founder of the Peer Gynt Sculpture Park.

== The sculptures ==
The Peer Gynt Sculpture Park is unique because famous sculptors from many countries have each interpreted a piece of a play. So far 20 sculptures have been placed in the park:

- Peer Gynt, Man of the World by Nina Sundbye, Norway
- The Wild Buck Ride by Andrea Bucci, Italy
- The Devil in the Nut by Enzo Cucchi, Italy
- The Abduction by Jim Dine, United States
- Peer and three girls by Sergey Eylanbekov, United States/Russia
- Trolls with Pig Heads by Christine Aspelund, Norway
- Peers kamp mot Bøygen by Fredrik Raddum, Norway
- Solvejg at the newly-built hut by Wolf Bröll, Germany
- Peer by Aase's deathbed by Kinga Smaczna-Lagowska, Poland
- Peer and the Monkeys by Petter Hepsø, Norway
- Peer at the Emperor's Horse, wearing the Emperor's clothes by Piotr Grzegorek, Poland
- Anitras dance by Leopoldo Emperador, Spain
- Peer and Anitra in the Desert by Elena Engelsen and Per Ung, Norway
- Where the starting point is crazy minimal, the outcome is highly original by Anna Passakas and Radoslaw Kudlinski, Poland
- Peer Meets Begriffenfeldt at the Mental Asylum by Harald Müller, Germany
- Peer and the strange passenger by Mats Åberg, Sweden
- The Onion - layer by layer by Ferdinand Wyller, Norway
- The Button Moulder by Kamila Szejnoch, Poland
- The thin Priest with a fowling net by Eamonn O'Doherty, Ireland
- The meeting between Solvejg, Peer and the Button Moulder by Jan Kolasinski, Poland
