= Aristocracy of officials =

Term for Norwegian historical period

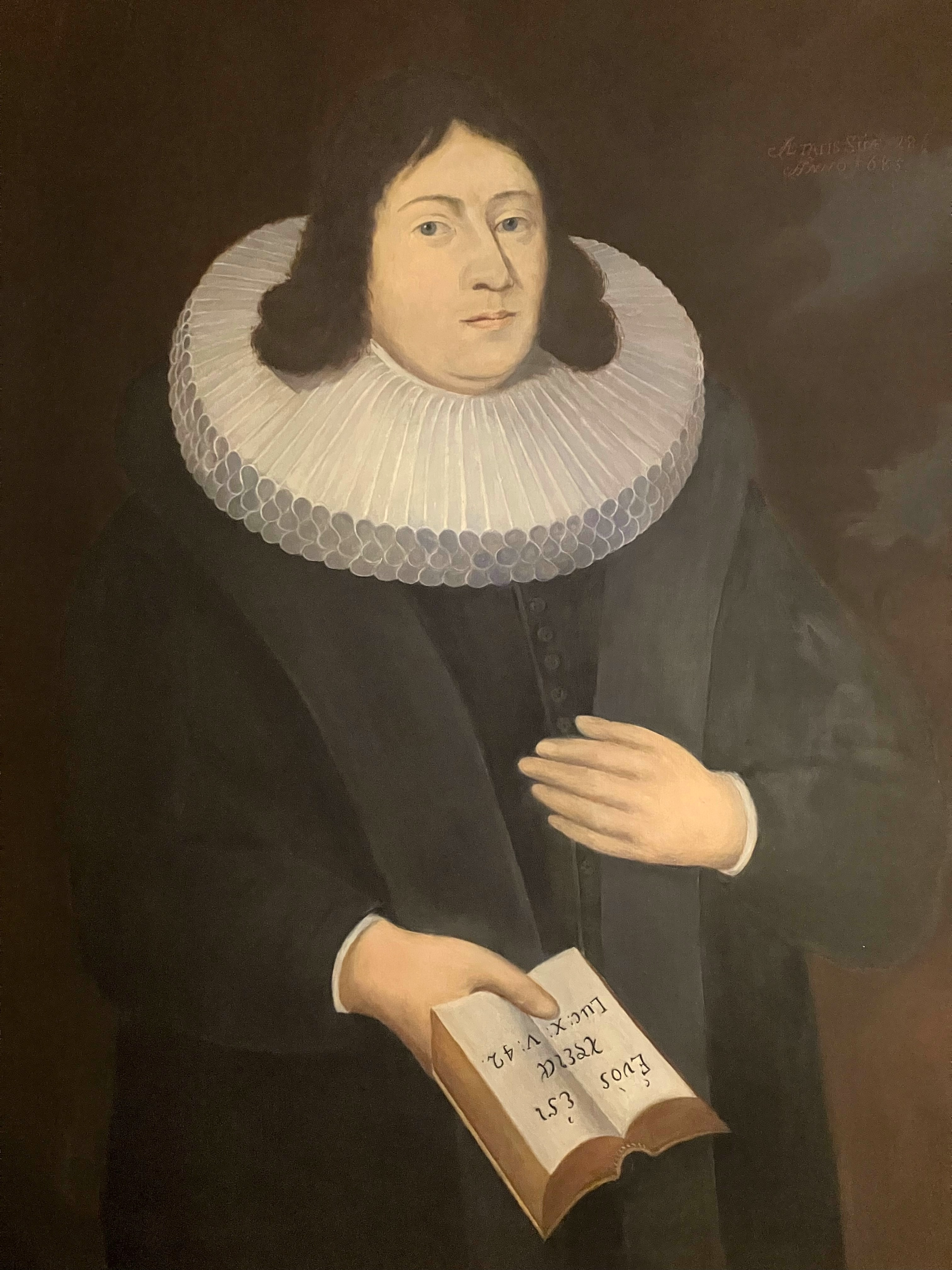
Hans Povelsson Paus (1656–1715) was a representative of the Upper Telemark aristocracy of officials, an elite of priests and lawyers ruling the region for centuries.

"Aristocracy of officials" and "civil service aristocracy" (Danish: embedsaristokratiet, Norwegian: embetsaristokratiet) are terms used by historians to denote the elite social class (aristocracy) of university-educated higher state officials in Denmark and Norway from the early modern period until the 19th century. Norway’s traditional nobility all but collapsed after the Reformation (1537) and was formally abolished in 1821. The aristocracy of officials filled the vacant position at the top of society at the local, regional and national levels. Vidar L. Haanes notes that "in Norway the aristocracy of officials occupied the position in society held by the nobility elsewhere in Europe". Whereas most European nations at the time were typically dominated by a noble class, in Norway, clergy and lawyers were, between the 17th and 19th centuries, broadly the apex of the social pyramid, especially outside the cities. By the 19th century Norway is widely considered to have been a "Civil Servant State," reflecting the role of the civil servants as "the most enduring, consistent and visible elite." This social group has with reference to the 19th century also been called "the thousand academic families" by the historian Jens Arup Seip, and they comprised less than one per thousand in the overall population. In the 17th and 18th centuries, they likely comprised a few hundred families at most. It was a far smaller elite than the nobility of many other countries. (Note: The noble percentage around the 18th century was roughly 15% in the Polish–Lithuanian Commonwealth, 7–8% in Spain, 5% in Hungary, 2–3% in Russia, 1% in France, 0.5% in Sweden. In Norway, the nobility made up a negligible portion of the population—just 0.006% by 1660—and the noble class was formally abolished in 1821. By comparison the "aristocracy of officials" in Norway comprised less than 0.1% by the 19th century; in other words, it was a smaller elite than the nobility of many other countries.)

== History ==
A higher official (embedsmand) in Denmark-Norway was by definition an official who had been appointed directly by the King, as opposed to lower officials. They included not only higher central government officials, but also all priests of the state church, all judges, lawyers (until the mid 19th century), county governors, university professors, military commissioned officers and other groups. This class is also frequently referred to as the estate of the officials (embedsstanden or embedsmandsstanden with different spellings), although the officials did never formally constitute an estate of the realm in the legal sense (with the exception of the clergy, who until the 19th century de jure formed one of the two privileged estates, although the estates had de facto lost much of their importance with the introduction of absolute monarchy in 1660). The term "aristocracy of officials" appears to have entered usage in the early 19th century.

The "aristocracy of officials" was distinct from the nobility (adel). Some members of the class of officials were noble, while the vast majority were not. In Norway, "what little was left of the Norwegian nobility, which had constituted the elite in the country during the Middle Ages, quickly withered away after 1537." By 1600 Norway only had about a hundred men considered as nobles, and their number declined to only 30 by 1660, of a population of around 440,000 (i.e. 0.006%), far below typical percentages in other countries. While most European countries were dominated by a noble class, in Norway "other social groups came to fill the vacant position at the top of society, burghers and officials."

Since the 16th century, offices in Denmark and Norway were also increasingly awarded based on merits and education, leading to the disappearance of the lower nobility as local elites, especially in Norway, as they were very often unable to afford costly university education abroad, and its gradual replacement as an elite by a class of university-educated higher officials, often of Danish or German origin. This development continued with the introduction of absolute and hereditary monarchy in 1660 in Denmark, which significantly weakened the political power of the still influential Danish nobility in favour of the King and the state administration and officials directly subordinate to the King. The kings from the 17th century and later periods tended to increasingly appoint non-nobles to state offices, to which nobles previously had had a monopoly, and noble status in the absolute monarchy came to be seen as mostly symbolic. Norway was different from Denmark in the fact that the Danish nobility still comprised a significant number and were wealthy and at least socially, if not politically, influential, while the nobility as a group was both politically, socially and economically insignificant, and increasingly so, in Norway. Nobility was formally abolished by the Norwegian Parliament in 1821, at which point the nobility comprised only a few families, virtually all of which were untitled, recently ennobled or foreign noble families rather than descendants of the original Norwegian nobility. Most had usually in practice bought their noble status from the Danish king in the 18th century, but this new status carried few privileges. The formal nobility also excluded many of the country's wealthiest families, who saw no need to buy a letters patent. The few who did, like Anker, tended to produce fabricated genealogies to justify their claim. In practice Norway did not have a broad or enduring hereditary noble class.

In most rural localities and districts in Norway, the local and regional clergy (such as parish priests and provosts) and the district judge were typically the foremost members of their communities from the 16–17th centuries and onwards, and in some cases, their offices were in practice semi-hereditary. Very often, the priest's estate was the largest and most prominent farm or estate in any given community. They symbolically mediated between the Crown and the people. According to Hoffmann, "the priests were an important part of the aristocracy of officials. They were the representatives of the king in their districts." During the absolute monarchy, the priests were "an important instrument for royal power in the local communities. The priest was the representative of the state, both in the religious area and other areas of society."

Vidar L. Haanes notes:

The church and the priests had power over the symbols. They performed the rites of life which in the Norwegian context were associated with baptism, confirmation, communion, wedding and funeral. The Church interpreted reality. The priests represented the sacred, the organizing power of life (Eliade 1969). At the same time, they represented the King, with the symbols, e.g. education, Latin, official dress and official estate, and all the mythology that could be attached to this purely secular power structure. Thus the church had power over the symbols. But the church and the priests also had symbolic power, as interpreters of the meaning of the social world (Bourdieu 1996: 40). The priests had the exclusive right to legitimate ideological production, and exercised power, not by violence, but by everyone perceiving and treating them as the only legitimate interpreters of the religion and stewards of the rituals of life. In the Norwegian culture of unity, there was consensus on the meaning of the social world. The structuring elements of the culture were taken for granted, supported by the Lutheran doctrine of supremacy which meant that all should remain in the condition God had set them, and be obedient to their superiors. The clergy belonged to the social class (official class) that controlled the ideology, or the ideological structure of society. (...) In Norway the aristocracy of officials occupied the position in society held by the nobility elsewhere in Europe.

— Vidar L. Haanes, "Det moderne gjennombrudd i Norge, frikirkeligheten og lavkirkeligheten"

Whereas most European nations at the time were typically dominated by a noble class, in Norway, clergy and lawyers were, between the 17th and 19th centuries, broadly the apex of the social pyramid, especially outside the cities. Norway during the 19th century is widely described as "the state of the officials" (Norwegian: embedsmannsstaten), reflecting the role of the officials as the dominant social and political class in the state at the national, regional and local level. The term "state of the officials" was introduced by the historian Jens Arup Seip, who also refers to this group as an "aristocracy of officials." According to Seip, "the thousand academic families" completely dominated the state and particularly the civil service, the government and the parliament during the 19th century. The historian Øystein Rian describes the aristocracy of officials in Norway as "a nobility-resembling elite;" in many respects they occupied a similar position in society as the French nobles of the Robe. According to Seip, this class had in common a university education, Danish language (with Norwegian pronunciation), often a Danish or German-sounding family name, and sympathies for and in many cases family or other ties to Denmark. They comprised less than one per thousand in the overall population. In comparison, in Western Europe around 3% of the population tended to be noble in several countries, in some countries such as the Polish–Lithuanian Commonwealth as many as 12%, in Spain around 8% and in France around 4% (including clergy). Therefore, the civil servant elite or "aristocracy of officials" in Norway was a significantly more exclusive—and better educated—group than the nobility of most other countries.

The civil servant class is also included in the broader term patriciate, together with the burghers in the cities.
