= Jon Nygaard =

Norwegian professor

- Born: 1946 (age 79–80)

Academic background
- Education: University of Oslo

Academic work
- Discipline: Ibsen studies Theatre studies
- Institutions: University of Oslo; University of Trondheim

Jon Nygaard (born 1946) is a Norwegian Ibsen scholar and professor emeritus at the Centre for Ibsen Studies at the University of Oslo. He represents the "aesthetic-historical" approach to Ibsen research and has advocated for a greater focus on viewing Ibsen and his works in the context of his contemporaries rather than as a genius.

Nygaard earned his PhD (mag.art.) at the University of Oslo in 1969, and the following year, he was appointed as a research fellow at the same university. In 1973, he became a lecturer in theater studies at the University of Trondheim and was promoted to associate professor there in 1975. From 1984 to 2016, he served as an associate professor and, from 2001, as a professor in theater studies at the University of Oslo.

His book on Henrik Ibsen's wider social milieu and ancestry contributed significantly to what scholars have described as a "revolution" in historical research on Henrik Ibsen's life, that has debunked numerous myths previously taken for granted.
