= Narve Fulsås =

Norwegian historian (born 1953)

Narve Fulsås (born 17 December 1953) is a Norwegian historian.

He was born in Numedal. He took his cand.philol. degree in 1983, and the dr.philos. degree in 1994. In 1998 he was appointed as a professor of modern history at the University of Tromsø. He was selected to the Norwegian Academy of Science and Letters in 2011.

His books include Universitetet i Tromsø 25 år (1993), Historie og nasjon. Ernst Sars og striden om norsk kultur (1999) og Havet, døden og vêret. Kulturell modernisering i Kyst-Noreg 1850-1950 (2003). He has also published Henrik Ibsen's letters with comments. In 2000 he won a prize from the Faculty of History and Philosophy at the University of Oslo for his work on Ernst Sars.
