= Vidar Leif Haanes =

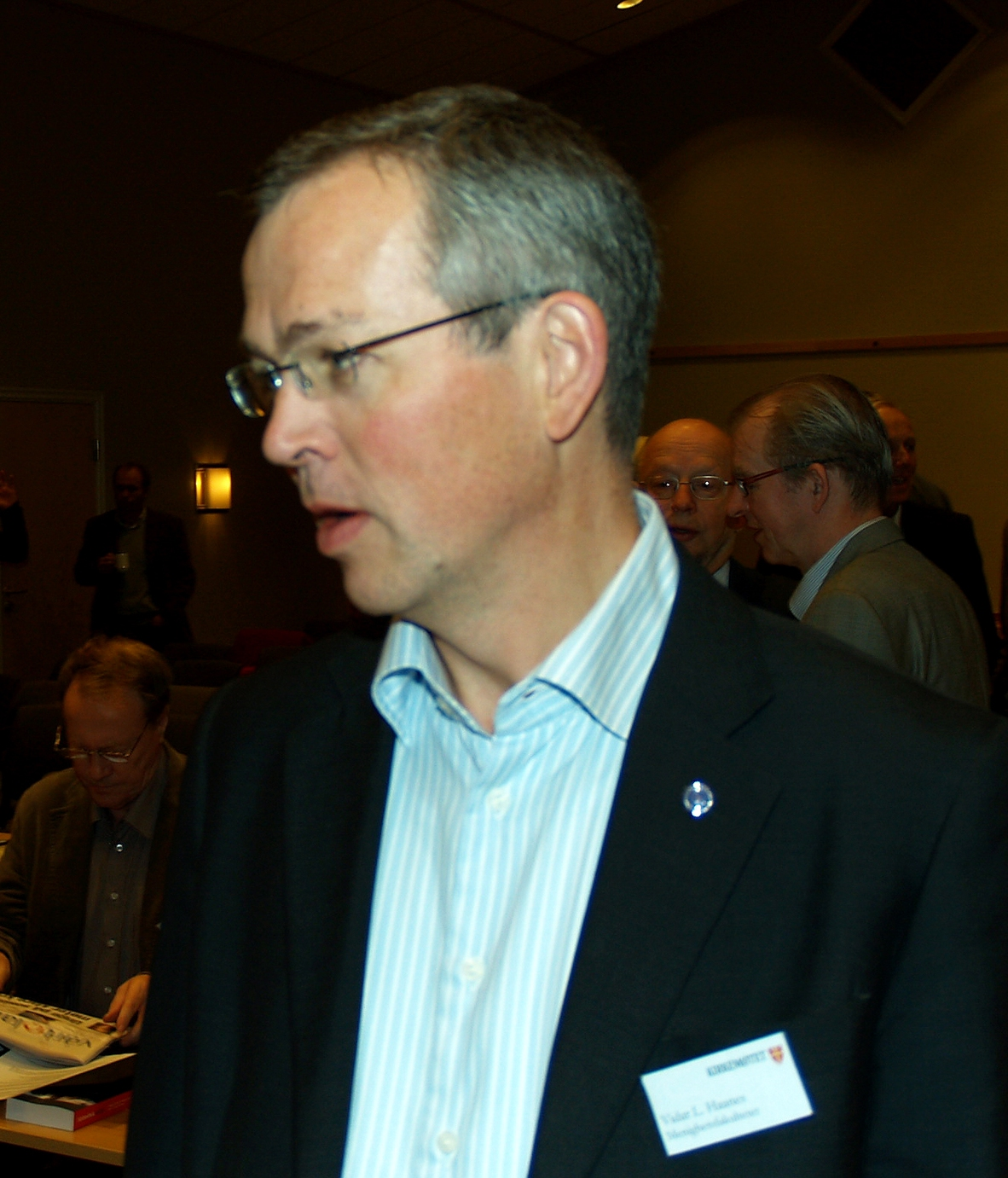
Vidar Leif Haanes is the president of MF Norwegian School of Theology. Image: MF Norwegian School of Theology

Vidar L. Haanes (born 27 April 1961, in Kristiansand) is a Norwegian professor of Church- and Intellectual History and rector of MF Norwegian School of Theology, Religion and Society, Oslo.

Vidar L. Haanes was President of Universities Norway (UHR, the Rectors Conference) 2015-17, and member of the Council of European University Association. He is board member of Nordic University Cooperation (NUS) and of Nordforsk under the Nordic Council of Ministers. He is chair of the board Faculty of Architecture and Design at the Norwegian University of Science and Technology. Haanes graduated from MF Norwegian School of Theology in 1985, was ordained 1986, Dr. Theol. 1998. He has written books and articles on theological education, Intellectual History, the Protestant Reformation and Norwegian-American history. He has edited Luthersk Kirketidende, Halvårsskrift for Praktisk Teologi and Nordic Journal of Religion and Society. He has more than 400 books, articles and interviews registered in CRISTIN -Current Research Information System In Norway - He is member of the Norwegian-American Historical Association and Agder Academy of Sciences and Letters, the General Synod and the Theological Commission in the Church of Norway, member of the Transatlantic Education Forum and board member of Kunnskap Oslo (Oslo Knowledge City)

He is a member of the Working Group on Higher Education & Research, European Federation of Education Employers, member of the Governing Board in OECD's Programme on Institutional Management in Higher Education (IMHE), member of the Council of Europe Advisory Committee on Higher Education for the Policy Steering Committee for Educational Policy and Practice (CDPPE).
