= Norwegian art =

History of fine art produced in the country of Norway

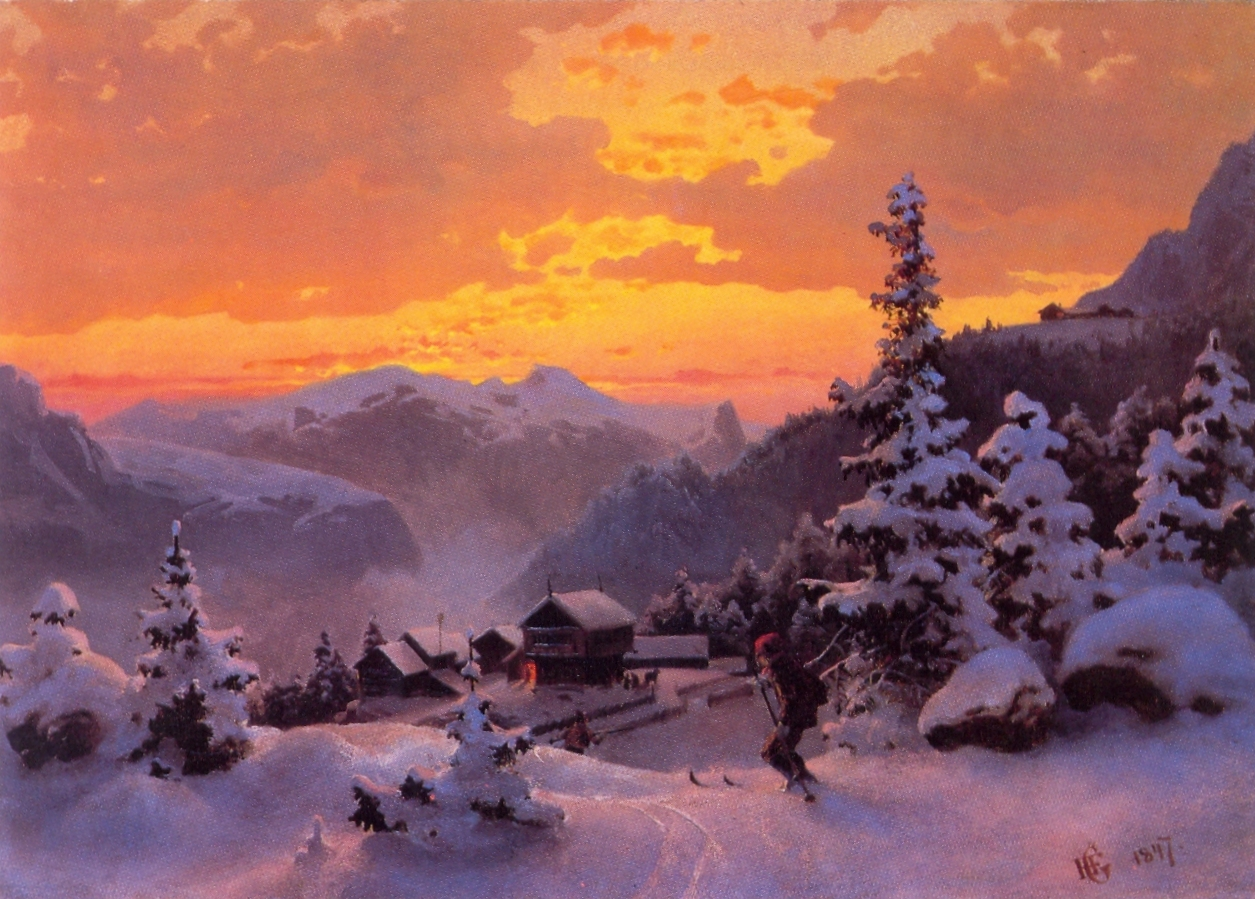
Hans Gude's Winter Afternoon (1847)

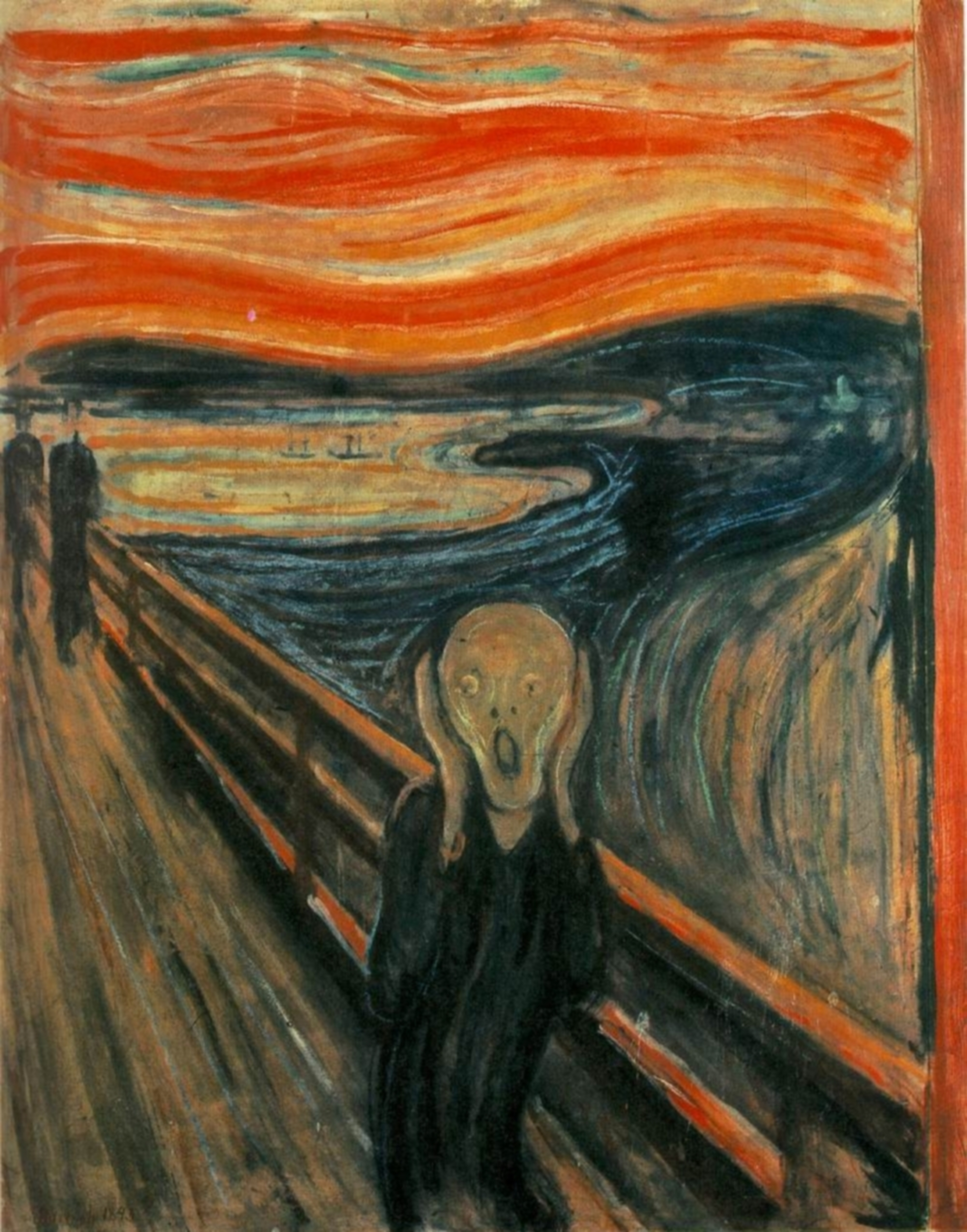
Edvard Munch's The Scream (1893)

For much of its history, Norwegian art is usually considered as part of the wider Nordic art of Scandinavia. It has, especially since about 1100 AD, been strongly influenced by wider trends in European art. After World War II, the influence of the United States strengthened substantially. Due to generous art subsidies, contemporary Norwegian art has a high production per capita.

Though usually not especially a major centre for art production or exporter of art, Norway has been relatively successful in keeping its art; in particular, the relatively mild nature of the Norwegian Reformation, and the lack of subsequent extensive rebuilding and redecoration of churches, has meant that with other Scandinavian countries, Norway has unusually rich survivals of medieval church paintings and fittings. One period when Nordic art exerted a strong influence over the rest of northern Europe was in Viking art, and there are many survivals, both in stone monuments left untouched around the countryside, and objects excavated in modern times.

The Reformation and the loss of a permanent royal court after the Kalmar Union of 1397 greatly disrupted Norwegian artistic traditions, and left the existing body of painters and sculptors without large markets. The requirements of the small aristocratic class were mainly for portraits, usually by imported artists, and it was not until the 19th century that significant numbers of Norwegians were trained in contemporary styles.

Norwegian art came into its own in the 19th century, especially with the early landscape painters. Until that time, the art scene in Norway had been dominated by imports from Germany and Holland and by the influence of Danish art. Initially with landscape painting, later with Impressionism and Realism. Though for the rest of the world Edvard Munch (1863–1944) is certainly Norway's great artistic figure, there have been many other significant figures.

== The beginnings ==
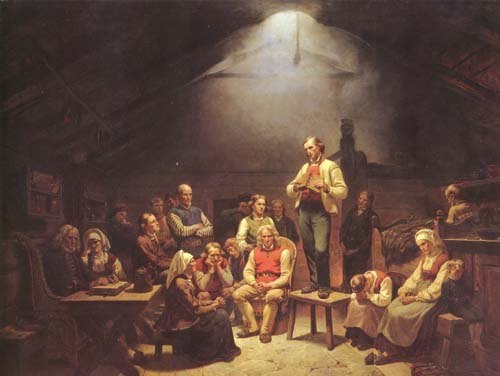
Adolph Tidemand's Haugianerne (Haugeans). 1852

Johan Christian Dahl (1788–1857) is often said to be the "father of Norwegian landscape painting". After a period in Copenhagen, he joined the Dresden school to which he made an important contribution. He eventually returned to paint the landscapes of western Norway, defining Norwegian painting for the first time.

Another important early contributor was Johannes Flintoe (1787–1870), a Danish-Norwegian painter, known for his Norwegian landscapes and paintings of folk costumes. He taught at the School of Drawing (Tegneskolen) in Christiania from 1819 to 1851 where his students included budding romanticists such as Hans Gude and Johan F. Eckersberg.

Adolph Tidemand (1814–1876) studied in Copenhagen, in Italy and finally in Düsseldorf where he settled. He often returned to Norway where he painted the old Norwegian farm culture. His best known painting is The bridal procession in Hardanger (together with Hans Gude, 1848) and Haugianerne (Haugeans) painted in 1852.

Norway’s new-found independence from Denmark encouraged painters to develop their Norwegian identity, especially with landscape painting by artists such as Kitty Kielland, 1843–1914, an early female painter who studied under Gude and Harriet Backer, 1845–1932, another pioneer among female artists, influenced by impressionism.

== Impressionists and neo-romanticists ==
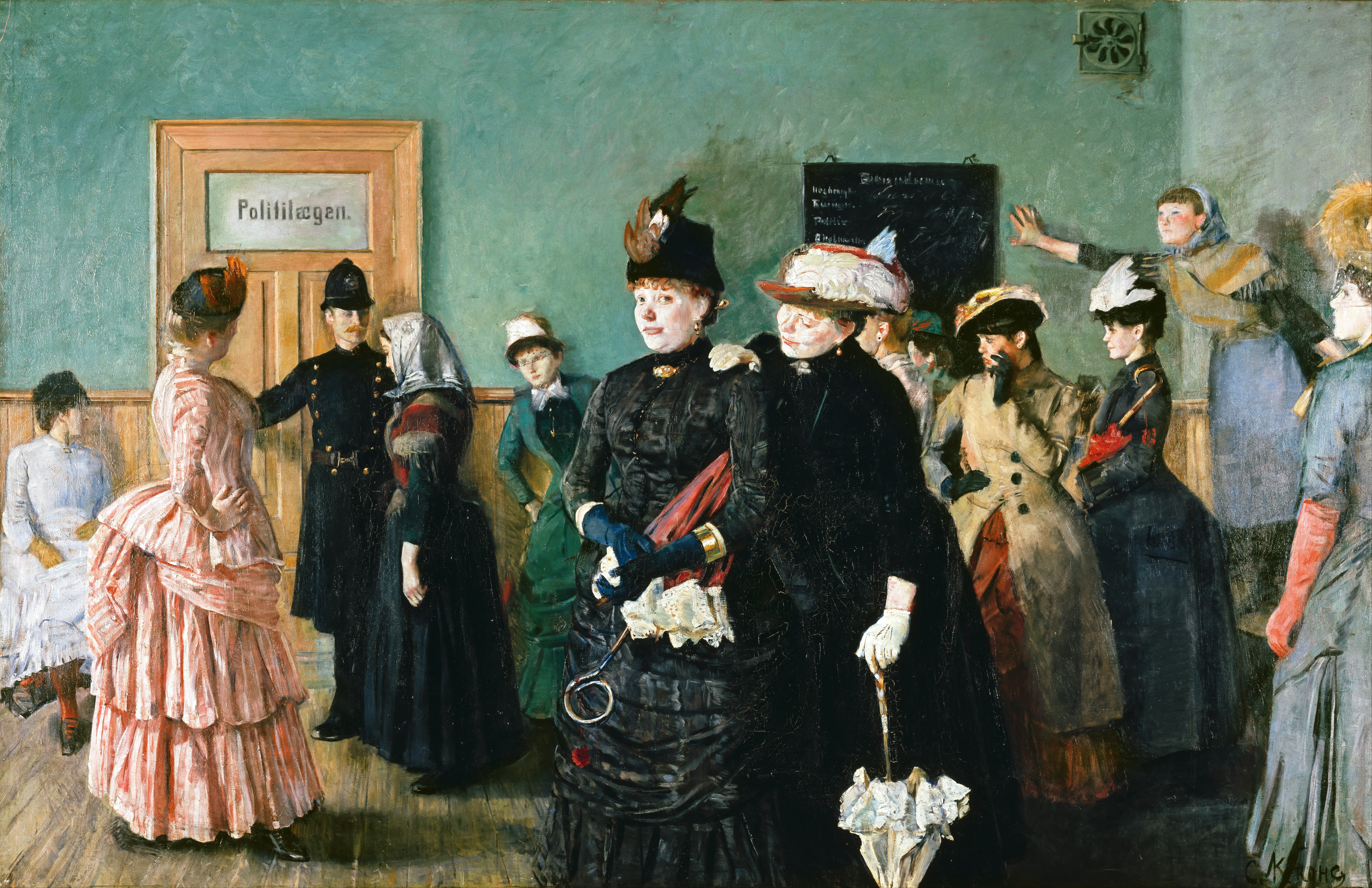
Christian Krohg, Albertine i politilægens venteværelse (Albertine at the Police Doctor's Waiting Room, 1885–1887)

Frits Thaulow, 1847–1906, an impressionist, was initially a student of Hans Gude. He was later influenced by the art scene in Paris where he developed impressionist talents. Returning to Norway in 1880, he became one of the leading figures on the Norwegian art scene, together with Christian Krohg and Erik Werenskiold.

Christian Krohg, 1852–1925, a realist painter, was also influenced by the Paris scene. He is remembered for his paintings of prostitutes which caused something of a scandal.

Thorolf Holmboe (1866–1935) studied under Hans Gude in Berlin between 1886 and 1887 and Fernand Cormon in Paris between 1889 and 1891. He was inspired by many different styles at different points in his career, including Naturalism, Neo-romanticism, Realism and Impressionism.

Jacob Gløersen (1854-1912) He studied with Olaf Isaachsen in Kristiansand in 1872, at Knud Bergslien's painting school from 1872 to 1875, and with Otto Seitz in Munich in 1880. His realism reflected an unsentimental image of the Norwegian peasants daily life, over seasons change, natural environment and light, and weather conditions.

Nikolai Astrup (1880–1928) grew up in Jølster Municipality in the west of Norway. After studying art in Oslo and spending some time in Paris and in Germany, he returned to Jølster where he specialised in painting expressionist landscapes with clear, strong colors. He is considered to be one of the greatest Norwegian artists from the early 20th century.

Lars Hertervig (1830–1902) from Tysvær Municipality in south-western Norway painted semi-fantastical works inspired by the coastal landscape in Ryfylke. Hertervig completed a number of works on paper using aquarelles and often making the paper base himself from scrapes of discarded pieces of paper. The art museum under the main museum, Stavanger Museum, in Stavanger, Rogaland (previously Rogaland Museum of Fine Art) has the most significant collection of works by Hertervig in Norway.

Harald Sohlberg, (1869–1935), a neo-romanticist, is remembered for his paintings of Røros, and the Norwegian "national painting" Winter's Night in Rondane.

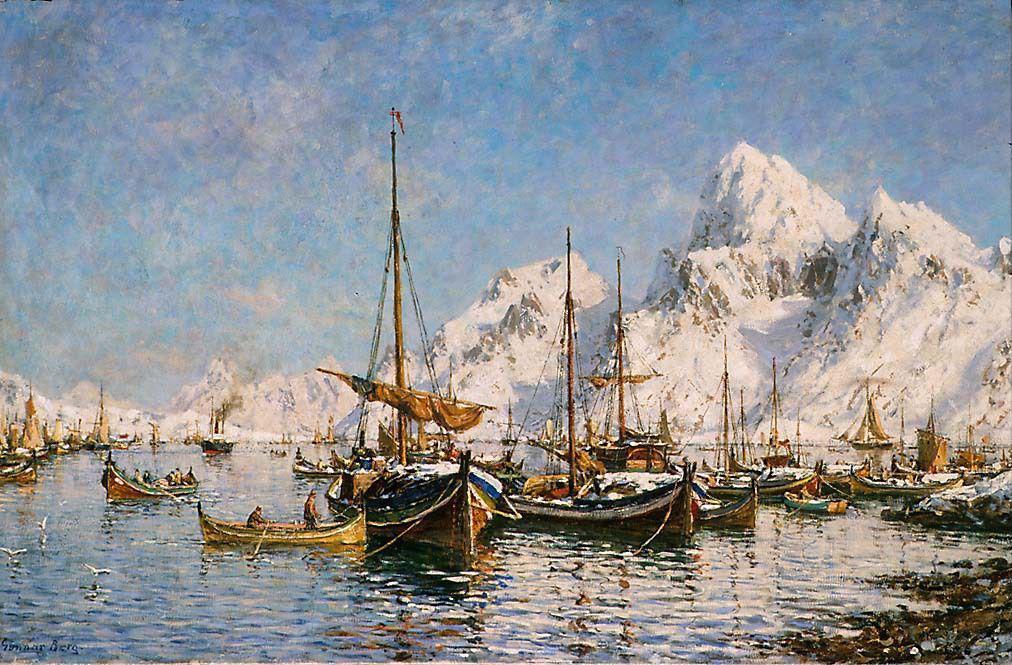
Gunnar Berg's From Vaterfjord, between 1886 and 1893. Being one of "the young dead", Berg is considered one of the finest painters of northern Norwegian nature.

== Edvard Munch ==
Norway's most famous artist is certainly Edvard Munch (1863–1944), a symbolist/expressionist who became world-famous for The Scream, one of the most recognizable paintings in all art. It has been widely interpreted as representing the universal anxiety of modern man.

== Other names ==
Other noteworthy 19th century painters are: August Cappelen, Peder Balke, Jacob Gløersen, Peter Nicolai Arbo, Eilif Peterssen, Gustav Wentzel, Oscar Wergeland, Erik Werenskiold, Asta Nørregaard, Amaldus Nielsen, Oda Krohg, Fritz Thaulow, Carl Sundt-Hansen, Christian Skredsvig, Gunnar Berg, Halfdan Egedius, Theodor Kittelsen, Harald Sohlberg.

Noteworthy artists from 20th century Norwegian art are: Harald Sohlberg, Reidar Aulie, Per Krohg, Arne Ekeland, Kai Fjell, Jacob Weidemann, Håkon Bleken, Jens Johannessen, Ludvig Karsten, Henrik Sørensen, Kjartan Slettemark, Anna-Eva Bergman, Anders Kjær, Svein Johansen, Svein Bolling, Bjørn Carlsen, Bjørn Ransve, Kåre Tveter, Frans Widerberg, Odd Nerdrum, Ida Lorentzen, Knut Rose, Ørnulf Opdahl, Håvard Vikhagen, Leonard Rickhard, Håkon Gullvåg, Kira Wager, Halvard Storm, Lars Elling, Vibeke Barbel Slyngstad.

19th-century sculptors include Stephan Sinding, Gunnar Utsond, Brynjulf Bergslien and Mathias Skeibrok.

20th-century sculptors include Gustav Vigeland, Nils Aas, Arnold Haukeland, Bård Breivik, Anne Grimdalen, Kristofer Leirdal, Per Palle Storm, Nina Sundbye, Dyre Vaa and Wilhelm Rasmussen.

In textile art Hannah Ryggen (1894–1970) holds a unique position. Frida Hansen was an Art Nouveau textile artist.

== See also ==
- Rosemaling
