= Vibeke =

Vibeke is a Scandinavian female given name, and may refer to:

- Vibeke Bärbel Slyngstad (born 1968), Norwegian painter
- Vibeke Falk (1918–2011), Norwegian actress.
- Hanne-Vibeke Holst (born 1959), Danish author
- Vibeke Hammer Madsen (born 1955), Norwegian businessperson
- Vibeke Hastrup (born 1958), Danish actress who has worked in theatre, television and film
- Vibeke Jensdatter (1638–1709), Danish merchant and landowner
- Vibeke Johansen (born 1978), Olympic and National Record holding swimmer from Norway
- Vibeke Johnsen (born 1968), Norwegian team handball player and Olympic medalist
- Vibeke Karlsen (born 1967), Norwegian football referee
- Vibeke Kruse (died 1648), official mistress of King Christian IV of Denmark between 1629 and 1648
- Vibeke Løkkeberg (born 1945), Norwegian film actress and director
- Vibeke Lunde (1921–1962), Norwegian sailor and Olympic medalist
- Vibeke Møller (1904–1987), Danish freestyle swimmer who competed in the 1924 Summer Olympics
- Vibeke Olsson (born 1958), Swedish author and pastor
- Vibeke Roggen (born 1952), Norwegian philologist and translator
- Vibeke Skofterud (1980–2018), Norwegian cross country skier who had been competing since 1999
- Vibeke Sperling, (1945–2017), Danish journalist
- Vibeke Stene (born 1978), Norwegian soprano singer
- Vibeke Storm Rasmussen (born 1945), Danish politician and the current chairman of the Capital Region of Denmark, elected for the Social Democrats
- Vibeke Vasbo (born 1944), Danish writer and women's rights and LGBT rights activist
- Vibeke Windeløv (born 1950), Danish film producer

== See also ==
- 2414 Vibeke, a main belt asteroid with an orbital period of 2090
