= Olaf Lange =

Norwegian painter and print maker

Olaf Helliesen Lange (11 February 1875 – 19 April 1965) was a Norwegian painter and print maker. Lange's fin-de-siècle art has its own special approach visualizing the complexity of the modern urban life.

Olaf Lange is best known for his symbolistic paintings and the multicolored aquatint etchings he made between 1903 and 1912, which are closely linked to the continental Art Nouveau style. The unique qualities of Lange's fin de siècle art are appreciated internationally. Among other prizes, Lange received a gold medal for graphics at the XI International Exhibition in Munich in 1913 and a Medal of Honor at the Panama–Pacific International Exposition in San Francisco in 1915.

== Early life ==
Olaf Lange was born in Stavanger, Norway in 1875, the son of Emil Lange (1821–1904), a doctor, and Marie Helliesen (1840–1916). The Art Nouveau textile artist Frida Hansen was his cousin and among his relatives were the painter Kitty Lange Kielland and the author Alexander Lange Kielland.

Lange started drawing and painting early in life, and among his teachers were both his cousin Frida Hansen (1855–1931) and Kitty L. Kielland (1843–1914). His teenage paintings and writings reveal Lange's lifelong interest in literature, including the works of Shakespeare and Goethe.

Lange studied at the University of Kristiania (now University of Oslo) for two years (1895–1897) and during the same period he attended drawing classes at the Norwegian National Academy of Craft and Art Industry art school.

== Paris ==
Olaf Lange studied at the Académie Julian in Paris from 1897 until 1901, where teachers were Jules Lefebvre and Tony Robert-Fleury. Living close to Montmartre, Lange experienced the fin-de-siècle modern life in Paris. He visited Normandy and Brittany to paint landscapes and the local people. His paintings from this period show an affinity to naturalism and social realism. Lange's painting Tète d'infant was exhibited in the Paris Salon in 1901.

== Munich – colour intaglio etchings ==
After leaving Paris, Lange lived in Norway for two years, mostly in Kristiania (now Oslo). He made his debut at the Høstutstillingen in 1905.

In 1903 he moved to Munich, spending his first two years in the Schwabing area of the city. During this period he made his first multicolored intaglio etchings. His nine etching motifs were made between in the period 1903 to 1912. Lange drew his inspiration from Arnold Böcklin, Frida Hansen, Gustav Klimt and Franz von Stuck, and from Italian frescoes and Japanese art. He also found inspiration in literature, including the works of Gustave Flaubert, Anatole France and Goethe.

In 1905 Lange moved to Dachau and was based there until 1914, with a stay in Rome in 1909 and some trips back to Norway.

Stavanger Art Museum has a complete collection of Lange's colour etchings, comprising:

- Salammbô (1905)
- Herodias (1905)
- Women Impailed on Butterflies (1905)
- The Mermaid (1905)
- The Queen of Sheba (1906)
- Urvasi (1906)
- The Cry / Revolution (1908)
- The Martyr (1911)
- Tang / Seaweed (1912)

== The First World War and after ==
Lange moved to Copenhagen in 1914, at the beginning of the First World War, also spending time in Norway. Besides stops in Stavanger, he travelled to Ulvik, Hardanger and Sogn to paint mainly landscapes of the western fjords. During this period Lange also painted monumental tempera paintings, and a six meter long triptych called The 11,000 Virgins. Lange contracted tuberculosis and stayed in Copenhagen until the early 1920s.

Olaf Lange recovered from the illness after a stay in Baden-Baden, in the fresh air of the Black Forest. He then moved back to Munich and started writing articles for newspapers in Norway and Sweden, besides painting. In his articles in the Stavanger Aftenblad newspaper he wrote about the tense situation building up in Munich during the leading up to the Second World War. In 1936 Lange stayed in Brixen in northern Italy. In 1943 he was expelled from Germany and travelled to Norway where he spent the rest of his life. During the war he lived in Tau, moving back to his hometown Stavanger when the war ended in 1945. Around 1950 Lange lived for some time in Stord Municipality.

Olaf Lange left a great deal of his work to Stavanger Faste Galleri, now Stavanger Art Museum and to the British Museum

Olaf Lange died in Stavanger in 1965.

== Collections ==
Lange's art is represented in the collections of several museums, including in Rome, Venice, Munich, Vienna, Berlin, Leipzig, Dresden, Paris, Brighton, Chicago and San Francisco. In Norway his work is in the collections of the National Museum of Art, Architecture and Design, Oslo, and the art museums of Bergen and Stavanger.
