= Kukan (surname) =

Kukan is a surname with multiple origins. In Slovakia, it has a feminine form, Kukanová.

Notable people with the surname include:

- Dean Kukan (born 1993), Swiss ice hockey player
- Eduard Kukan (1939–2022), Slovak politician
- Géza Kukán (1890–1936), Hungarian painter
