= Wylde Swan =

Dutch schooner

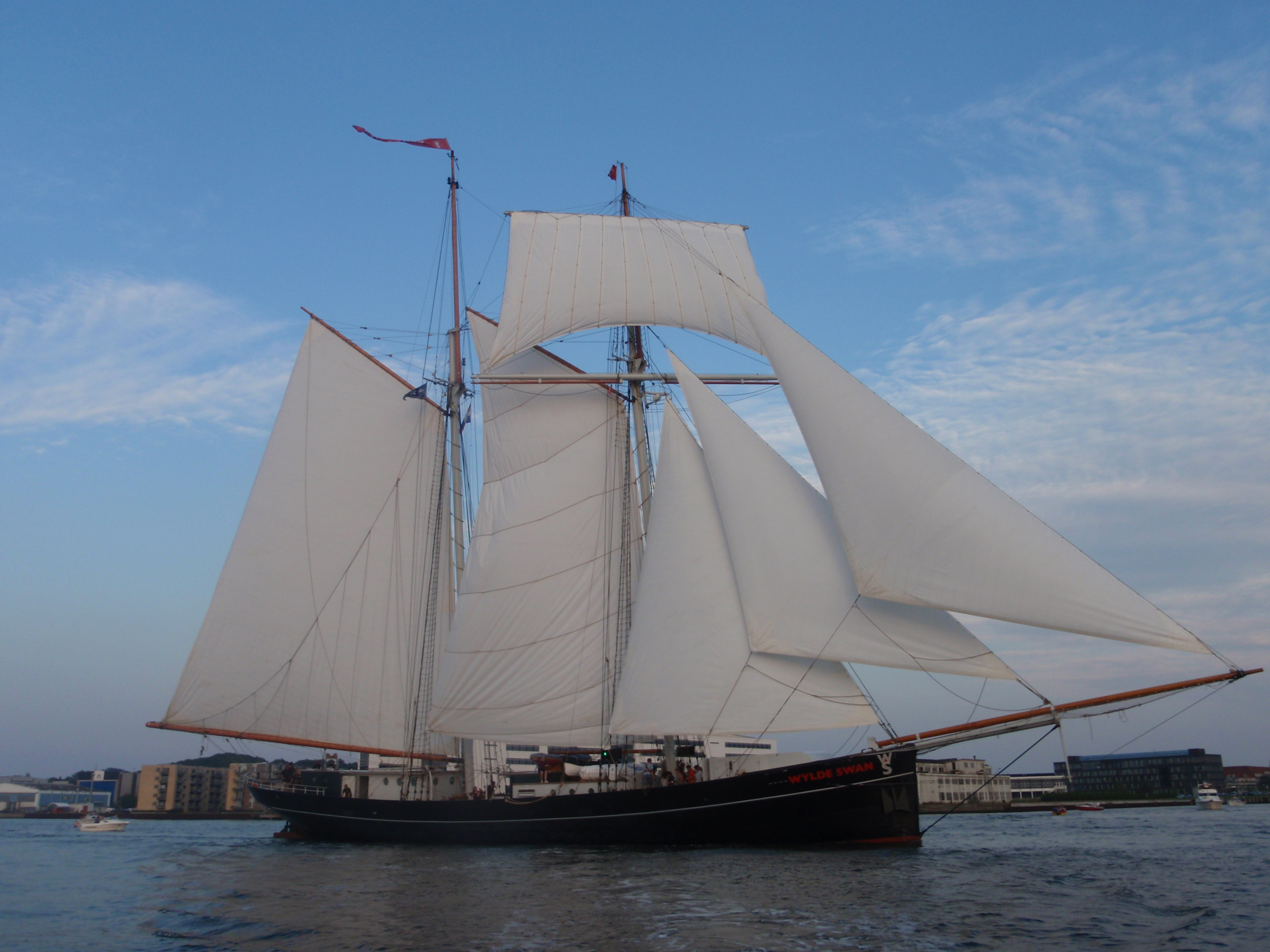
- Wylde Swan

History

Netherlands
- Name: Wylde Swan
- Port of registry: Dutch
- Laid down: 1920
- Launched: 2010
- Home port: Makkum
- Identification: IMO number: 5126718; MMSI number: 244074000; Callsign: PIWS

General characteristics
- Type: topsail Schooner
- Tonnage: 269 GT; 355 DWT
- Length: 63 m
- Beam: 7.5 m
- Height: 43 m
- Draught: 4 m
- Installed power: 480 HP
- Sail plan: 7 sails
- Speed: max 14 knots (26 km/h; 16 mph) sail
- Capacity: 120 day sail 36 trainees passages
- Crew: 12

Wylde Swan (West Frisian for "Wild Swan") is a fast sailing vessel originally built in Germany in 1920 as a steam ship. She was designed to work with the German herring fleet, collecting the herring at sea and transporting the fish to market at speed to get the best price. To maximise speed she was built long and narrow, and in keeping with her day had a vertical stem and counter stern.

These features were what attracted Willem Sligting when he saw her, realising she could make a fast sailing vessel.

She was relaunched in June 2010 as a two masted topsail schooner, with worldwide certification as a sail training vessel.

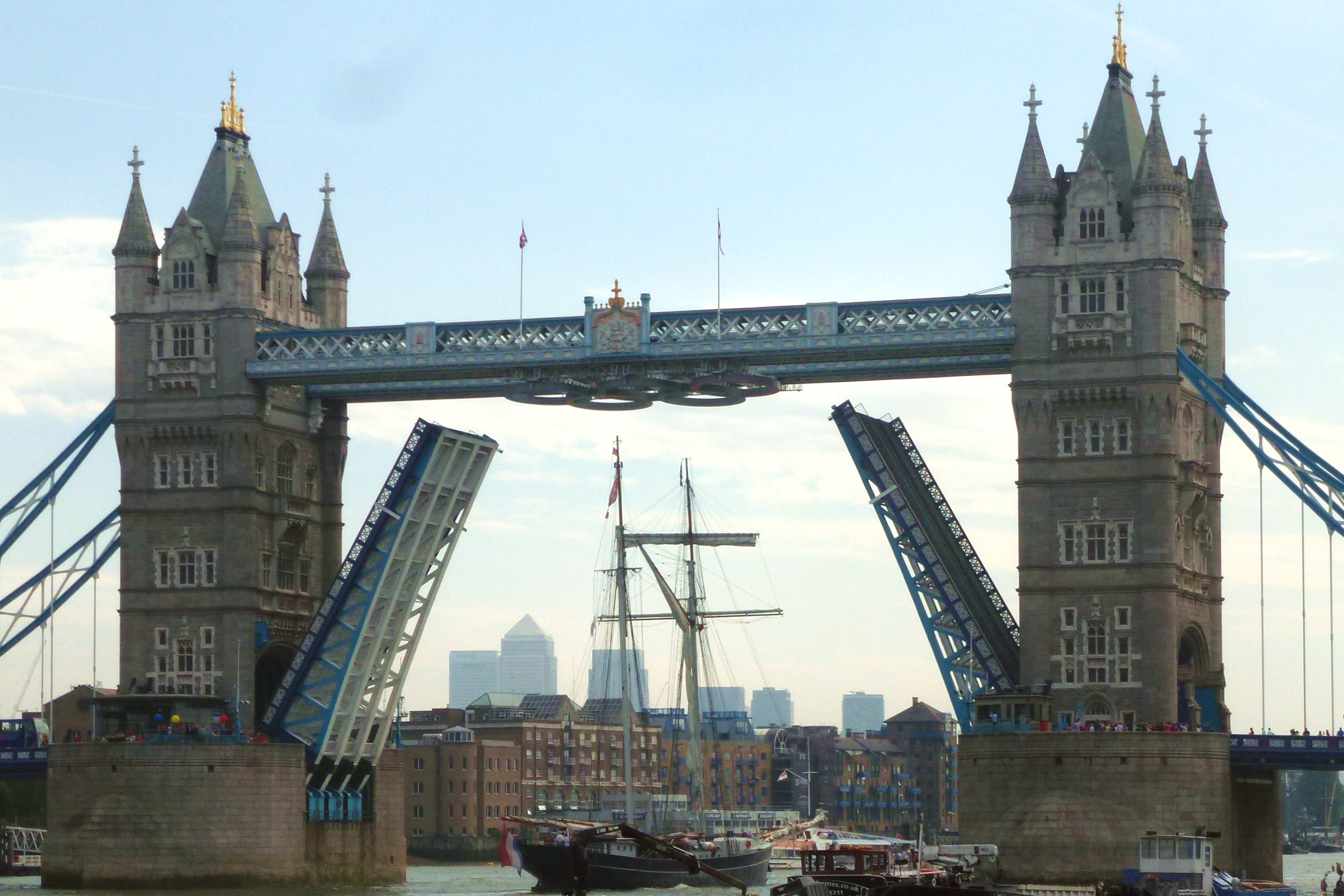
Wylde Swan passing under Tower Bridge decorated for the 2012 Summer Olympics in August 2012. Note the Olympic rings folded up to allow passage of the mast.

== Wyvern sinking ==
Wylde Swan was mentioned in connection of the sinking of Wyvern during the early hours of July 11, 2013. Both ships were participating in the Tall Ships' Race when Wyvern started taking on water. Wyvern alerted the Swedish coast guard at 05:21, stating that the ship was taking in water and in critical need of aid. The coastguard boats, with the aid of surrounding ships (including Wylde Swan), attempted to use bilge pumps to prevent sinking. When this was not successful, the crew members were evacuated, the last being removed by helicopter at 08:00. At 09:22, the coast guard received a report that 3 crewmembers from Wylde Swan had boarded Wyvern, attempting to rescue the sinking ship. At 09:37, the ship finally sank, leaving two of Wylde Swan crew members in the water and a third missing. The two crew members were taken to hospital by helicopter. Reports suggest that the third man was caught in the rigging and drowned. The weather at the time was harsh with waves between 3 and 4 metres and a stiff gale of 15 m/s. The body was recovered by Swedish Coast Guard a few days later.
