= Jacob Gløersen =

Norwegian painter

- Born: 1852; Nissedal, Telemark, Norway
- Died: 1912 (aged 59–60)
- Occupation: Painter

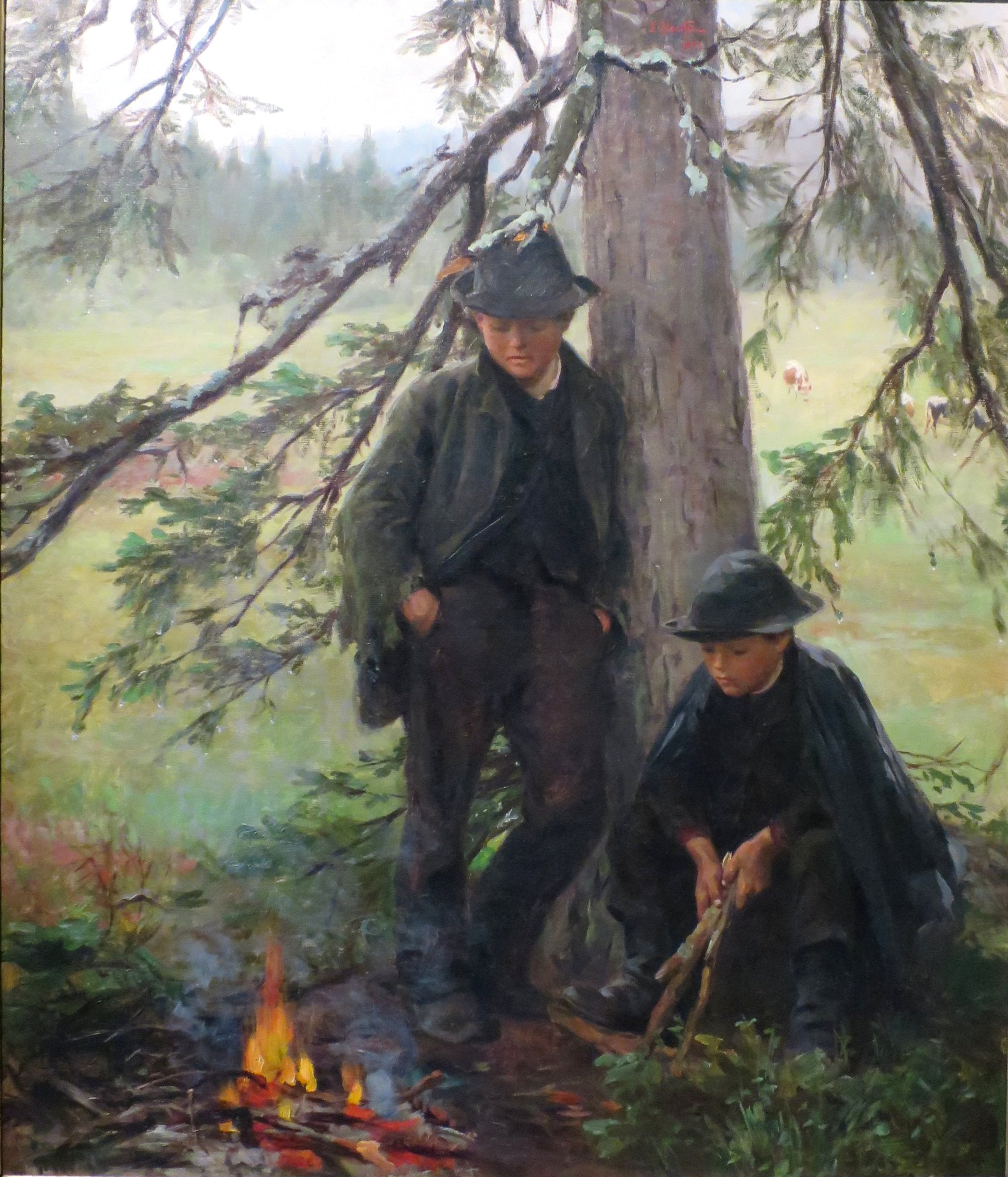
Shepherd Boys by Jacob Gløersen, 1893, oil on canvas, Bergen Kunstmuseum

Jacob Gløersen (28 May 1852–21 August 1912) was a Norwegian painter.

== Biography ==
Gløersen was born at Nissedal Municipality in Telemark, Norway. He was the son of parish priest Johan Gløersen (1810-1890) and Charlotte Cecilie Dahl (1812-1892). He took matriculation at Kristiansand Cathedral School in 1872. He studied with Olaf Isaachsen in Kristiansand in 1872, at Knud Bergslien's painting school from 1872 to 1875, and with Otto Seitz in Munich in 1880. In 1881, he debuted at the Christiania Art Society. He was awarded a Silver Medal at Paris in 1889 and a Gold Medal at Munich in 1891. He traveled on an endowment to Copenhagen, Amsterdam, Antwerp and Paris during 1893. He was awarded the St. Olav's Medal in 1910.

His art often reflected an unsentimental image of the Norwegian peasant environment in Numedal, Valdres, Hadeland, and Lillehammer. He is represented at the National Gallery of Norway with several paintings, including På rugdepost from 1887 and Vinterdag from 1900.

== Selected works ==
- Liden Læselyst (1883)
- Doktorbesøg (1885)
- Snefog (1890)
- Kveld (1892)
- Vinter (1894)
- Kulmile (1896)
