= Gamle Stavanger =

Area of Stavanger, Norway

Coordinates: 58°58′22″N 5°43′31″E

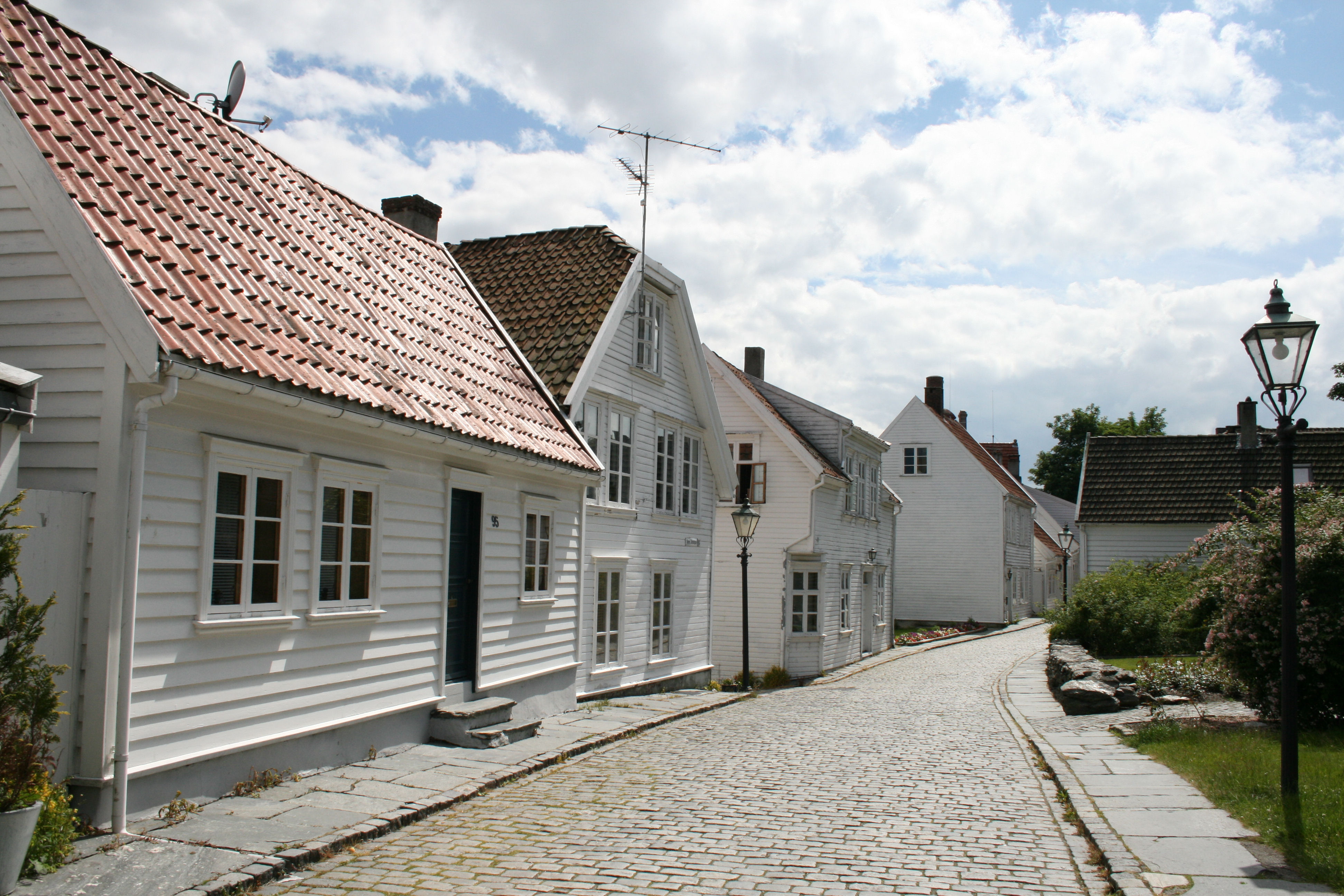
Gamle Stavanger street view

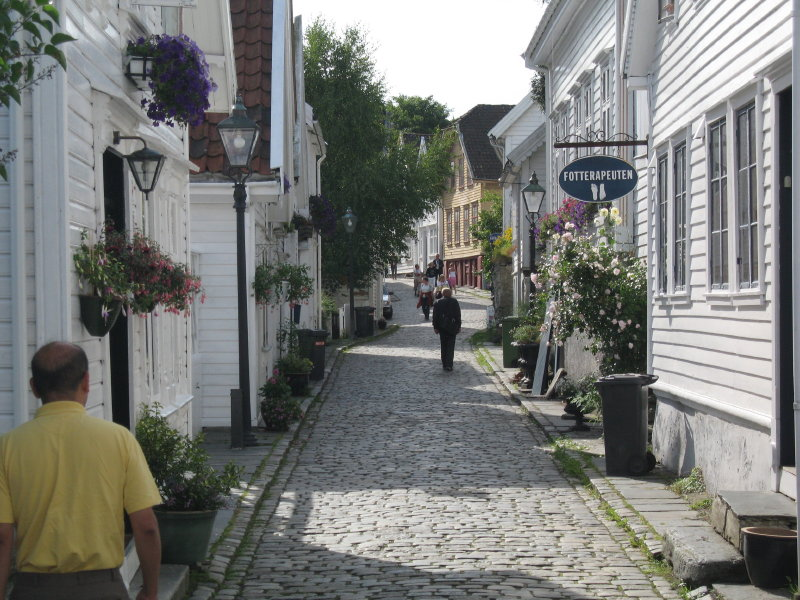
Øvre Strandgate in Gamle Stavanger

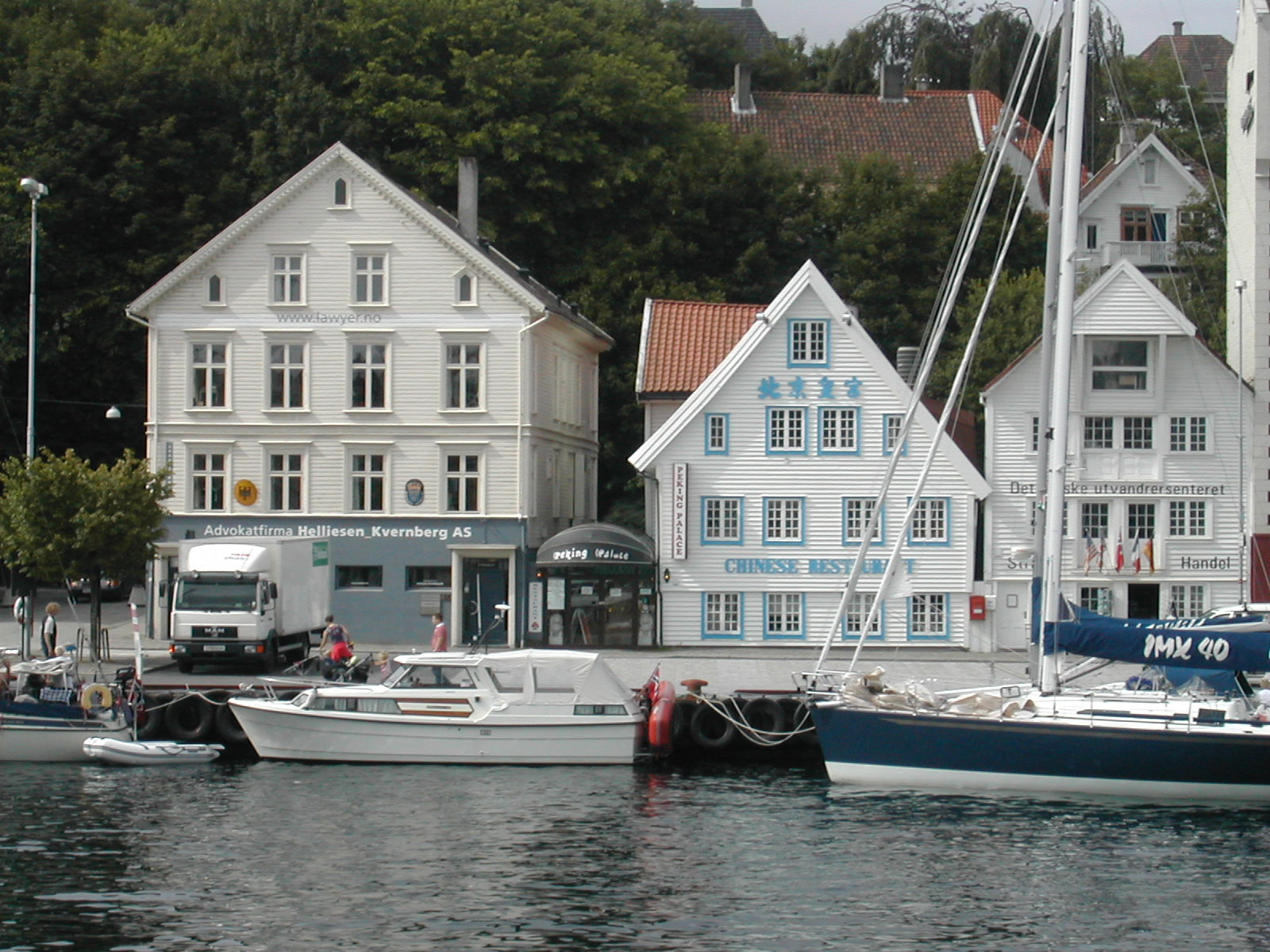
Lower parts of Gamle Stavanger seen from Vågen

Gamle Stavanger is a historic area of the city of Stavanger which is located in Stavanger Municipality in Rogaland county, Norway. The area consists largely of restored wooden buildings which were built in the 18th century and at the beginning of the 19th century.

In the aftermath of World War II, a new city plan was created for Stavanger. It included razing most of the old wooden buildings in the city centre and replacing them with new modern structures in concrete. One single voice spoke up against this plan, and today it is recognized that Gamle Stavanger owes its existence to Einar Hedén (1916-2001), then City Architect of Stavanger. In 1956 the municipal council of Stavanger Municipality voted to conserve part of the old city centre.

The area selected for conservation was the one considered the least desirable, consisting of small rundown wooden buildings located on the western side of Vågen, the inner harbor area of Stavanger. This area has a selection of preserved wood houses dating from both the 19th and 20th century. Some of the houses are owned by the municipality, but most are privately owned. Over the years the area has changed from seedy to trendy, and today is considered a choice location for the urban-minded with a sense of history. Gamle Stavanger has grown such that it now covers more than 250 buildings most of which are small, white wooden cottages. The area also includes the Norwegian Canning Museum which displays a typical factory from the 1920s.

Stavanger Municipality has received several awards for the preservation of Gamle Stavanger. During the Council of Europe's 1975 European Architectural Year, Gamle Stavanger, together with the historic fishing village of Nusfjord in Nordland and the former mining town of Røros in Sør-Trøndelag, were identified as examples of how conservation of old buildings may well coincide with use, and how rehabilitation can be done without loss of character.

== Other sources ==
- Næss, Hans Eyvind (1998) Gamle Stavanger (Foreningen gamle Stavanger) ISBN 8299365228
