= Wyvern (1897 vessel) =

Sailing ship operated by Stavanger Maritime Museum

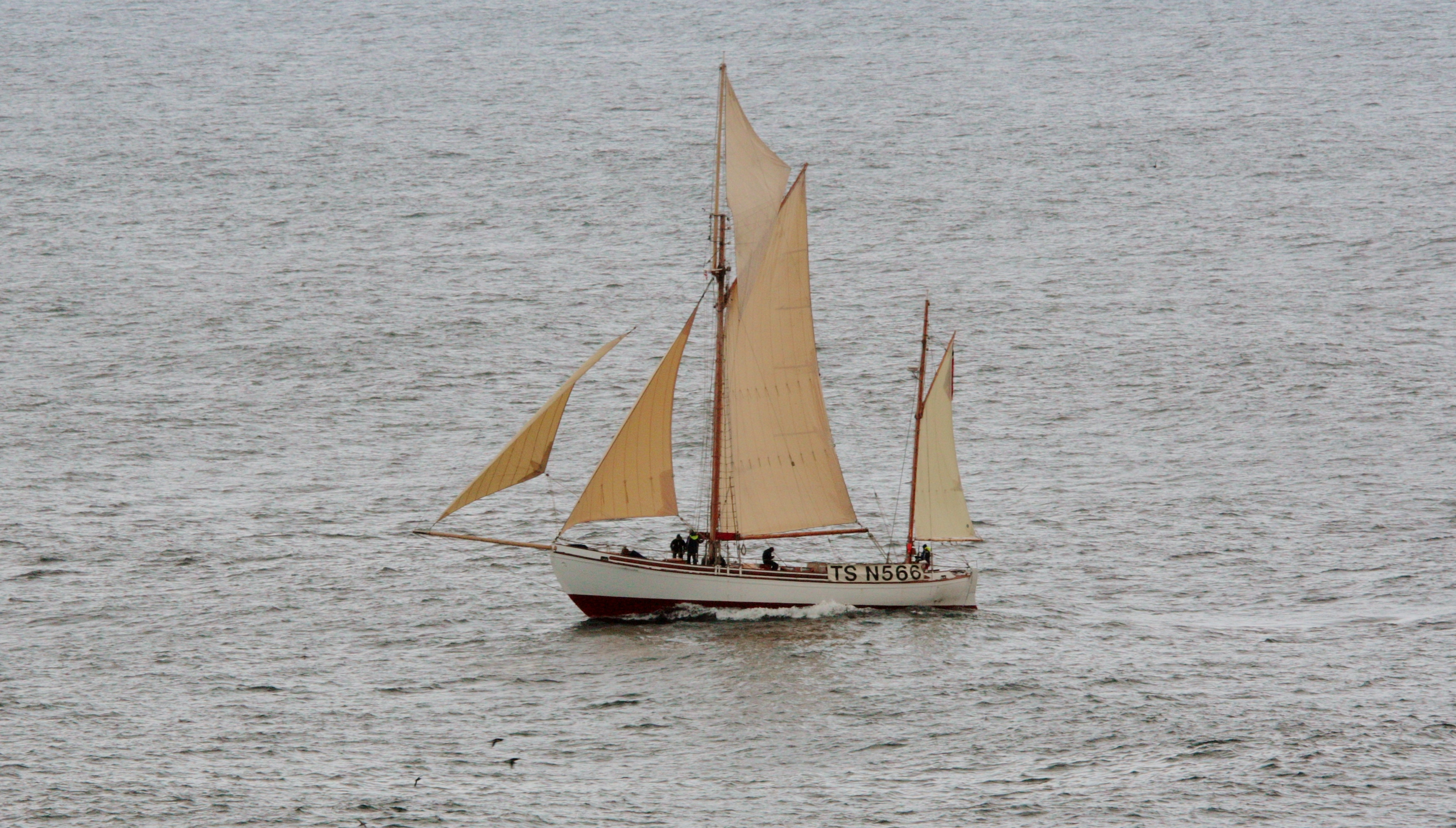
- Wyvern in Shetland in 2015

History
- Name: Wyvern (1897–1909); Tatjana (1909–1924); Havfruen III (1924–1970); Wyvern (since 1970)
- Namesake: The heraldic beast Wyvern
- Port of registry: Larvik, Norway (1897–1909); (German Empire) Kiel, Germany (1909–1924); Norway (1924–1934); United Kingdom (1934–1978); (Norway) Stavanger (since 1978)
- Builder: Porsgrund Baatbyggeri
- Launched: 10 August 1897
- Identification: MMSI number: 257563910; Callsign: LKSI

General characteristics
- Class & type: Yacht
- Tonnage: 42.8 GRT; 15.8 NRT
- Length: 18.2 metres (59 ft 9 in)
- Beam: 5.4 metres (17 ft 9 in)
- Height: Main mast 24 metres (78 ft 9 in)
- Depth: 3.25 metres (10 ft 8 in)
- Propulsion: Sails (253 square metres (2,720 sq ft)), auxiliary diesel engine
- Sail plan: Yacht
- Complement: 10

Wyvern is a 60-foot (18 m) open sea sailing ship operated by Stavanger Maritime Museum. The ship was designed by Colin Archer on a commission from British-born Frederick Croft and was launched on 10 August 1897. She sailed under the German flag from 1909. The Norwegian newspaper editor Rolf Thommessen bought her in 1924 and renamed her Havfruen III (Mermaid III). This name was kept by the English owners, Anne and Terrence Carr, who acquired her in 1947 and sold her to Christian-Frederick Mattner in 1970, who renamed her to the original name "Wyvern".

In 1984, Wyvern was donated to the Stavanger Maritime Museum by local companies which had paid for her restoration. She sank in the Baltic Sea on 11 July 2013 during the 2013 Tall Ships' Races. The crew were rescued, but a member of a rescue team died during the accident. She was raised from the sea in August 2013 and returned to Stavanger. In December 2013, her repairs began at a Denmark shipyard.

== Description ==
The vessel is 18.2 metres (59 ft 9 in) long, with a beam of 5.4 metres (17 ft 9 in) and a depth of 3.25 metres (10 ft 8 in). Her main mast is 24 metres (78 ft 9 in). The vessel carries 253 square metres (2,720 sq ft) of sail and has a 170 horsepower (130 kW) Volvo Penta diesel engine as auxiliary power. She is assessed as 42.8 GRT, 15.8 NRT.

== History ==
Frederick Croft, a timber merchant who was born in Hull, United Kingdom but lived in Skien, Norway, commissioned the vessel in 1894 from Colin Archer, a ship designer and ship builder who also built Fram for the explorer Fridtjov Nansen. The construction took place at the shipbuilding yard Porsgrund Baatbyggeri which was headed by Thor Martin Jensen. Named after the heraldic beast wyvern, the vessel was launched in 1897. Croft used her among other things to sail to his hometown Hull.

She sailed, from 1909, under the German flag and the name Tatjana, but later returned to Norway. Newspaper editor Rolf Thommessen bought her in 1924 and renamed her Havfruen III (Mermaid III). This name was kept when she was sold in 1934 to the English couple Anne and Terrence Carr. They sailed her for 27 years. The Carrs crossed the Atlantic twelve times and in the 1950s sailed around the world in the vessel.

In 1970 she was acquired by Christian-Frederick Mattner and renamed back to "Wyvern". In 1973 and 1974 'Wyvern' was extensively restored in a Spanish Shipyard and was registered in Panama.

After an initiative by the Norwegian Maritime Museum, she was brought back to Norway for restoration by companies in the oil industry in Rogaland in 1978. In 1984, she was given to Stavanger Maritime Museum as a cultural monument by Crown Prince Haakon. Sailed by volunteers, she has represented Stavanger in several national and international sailing regattas and gatherings, including five Tall Ship races.

== Shipwreck and salvage ==
On 11 July 2013, during the 2013 Tall Ships' Race, Wyvern started to take in water between the Swedish islands Gotland and Öland. Sweden’s air and sea rescue service retrieved the ten crew members; Wyvern sank about four hours after she had sent her distress call.

Three crew members from the Dutch sailship Wylde Swan, which also participated in the Tall Ships' race, went onboard Wyvern shortly before she sank in an attempt to rescue the vessel by pumping out water. Two of the crew were later rescued, but a third crew member went down with the ship. He was found in the sea on 14 July 2013.

Wyvern lay about 50 metres (160 ft) under water after the foundering and various oil companies donated money to salvage her. Salvagers raised her from the Baltic Sea on 11 August 2013 and brought her to Stavanger on board the ship Island Constructor. She arrived in Stavanger on 15 August 2013. The cause of the foundering was found to be fractures in three keel bolts.

In December 2013, Wyvern sailed to Denmark for repairs at a shipyard.
