= Géza Kukán =

Hungarian painter (1890–1936)

Géza Kukán (1890–1936) was a Hungarian painter.

== Life ==
Géza Kukán was born in Érsekújvár (then called Neuhäusel) on 1 May 1890. He studied at the Academy of Fine Arts in Budapest under Ede Balló and Károly Ferenczy from 1908; travelled to Munich in 1910 and studied under Otto Seitz and Carl von Marr until 1911; and continued his training in Nagybánya, Paris, and finally at Gyula Benczúr's school in Budapest.

Kukán painted, in a naturalistic style, mainly figure paintings, genre scenes, and religious subjects. He also worked in book illustration. Several of his works are kept by the Hungarian National Gallery. He died in Budapest on 28 January 1936.

== Gallery ==
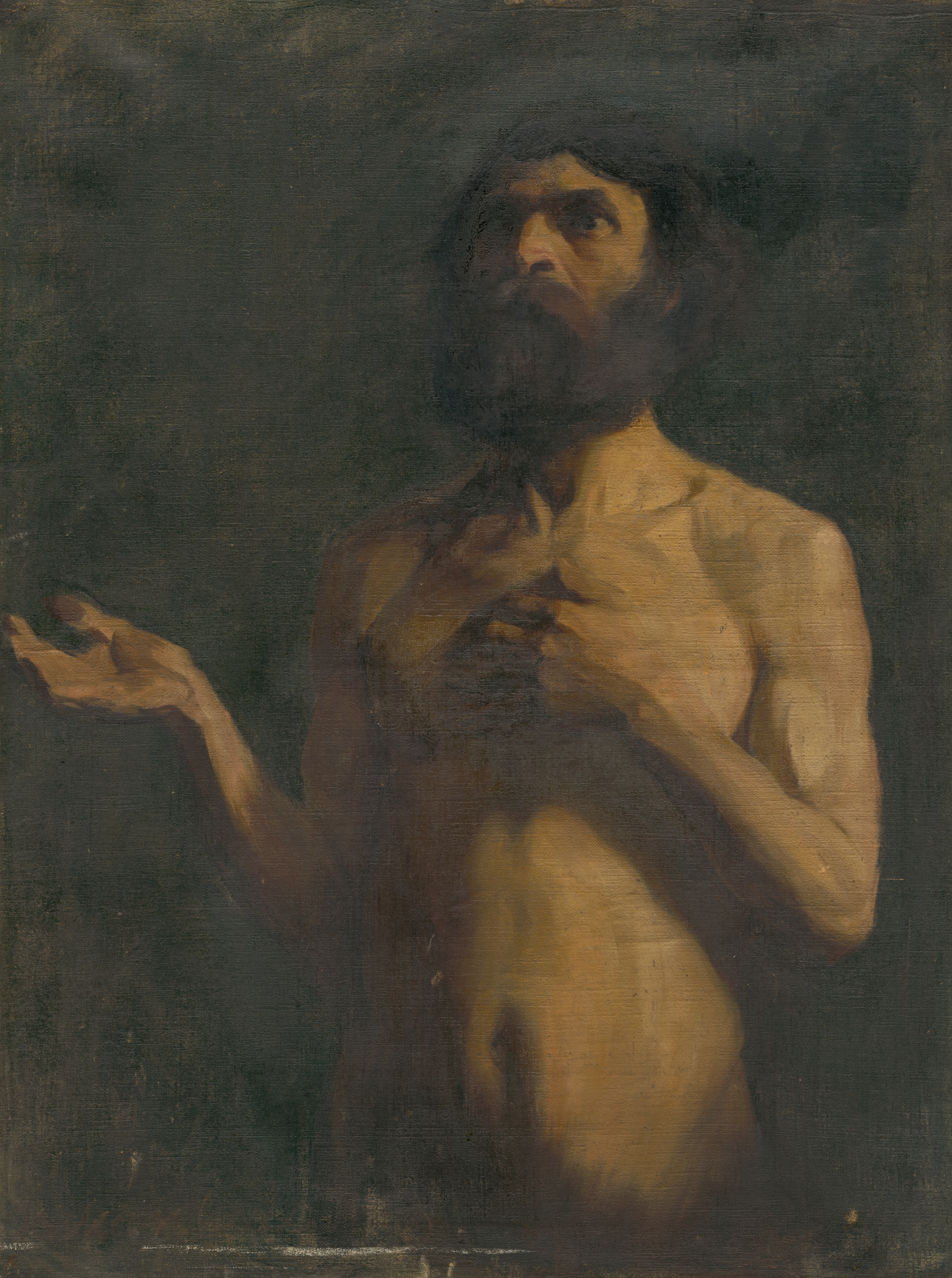
Štúdia aktu starého muža (1900)

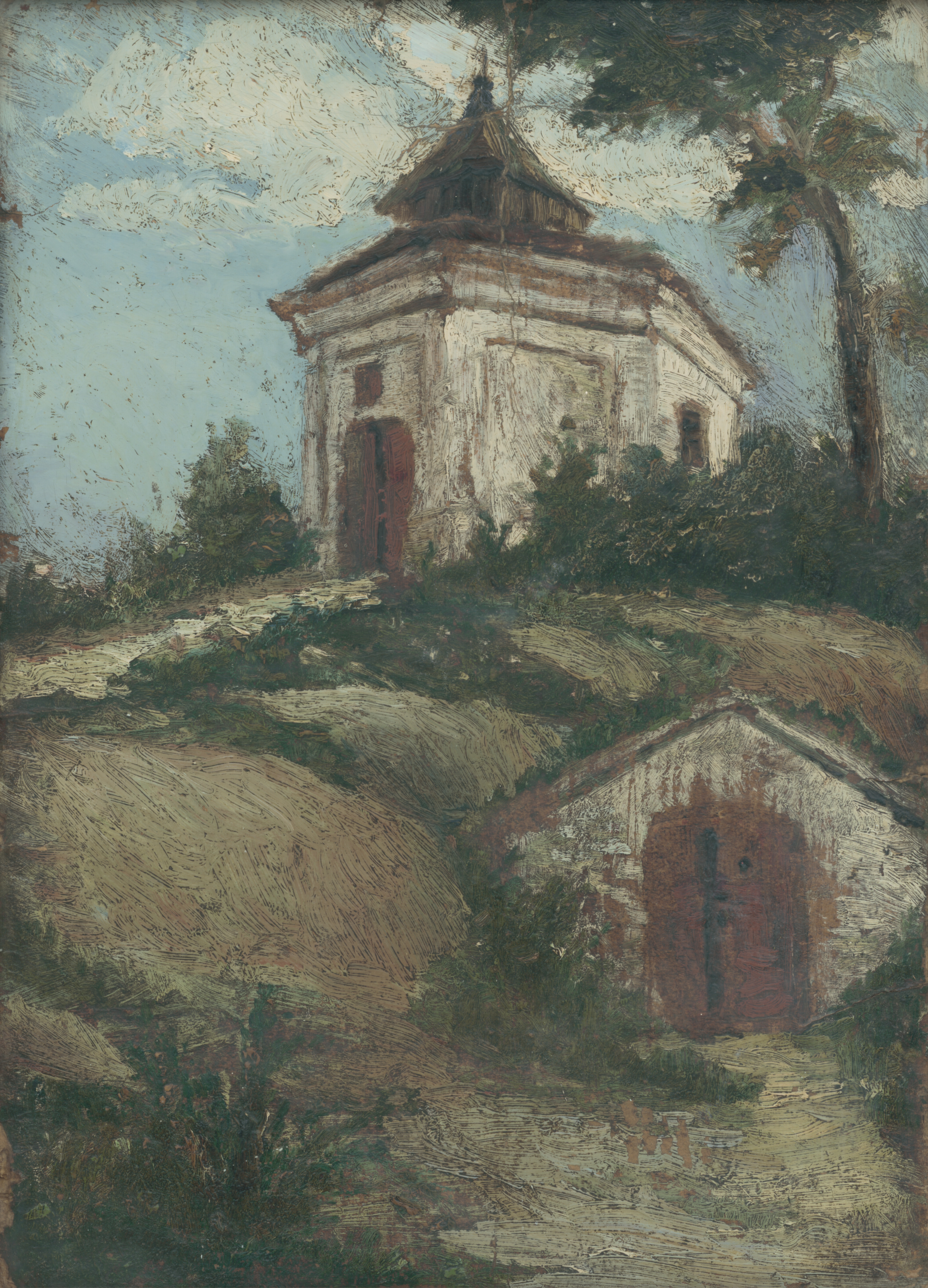
Novozámocká kalvária (1908)

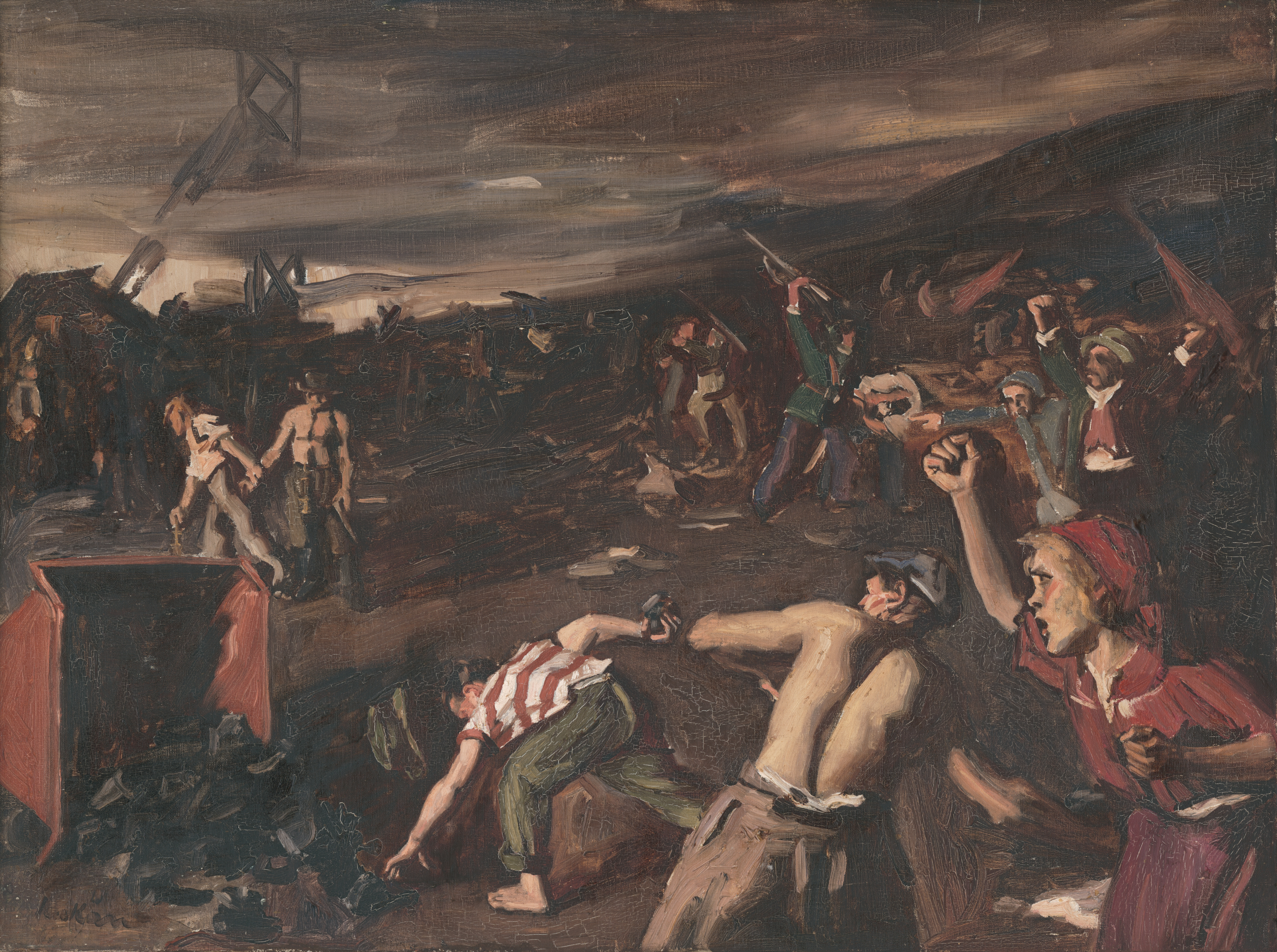
Banícky štrajk (1920)

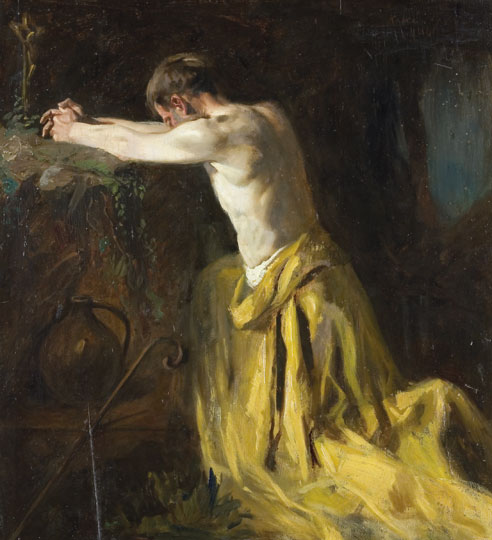
The Hermit (1921)

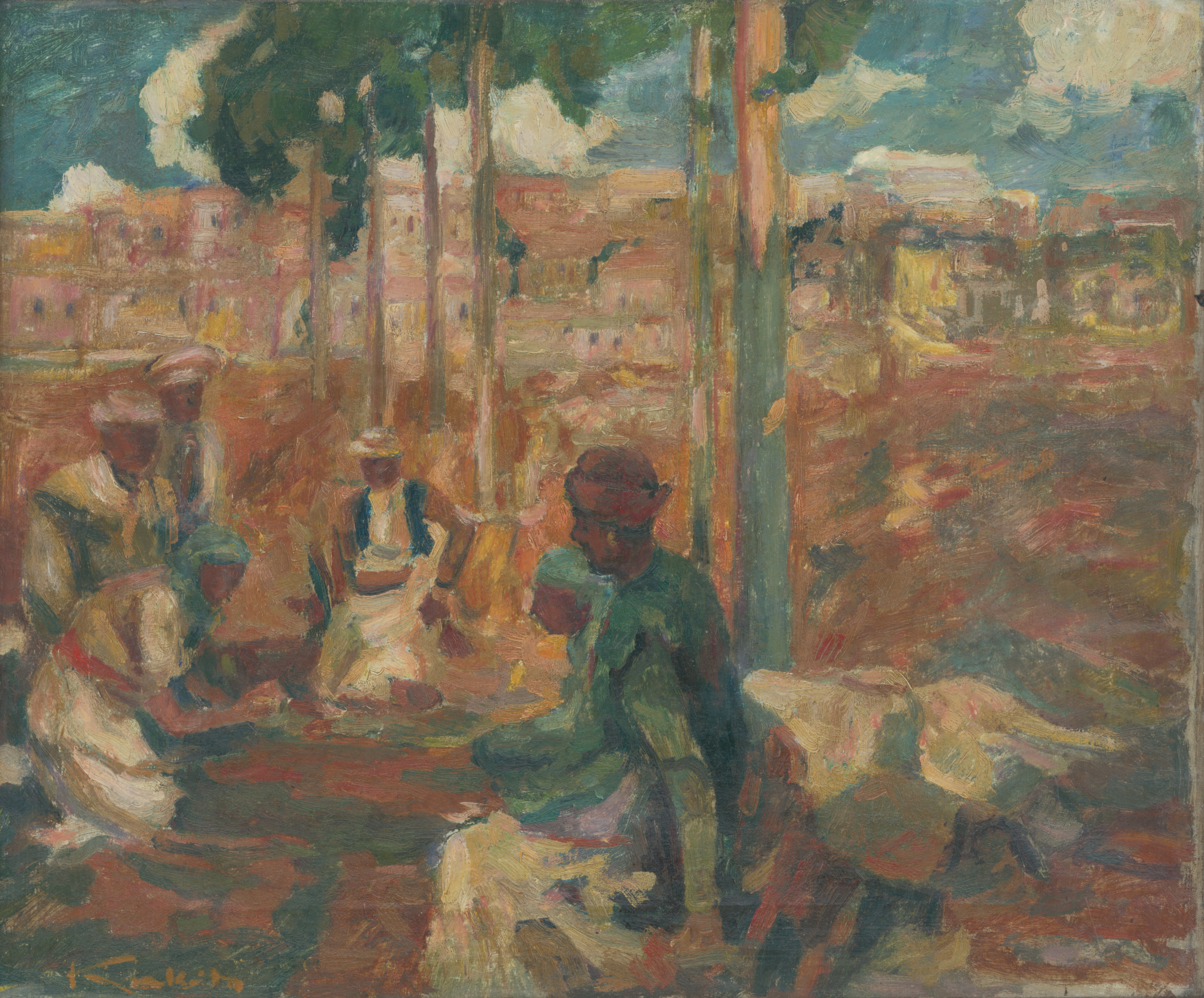
Dalmácky trh (1925)

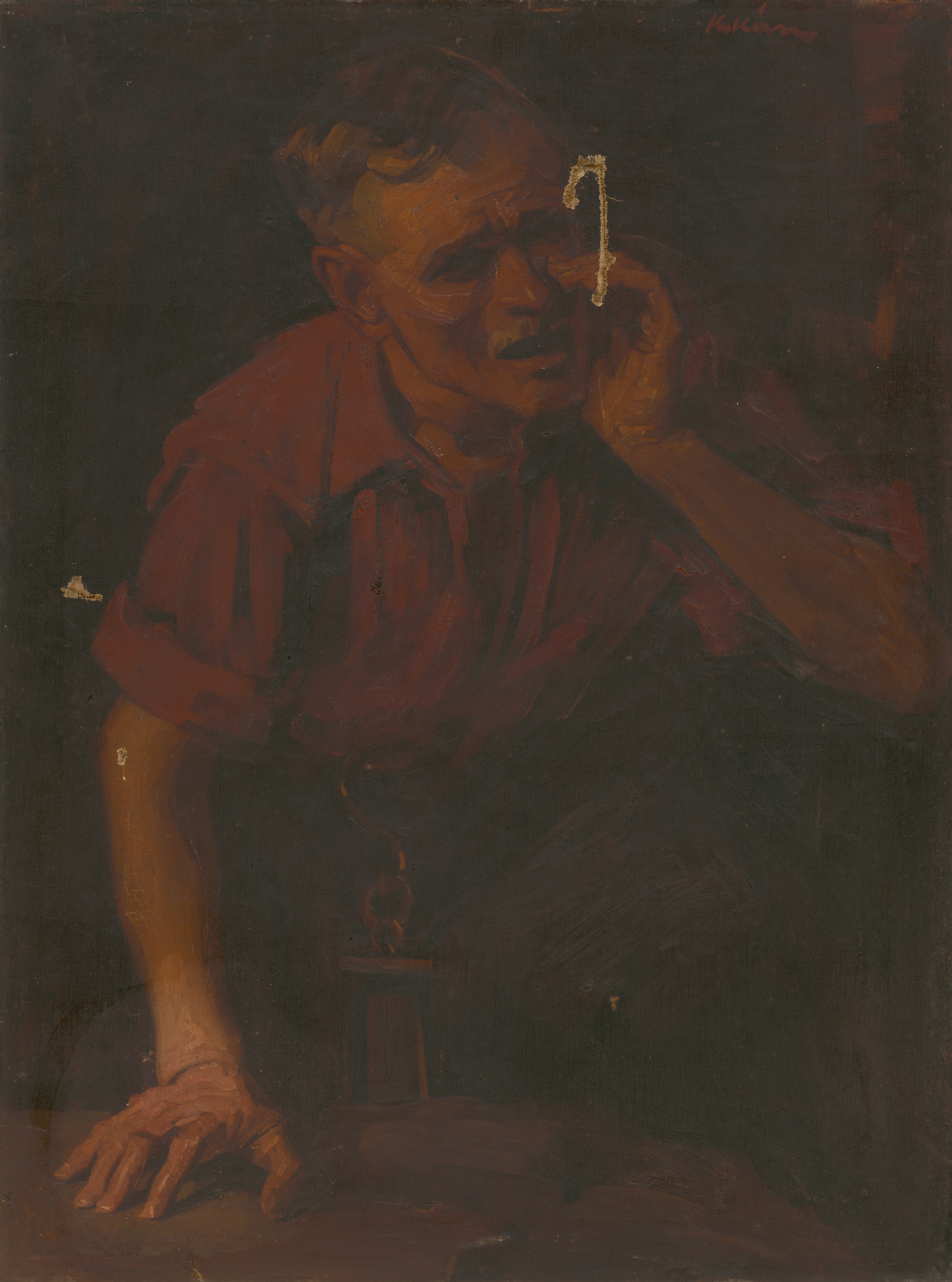
Baník

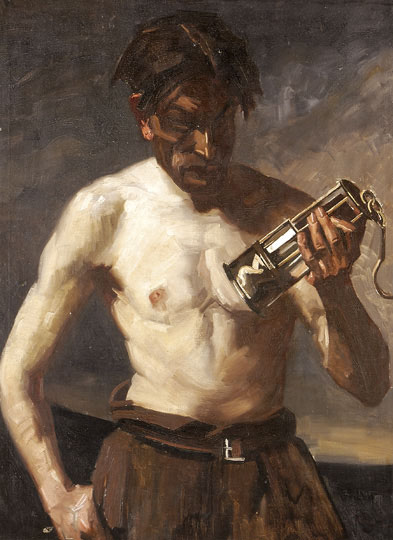
Miner with Lamp

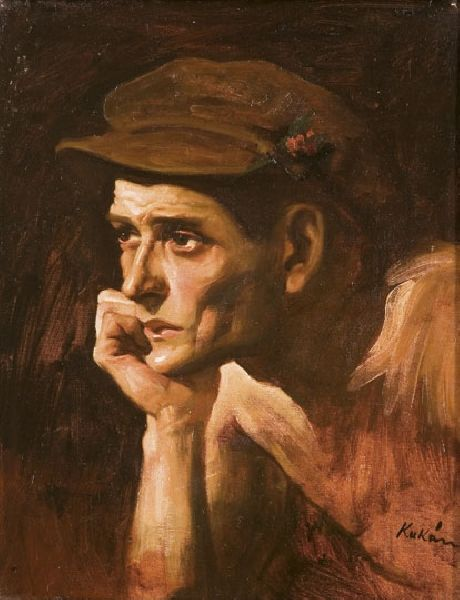
Man Wearing a Cap

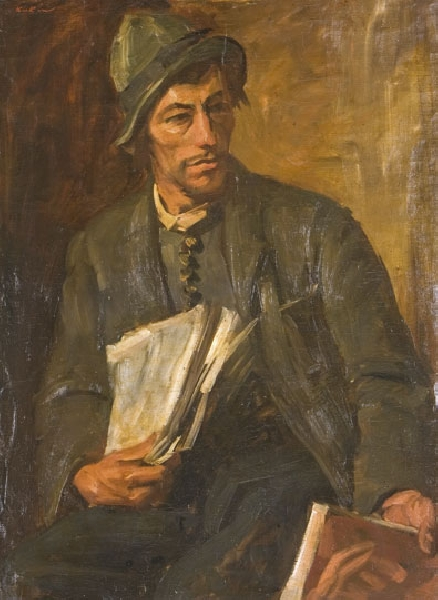
Kukán Bookseller

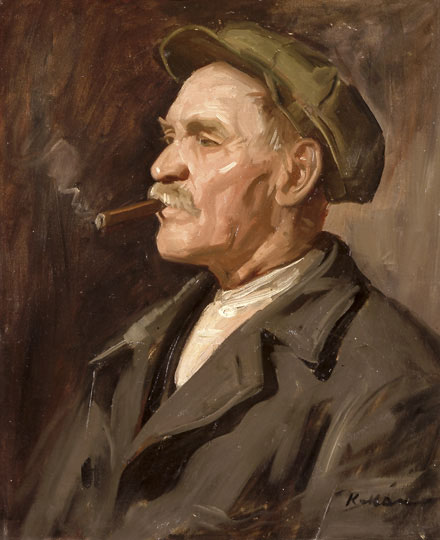
Portrait of a Man Smoking a Cigar

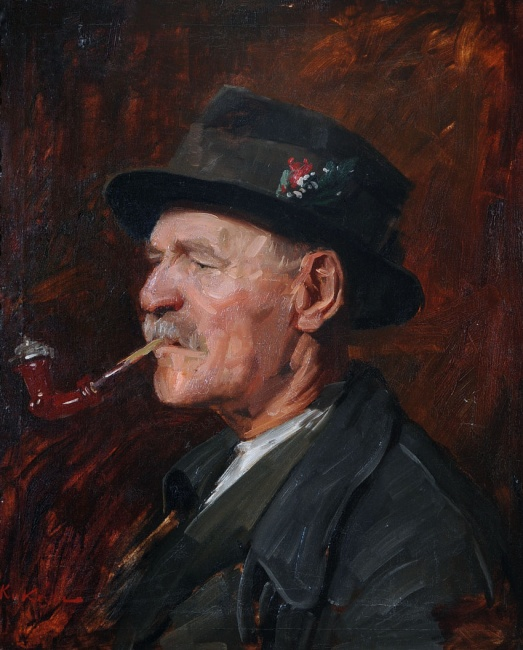
Piping Man

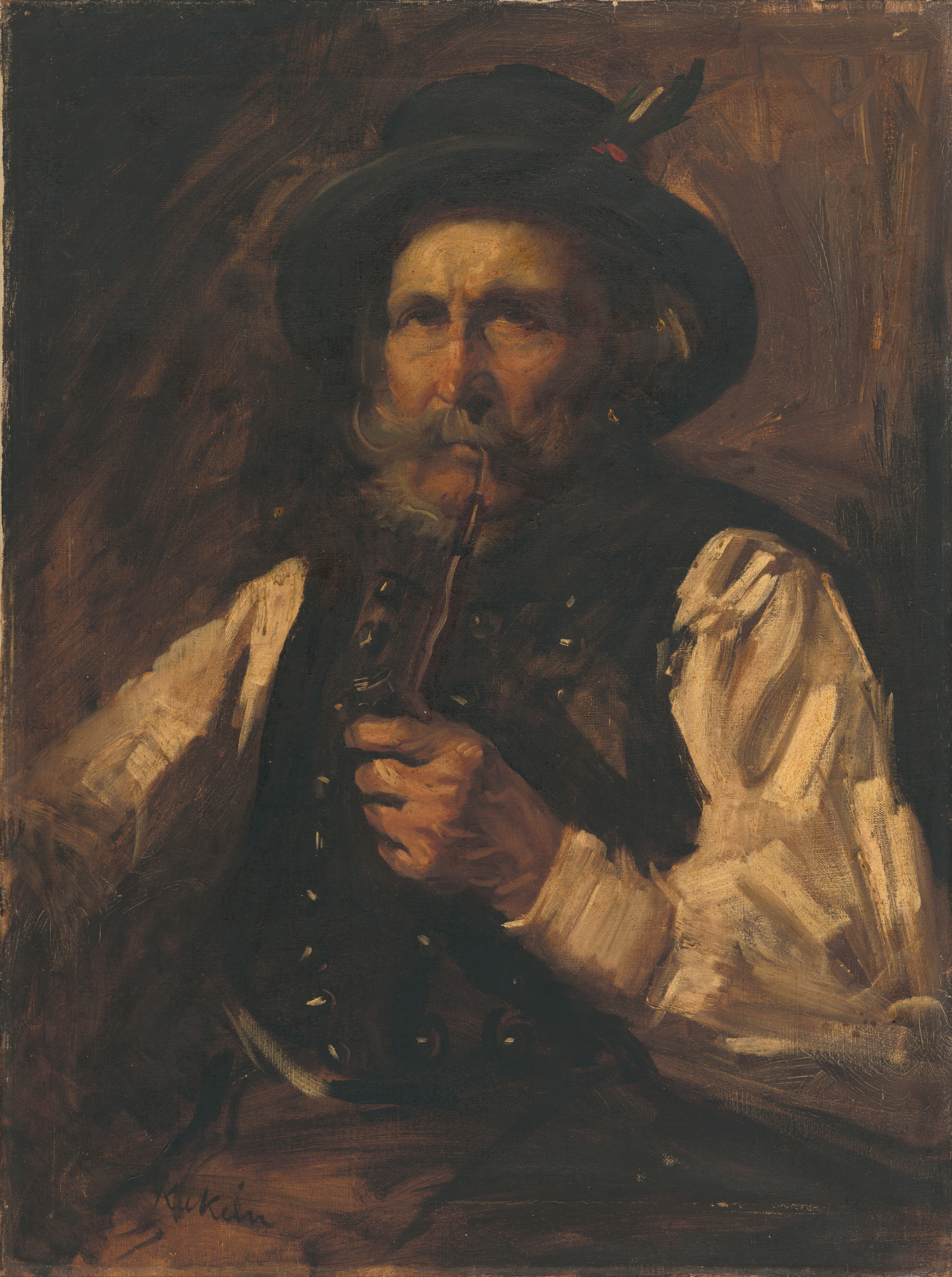
Portrét muža s fajkou (1925)

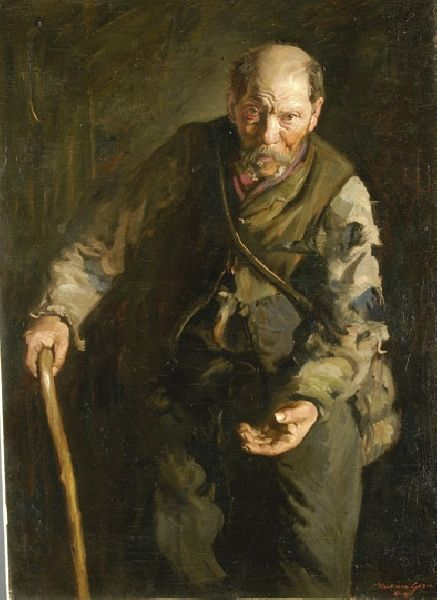
The Beggar

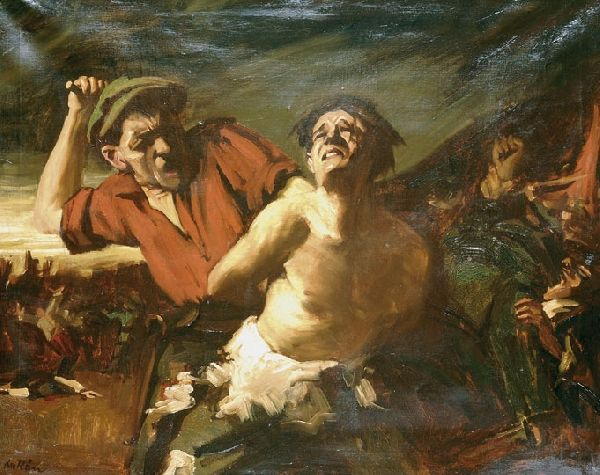
Barricade

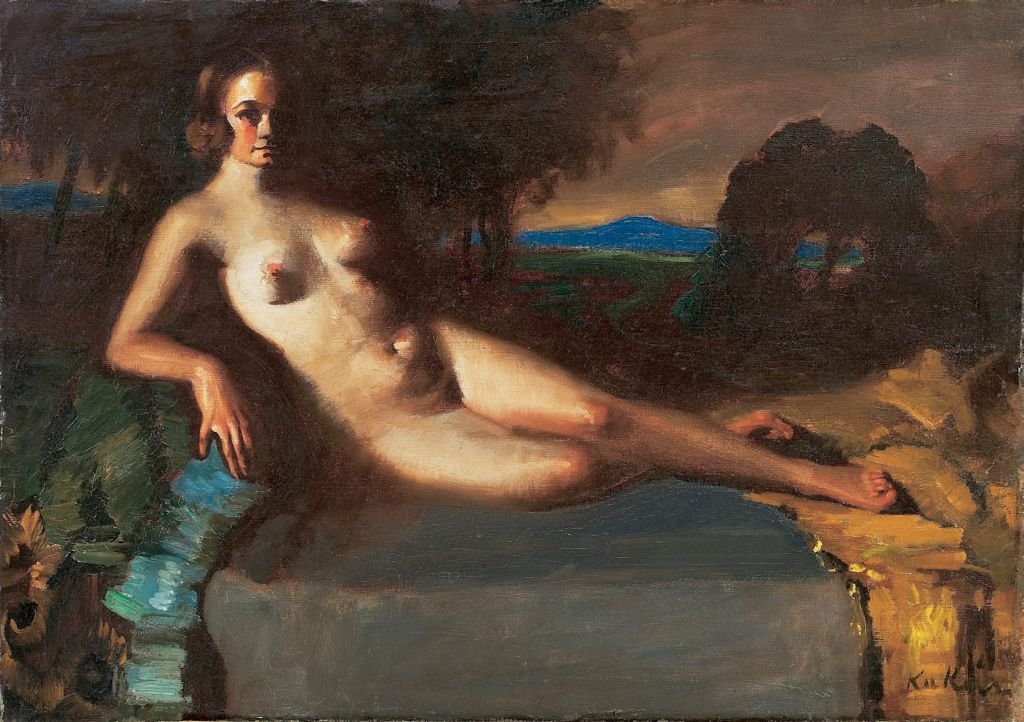
Female Nude

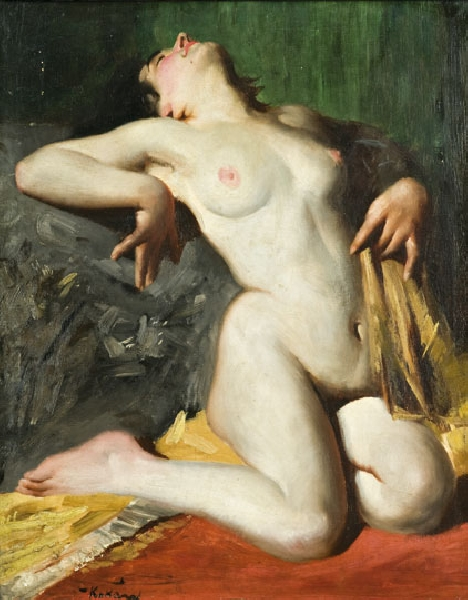
Ecstasy

== Sources ==
- Wagner-Wilke, Annette (2021). "Kukán, Géza". In Beyer, Andreas; Savoy, Bénédicte; Tegethoff, Wolf (eds.). Allgemeines Künstlerlexikon - International Artist Database - Online. Berlin, New York: K. G. Saur. Retrieved 16 October 2022.
- "Kukán, Géza (1890-1936)". Kieselbach Gallery and Auction House. Retrieved 16 October 2022.
