= Vibeke Bärbel Slyngstad =

Norwegian painter and visual artist (born 1968)

- Born: 1968 (age 57–58); Ålesund, Norway
- Education: Norwegian National Academy of Fine Arts
- Style: Contemporary

Vibeke Bärbel Slyngstad (born 1968) is a Norwegian painter and visual artist.

Slyngstad is prominently positioned among Norway’s contemporary figurative painters, and is known for her paintings of psychologically poignant figures and interiors, and landscape painting.

Since around 2016, Slyngstad’s works have increasingly focused on landscapes and depictions of nature. Her style often engages with the dialogue between realism and abstraction.

Slyngstad has exhibited extensively both within Scandinavia and internationally, working with galleries such as OSL Contemporary in Oslo, Norway, Larsen/Warner in Stockholm, Sweden and with Kristin Hjellegjerde Gallery in London, Berlin and Palm Beach.

The artist has been included in exhibitions at prominent institutions such as the National Museum of Norway, Henie Onstad Art Centre, Bergen Kunsthall, Kristiansand Kunsthall (Southern Norway Art Museum), Ålesund kunstforening and Kunsthalle Rostock. Slyngstad has also done several public commissions, and her work can be found in institutions such as the Norwegian University of Science and Technology.

== Early life and education ==
Slyngstad was born in Ålesund, Norway. She is studied at the Meisterschule für Malerei und Bildhauerei in Graz, Austria (1988–89) and the Norwegian Academy of Fine Arts, Oslo, Norway in (1989–94).

Additionally, she studied documentary and animation at Volda University College from 1992 to 1993.

== Artistic practice ==
Vibeke Bärbel Slyngstad is known for her psychologically charged, figurative paintings that often explore landscapes and interior spaces.

Her work engages with the relationship between realism and abstraction, depicting environments that evoke emotional and existential states.

Recent series, such as Brusand, Shuafat, and Kjeholmen, are based on specific landscapes connected to personal and historical memory.

Her paintings often use low viewpoints and a translucent application of oil paint to create immersive and layered scenes.

=== Notable series ===
- Modern Classics (2012–2013): A project where Slyngstad painted modernist architectural landmarks, including Villa Stenersen in Oslo and the Barcelona Pavilion by Mies van der Rohe.
- Brusand: Paintings inspired by the coastal landscapes of Norway, created during artist residencies.
- Shuafat: A series based on the Shuafat area of East Jerusalem, referencing urban life and natural forces.

=== Exhibitions ===
Vibeke Bärbel Slyngstad has exhibited widely in Norway and internationally.

In 2009, she participated in the Nordic Pavilion’s group exhibition The Collectors at the 53rd Venice Biennale. Slyngstad was among the 24 international artists featured in exhibition, which was curated by Elmgreen & Dragset for the Danish and Nordic Pavilions.

The Collectors transformed the pavilions into domestic environments, inviting visitors to experience the fictional lives of the inhabitants through art installations. The exhibition received a special mention in the “Curating Worlds” category from the biennale jury, recognizing its innovative approach to reimagining national pavilions as interconnected domestic spaces.

Her solo show Modern Classics was held at Galleri F 15 in Moss, Norway, in 2012–2013, where she presented paintings of modernist architectural sites such as Villa Stenersen and the Barcelona Pavilion.

In 2017, she had a major solo exhibition titled Color Me Gone at Haugar kunstmuseum, exploring human figures in natural and built environments.

In 2018, her works were included in the large-scale group exhibition Contemporary Chaos at Vestfossen Kunstlaboratorium, which gathered contemporary painters from around the world.

Since 2020, Vibeke Bärbel Slyngstad has held multiple solo exhibitions at Kristin Hjellegjerde Gallery, showcasing her exploration of landscapes and psychological states through painting.

In 2024, she opened the solo exhibition Wild Weeds at OSL contemporary in Oslo, showing new paintings focused on landscape and memory.

== Public collections ==
Slyngstad’s works are part of the following public collections:

- The British Museum
- National Museum of Art, Architecture and Design in Norway
- Southern Norway Art Museum
- Equinor Art Collection
- Nordea Art Collection
- Storebrand Art Collection
- Telenor Art Collection
- Oslo Municipality Art Collection
