= Frida Hansen =

Norwegian artist (1855–1931)

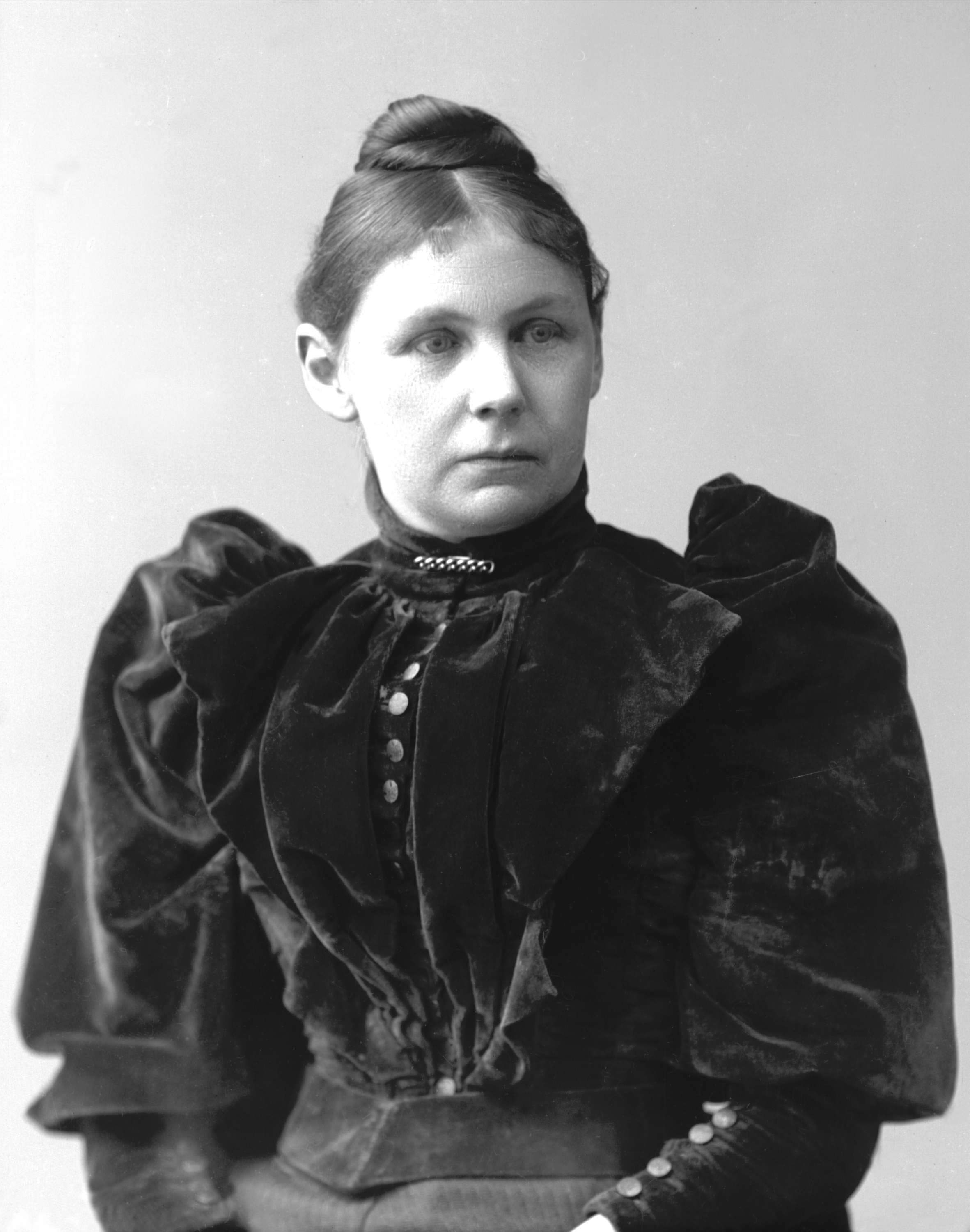
- Hansen in 1896
- Born: Frederikke Bolette Petersen; 8 March 1855; Stavanger, Norway
- Died: 12 March 1931 (aged 76); Oslo, Norway
- Resting place: Ullern cemetery, Oslo, Norway
- Known for: Textile art, Tapestries
- Notable work: Melkeveien (1898)
- Movement: Art Nouveau
- Spouse: Hans Wilhelm Severin Hansen (m. 12. August 1873; Died 1920)
- Children: Elise, Mathilde, Peter

Frederikke "Frida" Bolette Hansen (née Petersen; 8 March 1855 – 12 March 1931) was a Norwegian textile artist in the Art Nouveau style. She has been described as a bridge between Norwegian and European tapestry, and several of her weaving designs are considered among the best made in recent European textile art. Her works are owned by a number of museums, including the National Museum of Norway, Drammens Museum, Stavanger Art Museum and the Nordic Museum in Stockholm.

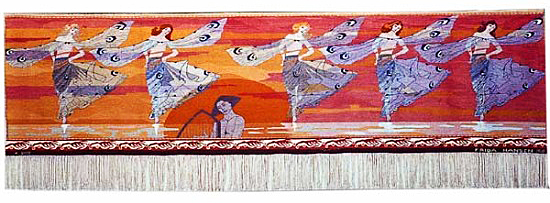
Libellenes Dans (1901)

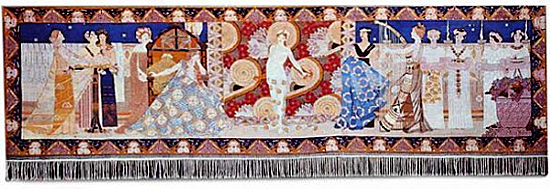
Salomes Dans (1900)

== Early life ==
Hansen was born on March 8th 1855 in Stavanger, Norway, to upper class parents Mathilde (née Helliesen; 1824–1915) and Peter Sickerius Petersen (1811–1875). Her father was a successful merchant and head of reputable company Køhler & Co. Hansen had two older sisters. Her eldest sister passed away from diphtheria in 1866 and the other sister Marie had brain damage from an early age making her need lifelong care.

Hansen went to the all girls private school Frøken Wieses privatskole in Stavanger until she had her confirmation in 1871. She was determined to become a painter from a young age and was given art lessons by her parents where she got to paint with Kitty Kielland, Elisabeth Sinding and Johan Jacob Bennetter.

Because her parents had no sons, Hansen was expected to marry in order to carry on the family lineage. In 1872 she got engaged at 18 years old to a 32 year old Hans Wilhelm Severin Hansen (1842-1920). They married August 12th 1873. Hans Wilhelm Severin Hansen was the brother of painter Carl Sundt-Hansen. When Hansens father died in 1875 the couple moved to Köhlerhuset in Hillevåg. Hansen eagerly engaged in building a garden on the property.

In 1888 the city was hit by an economic downturn. Plough & Sundt, the family business that her husband ran, went bankrupt. Her husband fled abroad for a few years, and Hansen was left with sole responsibility for the family. Two of her three children died. In order to obtain an income, Hansen started an embroidery business in her own home. In the embroidery shop old tapestries were repaired and from doing that repair work she became interested in the ancient techniques that were used to create the images.

In 1889 she was a participant in the first course in weaving in the country, hosted by Randi Blehr at Lærdal in Sogn. When the introductory course was given_{,} Hansen acquired a warp-weighted loom, and she quickly began to create her own images. After a short time she started selling tapestries, and she also had exhibitions in several Norwegian cities. In May 1892 Hansen moved to Oslo and founded Atelier for national Tæppevæving, complete with a dyeing workshop. Her knowledge about dyeing yarn was the basis for the yarn Norges Husflidslag had for sale.

== Studies abroad ==
In the spring of 1895 Hansen was able to study abroad, first to Cologne to study medieval art and then to Paris to study life drawing. In november 1895, one of her tapetries is being shown during the Paris "Exposition Universelle". The impetus she brought from abroad was crucial to her development. In Europe, the prevailing art movement was in the process of change from the national and tradition-bound to symbolism and Art Nouveau (Jugendstil).

== Det norske Billedvæveri ==
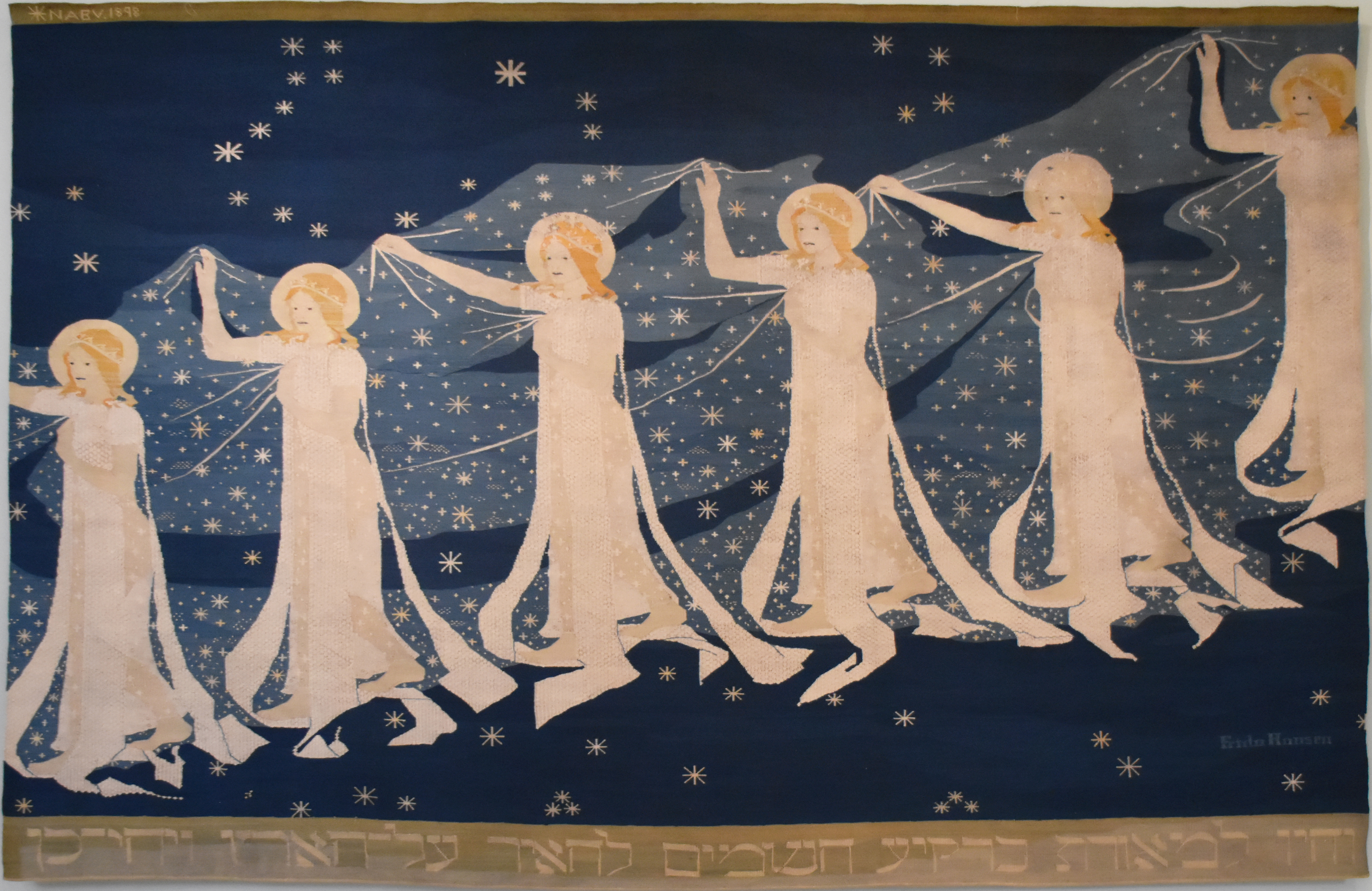
Melkeveien (1898)

From 1897 to 1906, Hansen ran Det norske Billedvæveri, a workshop which mainly worked out of her patterns. There she engaged in drawing, weaving and teaching. At the 1900 World's Fair in Paris, Hansen was awarded the gold medal for her tapestry Melkeveien ('The Milky Way'). The carpet was already purchased for the Museum für Kunst und Gewerbe Hamburg. Experimental techniques led to a special transparent weave, which Hansen patented. This technique was used to create porters or room dividers.

After the turn of the century, Art Nouveau gradually went out of fashion, and by 1920 Hansen's art was no longer as much in demand. In 1915 Hansen received the King's Medal of Merit in gold for her work as a textile artist. From 1926 until her death in 1931, Hansen worked on the St. Olav wall tapestry in Stavanger Cathedral. Hansen died in Oslo and was buried at the cemetery of Ullern Church.

== Work ==
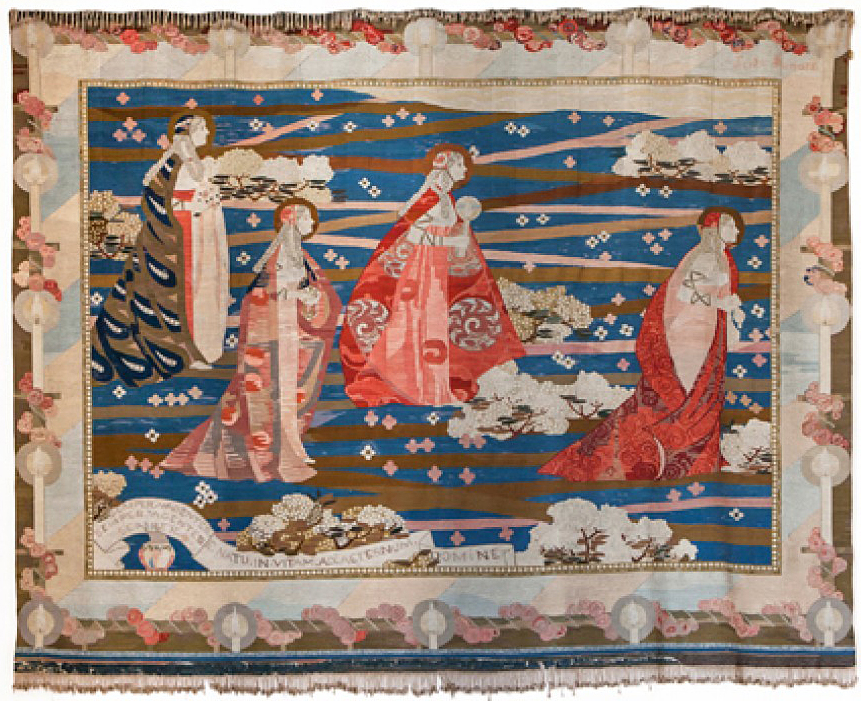
Semper Vadentes (1905)

Hansen's work forms a bridge between Norwegian and European tapestry. Nature was an important source of inspiration, and flowers were special to her. She was strongly influenced by the theory of English textile designer William Morris. Nature was the key which Morris showed conscientiously with abstraction and simplification. When Hansen wanted to abstract a flower, she drew it straight from above or from the side, just as Morris had done before her. Hansen was particularly concerned that the textiles should not be woven paintings, but should have their own expression. What she and Morris had in common was respect and humility towards nature. Hansen was very fond of flowers, a common theme found in her tapestries.

Her tapestries were often faulted for not expressing Norwegian art and culture. In the 1890s and early 1900s, Norwegian nationality was important with art (among other things) identifying the typical Norwegian essence. Hansen responded to the criticism by making art that was more international, much like the decorative art of Morris. One of Hansen's works hangs in the Royal Palace in Oslo. There are two national tapestries designed by Gerhard Munthe, but woven by Hansen. Munthe believed that she was the best in the country for the task. Tapestries hanging in the castle are from the Saga of Sigurd the Crusader. The design was first drawn on carton and later transferred to the loom. Often a workshop consisted of people with different tasks: one person who dyed yarn and arranged the card, and the weaver who transferred to the loom. However, Hansen was technically adept and did everything herself. She usually created full-size cards, dyed the yarn and took care of the transfer.

== Literature ==
- Knut Berg ed. (1981). Norwegian Art History, volume 5 - National growth. Gyldendal Norwegian Publishers, Oslo. ISBN 8205122687 .
- Thue, Annika (1986): Frida Hansen. A European in Norwegian textile art around 1900. Universitetsforlaget. ISBN 978-82-00-07203-4
- Thue, Annika (1973): Frida Hansen (1855-1931) European to the Norwegian art tapestry. Oslo.
