= Stavanger Museum =

Museum of natural and cultural history in Norway

Coordinates: 58°57′53″N 5°43′59″E

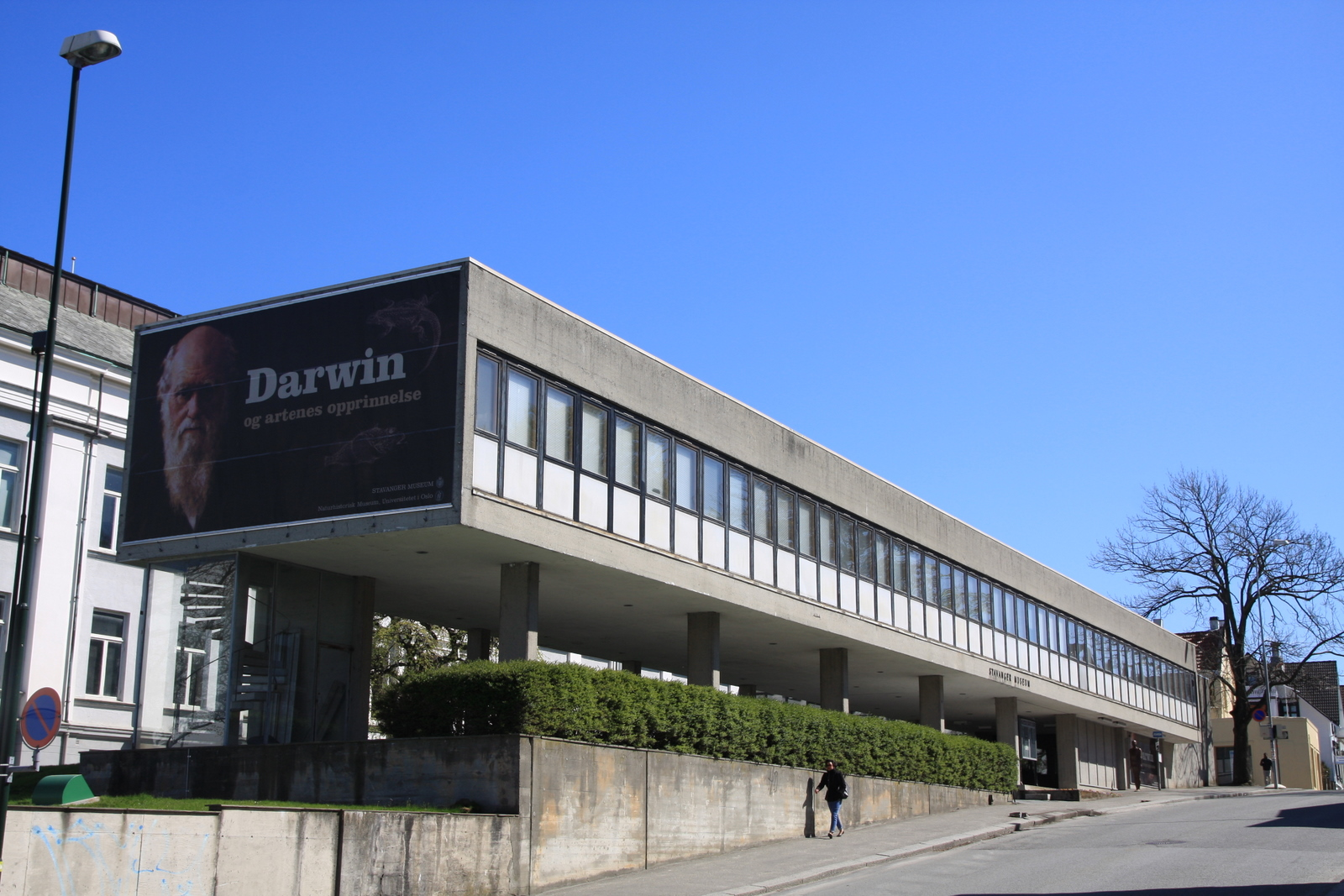
Stavanger Museum

Stavanger Museum is a museum of natural and cultural history established in 1877, located in the Norwegian city Stavanger. The museum's collections consist of several departments: the department of zoology, the department for cultural history (which also includes custodianship of the royal residence Ledaal).

Departments include the Stavanger Museum of Natural History, Stavanger Maritime Museum, Norwegian Children's Museum, Norwegian Printing Museum, Stavanger School Museum, Stavanger Art Museum, and Norwegian Canning Museum.

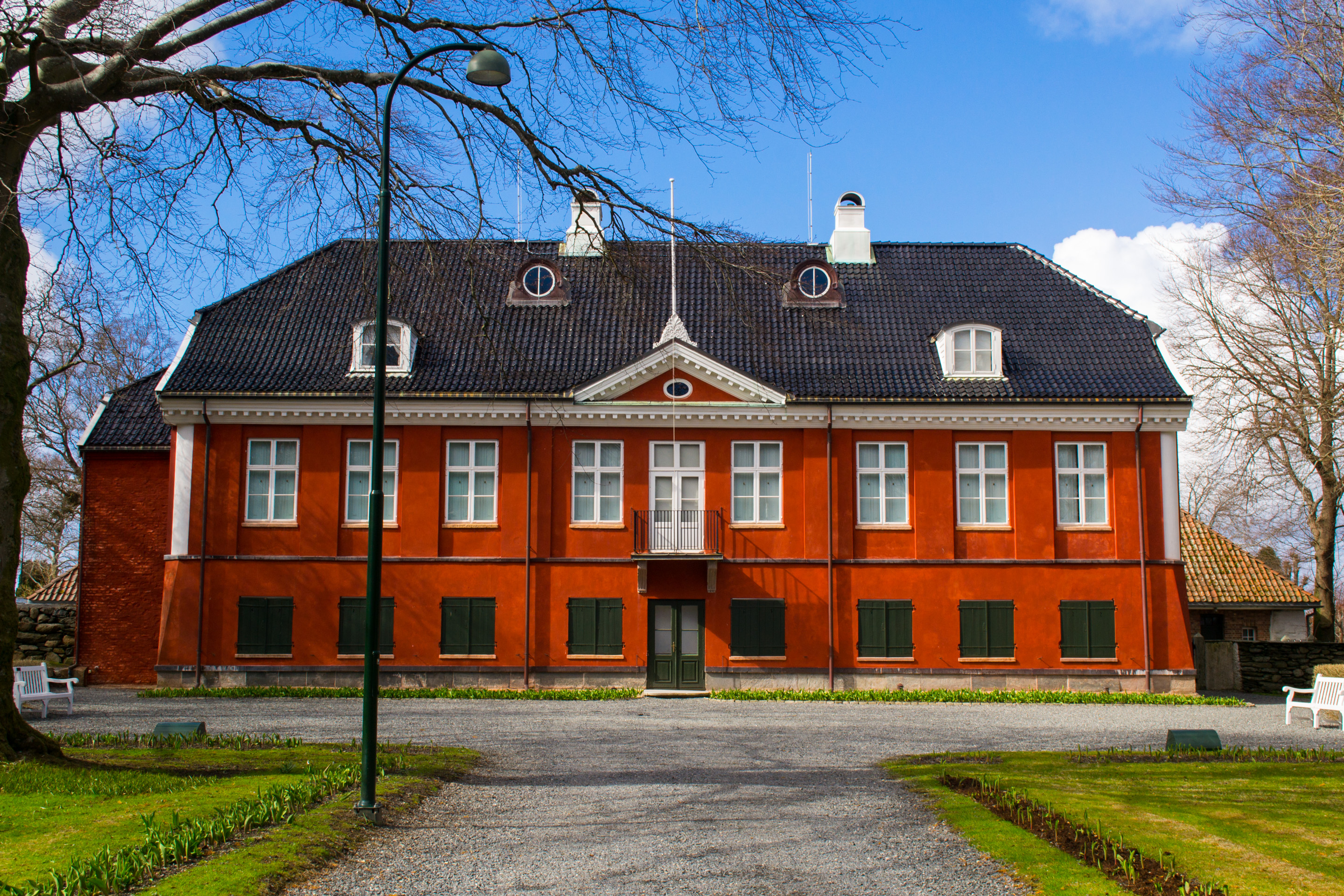
Ledaal royal residence

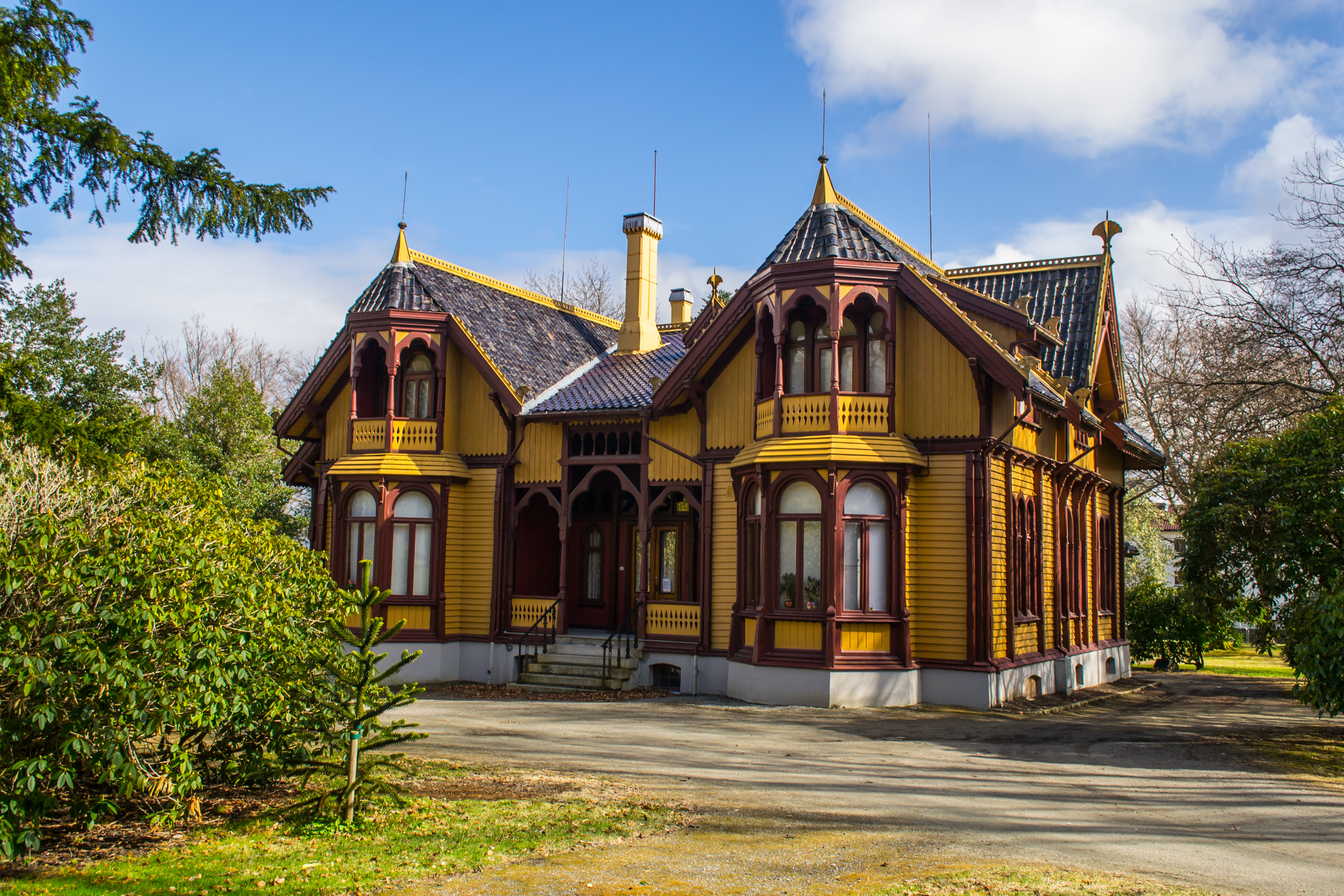
Breidablikk villa

== History ==
Stavanger Museum was founded in 1877, and was first located in a small wooden house in Gamle Stavanger. The museum got its own building, Muségata 3, in 1893, designed by architect Hartvig Sverdrup Eckhoff. The building was extended in 1930, and again in 1964. A major restoration and technical upgrade was performed in 1995.

Ledaal, the summer house of the Kielland family built by Gabriel Schanche Kielland, was bought by Stavanger Museum in 1936 and opened as a royal residence in 1949. The royal residence Ledaal dates from around 1800. Breidablikk Villa is a well-preserved mansion which was built in 1881-1882 for the merchant and ship owner Lars Berentsen (1838-1896) . The villa was designed by architect Henrik Nissen. Breidablikk villa is situated on Eiganes in Stavanger.

The archeological department was split out in 1975, as the new institution, Arkeologisk museum i Stavanger. The Maritime Museum was included in 1979. The Graphical Museum was established in 1991, and included in Stavanger Museum in 2006. The Children's Museum was established in 2000, and incorporated as a department of Stavanger Museum in 2007. The school museum was established in 1925, and incorporated into Stavanger Museum in 2008. The department also incorporates Den Kombinerede Indretning, a collection of local medical history established in 1989 and a part of Stavanger Museum from 2006.

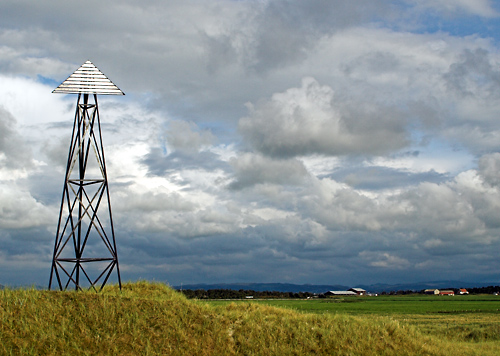
Revtangen Ornithological Station

== Stavanger Museum of Natural History ==
The Stavanger Museum of Natural History (Stavanger naturhistoriske museum) was formerly the Department of Zoology at the Stavanger Museum. The department of zoology was central to the establishing of the museum in 1877, assigned the task of collecting local fauna, and also "exotic" mammals and birds donated by sailors and travelers. From 1918, the museum specialized in ornithological research. Revtangen Ornithological Station is located in an area known for its rich and varied bird life. Stavanger Museum has a station here where migratory birds are tagged or ringed each year. The ornithological station for bird ringing was established in 1937 and is operated by the museum.

== Stavanger Maritime Museum ==
The Maritime Museum was established in 1926 and included as a department of Stavanger Museum from 1979. Until 1984 the exhibitions were at Stavanger Museum's main building in Muségata 16, and were moved to historical locations at the port of Stavanger (Nedre Strandgate 17 and 19) in 1985. The buildings are from the period 1770 to 1840. The exhibition displays the development of the shipping and fishing industry over the last 200 years. The museum owns and operates two older sailboats, Anna af Sand from 1848 and Wyvern from 1896.

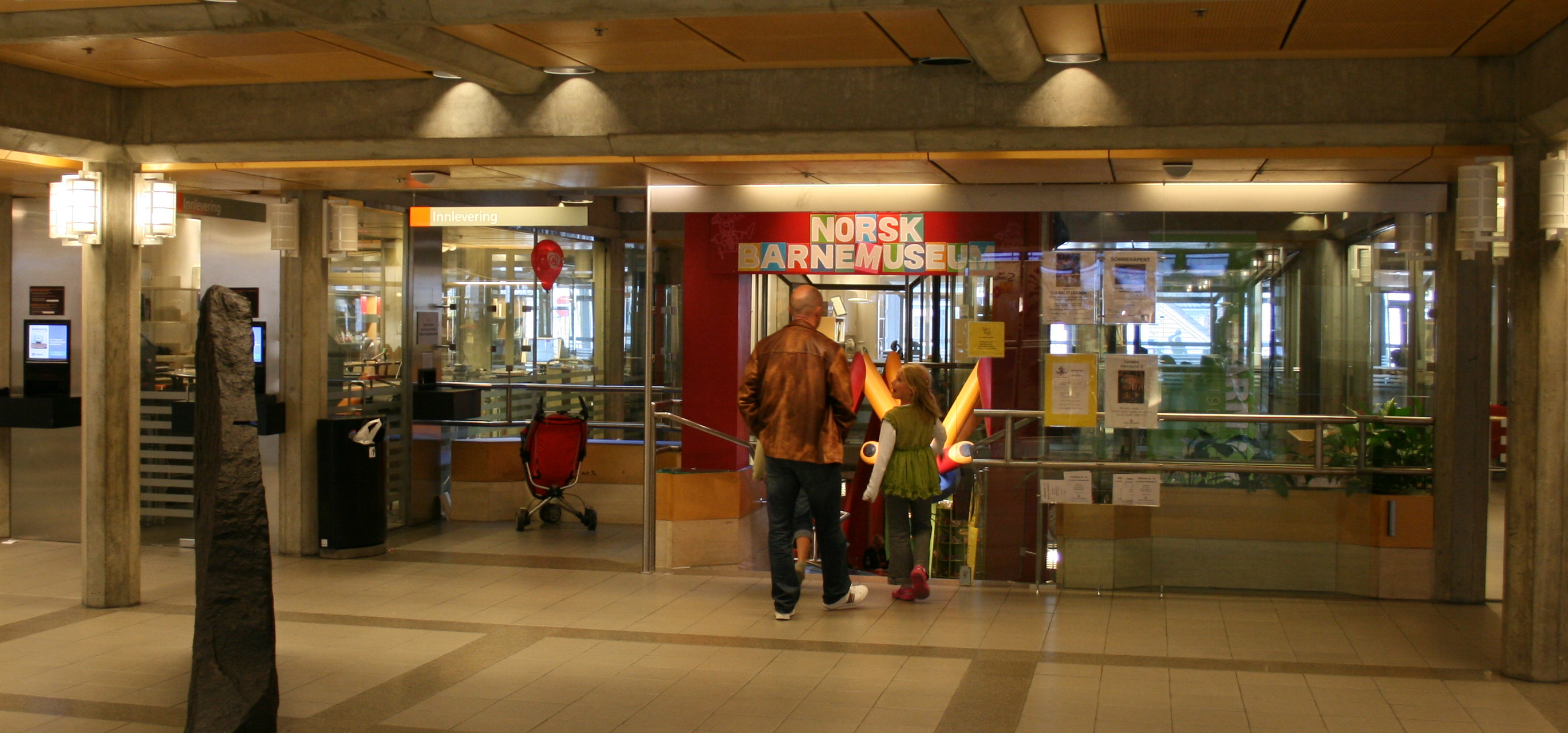
Norwegian Children's Museum

== Norwegian Children's Museum ==
The Norwegian Children's Museum (Norsk Barnemuseum) began as a private foundation and opened doors to the public 24 November 2001. The museum is located in the Stavanger Cultural Centre on Arneageren.

== Norwegian Printing Museum ==
Norwegian Printing Museum (Norsk Grafisk Museum) was established in 1991. Stavanger has always been a center of gravity in the Norwegian printing industry. The museum is located on Bjergsted in Stavanger, and is housed in an old canning stock dating from 1913. The premises are renovated and restored to original condition. Norwegian Printing Museum was officially opened on 23 October 1993.

== Stavanger School Museum ==
Stavanger School Museum (Stavanger skolemuseum) was formerly the Vestlandske Skolemuseum. The museum school is located in a schoolhouse from the 1920s in Hillevåg. The museum which opened in 1925, covers the history of the school in Rogaland. There is a curriculum with role play and dressing up in the school's historic environment.

== Stavanger Art Museum ==
Stavanger Art Museum (Stavanger kunstmuseum) was formerly the Rogaland Museum of Fine Arts. The museum is located on the west side of the lake at Tjensvoll in Stavanger. Stavanger Art Museum opened in 1991. The museum has an extensive collection of more than two thousand works by Norwegian and international art from the 1800s to the present day. Works by Lars Hertervig constitutes a center of gravity, with more than 70 watercolors and oil paintings. Other Norwegian artists from 1800 - and 1900s are represented Kitty Kielland, Edvard Munch, Christian Krogh, Eilif Petersen, Knut Baade, Olaf Lange, Carl Sundt-Hansen and Harriet Backer.

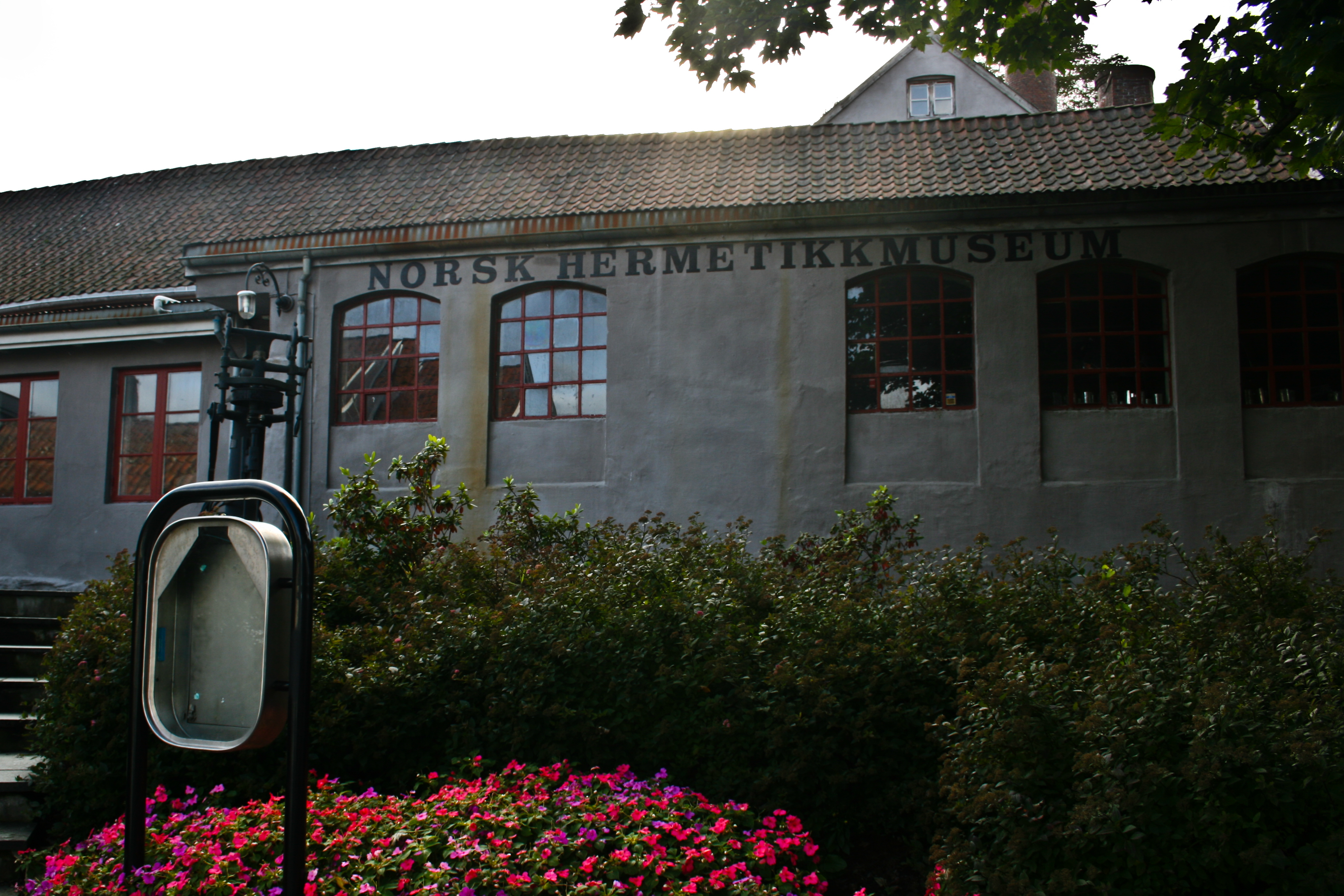
Norwegian Canning Museum

== Norwegian Canning Museum ==
The Norwegian Canning Museum (Norsk Hermetikkmuseum) was established in 1975, and is located in a preserved cannery in Gamle Stavanger, Øvre Strandgate 88 and 90. The oldest parts of the building are from 1841; canning production here lasted from 1916 to mid-1950s. The exhibitions show machinery, tools, photographs, labels and commercials from the canning industry.
