= Carl Sundt-Hansen =

Norwegian-Danish painter (1841–1907)

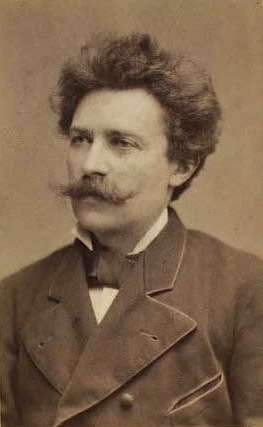
Carl Sundt-Hansen (before 1900)

Carl Fredrik Sundt-Hansen (30 January 1841, Stavanger – 27 August 1907, Stavanger) was a Norwegian-Danish genre painter in the Romantic Nationalist style.

== Biography ==
Carl Sundt-Hansen was born in Stavanger, Norway. He came from an old family of wealthy merchants. He was the son of the merchant and mayor Lauritz Wilhelm Hansen (1816–1871) and his wife Elisa Margaretha Sundt (1814–1892). He adopted his mother's maiden-name (Sundt) in 1878. Originally, he was meant to take over the family business, "Plough & Sundt", but he preferred to become an artist, so he handed the business over to his younger brother, Hans Wilhelm.

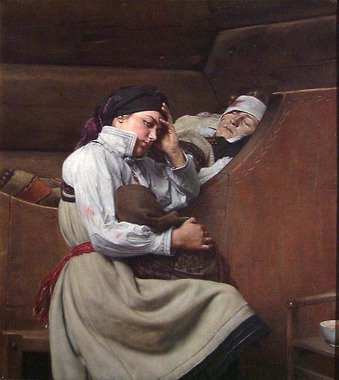
Wounded (1888)

In 1859, he studied at the Royal Danish Academy of Fine Arts and a private school operated by Frederik Ferdinand Helsted. After two years, he transferred to the Kunstakademie Düsseldorf. He took private lessons with Swiss genre painter Benjamin Vautier. In 1864, his first painting was shown at an exhibit by the Oslo Kunstforening and was well received. One of his landscapes was purchased by King Charles IV.

He moved on to Paris in 1866; drawing inspiration from the works of Meissonier and Delaroche. When King Charles visited the Exposition Universelle (1867), he awarded him the Order of Vasa. He stayed in Paris until 1871, when he returned to Norway by way of Düsseldorf. His intention was to establish a studio in Oslo, but the art market there was unpromising. He eventually came to rest in Stockholm, and remained there until 1882.

That year, an economic crisis precipitated by the Paris Bourse Crash forced the family business to declare bankruptcy. The income from his paintings was insufficient, so in an attempt to improve his situation, he moved to Copenhagen. His brother, Wilhelm, was financially ruined and Wilhelm's wife, artist Frida Hansen, had to be the family's support.

He became a Danish citizen in 1889 and was admitted to the Royal Academy as a full member. During this period, his paintings became larger and his subject matter lighter. He lived in Copenhagen until 1896, when he went back to Norway and settled in Valle Municipality.

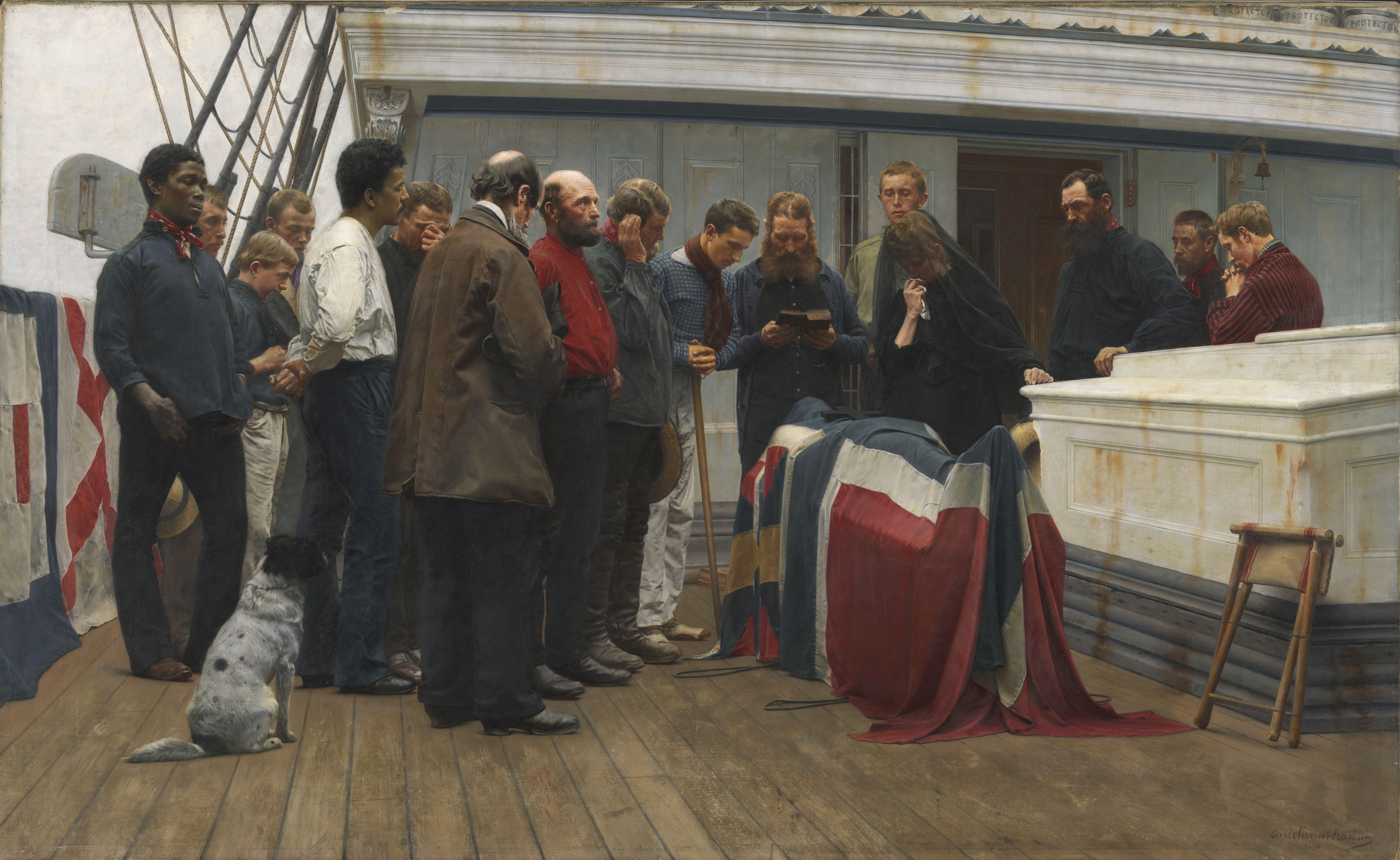
Burial at Sea (1890)

In 1907, he became ill with what was diagnosed as nicotine poisoning. He went to a hospital in Stavanger, where it was discovered that he had cancer. For the last few months of his life, he lived in Stavanger with his brother, Hans.

== Other sources ==
- Hild Sørby (1976) Carl Sundt-Hansen 1841–1907 (Stavanger Lithografiske Anstalt) ISBN 82-990430-1-8
