= Otto Seitz =

German illustrator, painter, draftsman, and collector

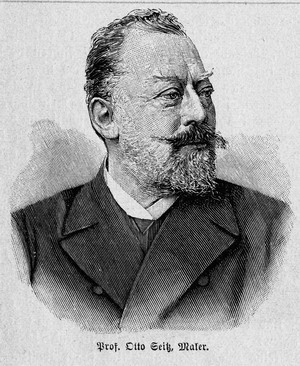
Otto Seitz (c. 1900) from the Bavarian State Library

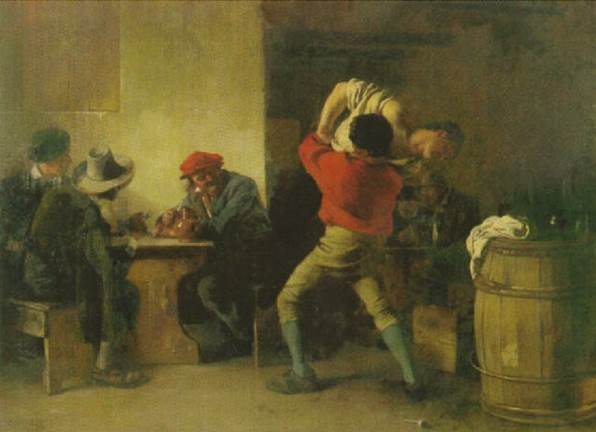
Boozers and Ruffians in a Rural Tavern

Otto Seitz was a 19th-century German painter; born 3 September 1846 in Munich. As a professor with the Academy of Fine Arts, Munich, he was the mentor of many major artists.

== Works ==
His primary subjects were genre scenes, floral still life and landscapes. in works with titles such as:

- "Boozers and Ruffians in a Rural Tavern"
- "Old Farmer at the Table with a Beer Bottle"
- "Street Musicians in the Backyard"
- "Young Waitress"
- "Woodland and Rocks"
- "The Wedding Procession of Neptune and Amphitrite"
- "The Love Letter"
- "Portrait of a Young Italian Woman"

Some of his most famous works are small, sometimes even miniatures, for example, his "Faun and Nymph" (oil on wood) has the dimensions 9 cm x 8 cm (3.5 x 3.1 inches) and "Landscapes" (watercolor / pencil on wood) had lateral dimensions of approximately 2 cm. (not quite 1 inch).

He died March 13, 1912, and was buried in the Old South Cemetery in Munich.
