= Kielland =

Kielland is a Norwegian surname. Notable people with the surname include:

- Alexander Kielland (1849–1906), Norwegian writer
- Axel Christian Zetlitz Kielland (1853–1924), Norwegian civil servant and diplomat
- Christian Bendz Kielland (1858–1934), Norwegian civil servant
- Gabriel Kielland (1871–1960), Norwegian architect, painter and designer
- Gabriel Schanche Kielland (1760–1821), Norwegian businessman and ship owner
- Gustava Kielland (1800–1889), Norwegian author and missionary pioneer
- Jacob Christie Kielland (1897–1972), Norwegian architect
- Jacob Kielland (officer) (1825–1889), Norwegian naval officer and politician
- Jacob Kielland (priest) (1841–1915), Norwegian priest and politician
- Jacob Kielland (businessman) (1788–1863), Norwegian businessperson, consul and politician
- Jens Zetlitz Monrad Kielland (1866–1926), Norwegian architect
- Jens Zetlitz Kielland (1816–1881), Norwegian consul and artist
- Jonas Schanche Kielland (born 1863) (1863–1925), Norwegian jurist and politician
- Jonas Schanche Kielland (1791–1852), Norwegian consul and politician
- Justine Kielland (born 2002), Norwegian footballer
- Kitty Lange Kielland (1843–1914), Norwegian landscape painter
- Marianne Beate Kielland (born 1975), Norwegian mezzo-soprano
- Olav Kielland (1901–1985), Norwegian composer and conductor
- Tycho Kielland (1854–1904), Norwegian jurist

== See also ==
- Per Smith-Kielland (1891–1921), Norwegian painter
- Ingvald M. Smith-Kielland (born 1919), Norwegian military officer and diplomat
- Alexander L. Kielland (platform), Norwegian semi-submersible drilling rig that capsized in 1980
