= Ingvald M. Smith-Kielland Sr. =

Norwegian military officer

Ingvald Mareno Smith-Kielland MVO (2 July 1863 – 1949) was a Norwegian military officer.

A son of Colonel Ingvald Maryllus Emil Smith (1815–1899) and Maren Elisabeth Bull Kielland (1821–1899) his mother was a daughter of Jacob Kielland, sister of Jens Zetlitz Kielland and Jacob Kielland and sister-in-law of Jacob Jørgen Kastrup Sømme. Ingvald Mareno Smith-Kielland was a first cousin of Axel Christian, Jonas, Jacob, Kitty, Alexander, and Tycho Kielland.

In 1889 he married Ragnhild Johanne Duborgh (1869–1961). He was the father of Ingvald Smith-Kielland and Per Smith-Kielland, and a grandfather of Ingvald Mareno Smith-Kielland. Through his wife he was a brother-in-law of William Duborgh.

He became a student in 1881, and was trained as a military officer in 1885. He was a Premier Lieutenant in the Cavalry from 1889, and Rittmester from 1897. He then advanced to Major in 1911 and Colonel in 1917. He led the dragoon regiment Oplandenes Dragonregiment from 1917 to 1928, and was acting leader of the 2nd Division from 1926 to 1928.

He was decorated with the Norwegian Coronation Medal of 1906 and the Belgian Military Cross, and was a Knight First Class of the Order of the Sword, a Knight of the Order of Dannebrog, the Royal Victorian Order and the Legion of Honour.
