= Gabriel Schanche Kielland =

Norwegian businessman and ship owner (1760–1821)

- Born: 4 March 1760; Stavanger, Norway
- Died: 5 March 1821 (aged 61)
- Occupation: ship owner

Gabriel Schanche Kielland (4 March 1760 – 5 March 1821) was a businessman and ship owner in the city of Stavanger in Norway.

In 1790, he took control of the family business Jacob Kielland & Søn and soon became one of the wealthiest and most distinguished figures in the city. Around 1800, he commissioned the building of the large country house Ledaal, which would later become a royal residence in Stavanger. In 1815, he was elected to the Parliament of Norway, though was unable to assume office. His personal success also facilitated the rise to prominence of other members of the Kielland dynasty, who became influential in the commercial, cultural and public life of Stavanger and of Norway for more than a century.

== Career ==
Gabriel Schanche Kielland was born in Stavanger as the only son of captain and businessman Jacob Jansen Kielland (1727–1788) and Elisabeth Schanche (1733–1784).

He originally intended to be a teacher, and studied Classics for seven years with private tuition. In practice, due to his father's declining health and his being the only son, he took over his father's business. He acquired burghership in Stavanger in 1783, and after four years in his own trade company, he became a partner in his father's company in 1787. He also conducted several travels to the Nordic countries, the Kingdom of Great Britain and the Dutch Republic, in order to study trade and to build a business network. After the death of his father in 1788, he bought shares from his sisters. In 1790 he merged the trade company and his inherited properties, creating the company Jacob Kielland & Søn.

The properties included a brickworks in Sandnes. The building of the country-house, Ledaal, was finished in 1803. As well as being a base for leisure and social gatherings, it also functioned as a small, private museum and library. Ledaal was acquired by Stavanger Museum in 1936, and opened as a royal residence in 1949.

Jacob Kielland & Søn was also heavily involved in shipping. In 1801 the company owned one fregate, one barque, six brigs and one galeas.

The company had benefitted from the French Revolutionary Wars, both from trade, since Denmark–Norway was neutral, and also because Kielland was engaged in insurance and, in this capacity, often made a good return when identifiable flotsam was auctioned. As the local vice consul for Great Britain from 1787, his intervention was able to secure respect for the neutrality of Denmark–Norway in 1793 and 1796 from British warships. He held several posts among the notable citizens of Stavanger: he became town lieutenant at a young age and, in 1784, was promoted to command the town vigilantes. In 1801, following the Battle of Copenhagen, the United Kingdom and Denmark–Norway became belligerents and it was the vigilantes of Stavanger who set up the city's coastal batteries.

In the same year, failed crops led to lack of grain in Stavanger Amt. Jacob Kielland & Søn managed, for a good part, to uphold the grain supply. The same thing happened in 1807, when the Gunboat War broke out, an open war between the United Kingdom and Denmark–Norway. Kielland organized grain storage in an initial phase, although others took over. Kielland also contributed personally to funding the standing defence of Norway. The company experienced hardships during the war as many ships were taken by privateers, and trade became difficult. It survived the Gunboat War partly due to "pliable circumvention of taxes". In 1809, Kielland's work during this very difficult time received recognition with the award of: Knight of the Danish Order of the Dannebrog.

He resumed his role as British vice consul in 1816, but was now also consular agent for Prussia, from 1813, plus, from 1817, vice consul for the city-state of Hamburg. In 1815 he was elected to the Parliament of Norway, but illness prevented him from actually assuming office. When he died in March 1821, in Stavanger, he was one of the wealthiest people in the city.

== Family ==
In April 1783 he married Johanna Margaretha Bull (1758–1818), daughter of Jens Bull, himself a former son-in-law of Vincent Stoltenberg (1694–1763), ancestor of the Stoltenberg family.

Gabriel and Johanna Kielland had six children: four sons and two daughters. The eldest son died young, as did the younger daughter, but the three sons who survived – Jens, Jacob and Jonas – all achieved success in their respective fields:

- Jens Bull Kielland: military officer
- Jacob Kielland (1788–1863): successor as chairman of the family business
- Jonas Schanche Kielland (1791–1852): politician

Following the death of his wife, Gabriel Kielland also had a son with Inger Larsdatter Lura (1800–1874):

- Søren Lura (1819–1866): a master cobbler at the age of 23.

Through his second surviving son, Jacob Kielland (1788–1863), he became paterfamilias of two distinguished lines of descent. Confusingly, there is a Jacob Kielland in almost every generation of this families and sometimes within different branches of the same generation, so middle names are often used in reference, though even then many of the family names are still not unique.

Children of Jens Zetlitz Kielland (1816–1881), grandson of Gabriel Kielland:

- Jacob Kielland (1841–1915): priest and politician
- Kitty Kielland (1843–1914): painter
- Alexander Kielland (1849–1906): the famous De Fire Store writer
- Tycho Kielland (1854–1904): jurist and journalist

In turn, Jacob Kielland (1841–1915) was both father and grandfather of prominent architects:

- Jens Kielland (1866–1926): designer of several of the key buildings in Bergen
- Jacob Kielland (1897–1972): his son, worked in Oslo.

The daughters of Jacob Kielland (1788–1863) and Jens Zetlitz Kielland (1816–1881), provide the link to further prominent cousins, among whom the families:

- Smith-Kielland
- Sømme
- Skavlan

Children of Jacob Kielland (1825–1889), naval officer and politician, grandson of Gabriel Kielland:

- Axel Christian Zetlitz Kielland (1853–1924): Foreign Office mandarin
- Christian Bendz Kielland (1858–1934): Home Office mandarin
- Jonas Schanche Kielland (1863–1925): politician

Other distinguished people are likewise linked by marriage to this branch and members include:

- Robert Kloster (1905–1979).
