= Tycho Kielland =

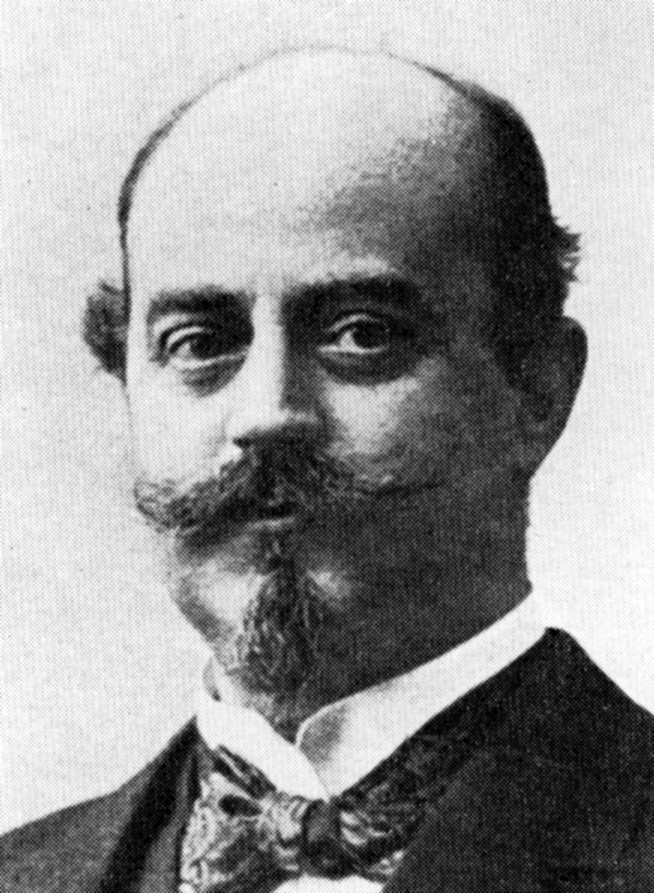
Tycho Kielland, 1967

Tycho Kielland (25 March 1854 – 3 May 1904) was a Norwegian jurist and journalist.

He was born in Stavanger to Jens Zetlitz Kielland (1816-1881) and his wife Christine (1820–1862), née Lange. His grandfather was Jacob Kielland, and an uncle was also named Jacob Kielland. Through his uncle Jacob, Tycho was the cousin of diplomat Axel Christian Zetlitz Kielland, mayor Jonas Schancke Kielland and others. He had four brothers and three sisters, most of them older than he was, although two died young. His oldest brother Jacob became a priest and politician, his oldest sister Kitty became a painter while Alexander became a highly successful novelist. His sister Dagmar married Olaf Skavlan.

Tycho Kielland enrolled in law studies in 1874, and graduated as cand.jur. in 1879. From 1880 he had a career in the Ministry of Auditing. In 1888 he moved to Kristiania and bought Norsk Telegrambureau (NTB), the leading news agency in Norway.

In December 1884 he married Anne Marie Vilhelmine Schlytter (1862-1924) daughter of Johan Christian Schlytter and Sophie Magdalene Manthey. In 1887 the couple had their only child; a son named Fritz who did not lead a distinguished life.

Tycho Kielland committed suicide in 1904. His widow Anne took over as director of NTB, and ran the bureau until 1918 when the media companies took over in a joint ownership.
