= Jacob Kielland =

Jacob Kielland may refer to:

- Jacob Kielland (businessman) (1788–1863), Norwegian businessman, consul and politician
- Jacob Kielland (officer) (1825–1889), naval officer and politician, son of Jacob Kielland (1788–1863)
- Jacob Kielland (priest) (1841–1904), priest and politician, nephew of Jacob Kielland (1825–1889)
- Jacob Christie Kielland (1897–1972), architect, grandson of Jacob Kielland (1841–1915)
