= Zetlitz =

Zetlitz is a given name. Notable people with the name include:

- Axel Christian Zetlitz Kielland (1853–1924), Norwegian civil servant and diplomat
- Bertine Zetlitz (born 1975), Norwegian pop singer
- Christian Zetlitz Bretteville (1800–1871), Norwegian politician
- Henrik Andreas Zetlitz Lassen (1818–1890), Norwegian politician
- Jens Zetlitz (1761–1821), Norwegian priest and poet
- Jens Zetlitz Kielland (1816–1881), Norwegian consul and artist
- Jens Zetlitz Monrad Kielland (1866–1926), Norwegian architect
