= Christian Bendz Kielland =

Norwegian civil servant (1858–1934)

Christian Bendz Kielland (29 October 1858 – 29 May 1934) was a Norwegian civil servant.

== Personal life ==
He was born in Horten to Jacob Kielland and his wife Thora Margrethe (1827–1902), née Bendz. His grandfather was Jacob Kielland, his uncle Jens Zetlitz Kielland and his cousins Kitty Lange and Alexander Kielland. Jonas Schancke Kielland had three older brothers, one older sister and one younger brother. One of the older brothers, also named Christian Bendz Kielland, lived only from 1851 to 1855. His brother Axel Christian Zetlitz Kielland became a diplomat, and the younger brother Jonas Schanche Kielland became a politician.

Christian Bendz Kielland married Cäcilie Wilhelmine Catharine Kopp (1868-1925), a pianist from Kristiania, in 1893. The couple had one son and two daughters.

== Career ==
He enrolled in law studies in 1877, and graduated as cand.jur. in 1882. He was hired in the Ministry of the Interior in 1883, became assistant secretary in 1898 and deputy under-secretary of State (third in rank behind the Minister and the State Secretary) in 1900. He retired in 1915.
