= List of mayors of Stavanger =

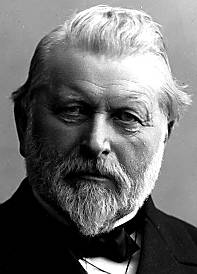
Johannes Steen

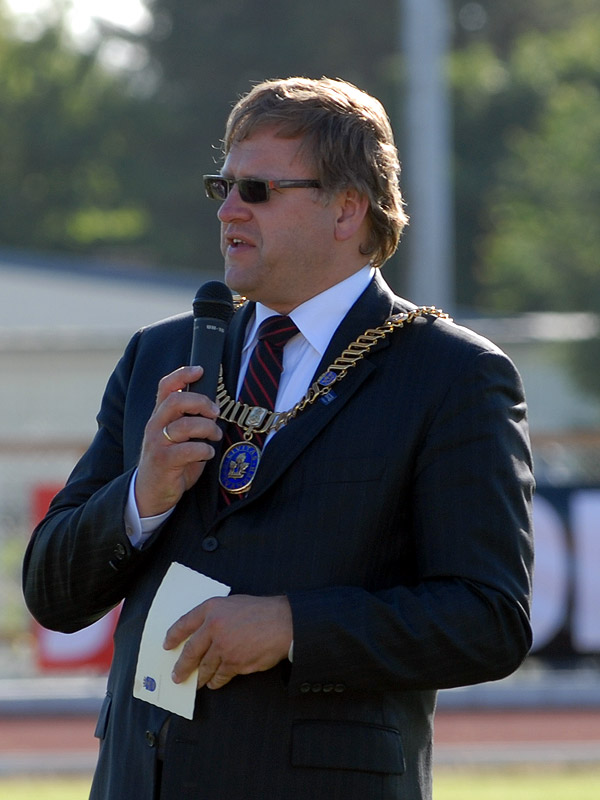
Leif Johan Sevland

This is a list of mayors of Stavanger.

Term	Mayor
1837–1838	Jonas Schanche Kielland
1839	Ole Helliesen
1840	Mathias Wilhelm Eckhoff
1841–1842	Jonas Schanche Kielland
1843–1844	Magnus Andreas Gjør
1845	Jens Jensen
1846	Bernt Hamre
1847–1850	Hans Julius Hammer
1851	Jens Jensen
1852–1859	Nils Fredrik Severin Thambs
1859–1860	Jacob Jørgen Kastrup Sømme
1861–1862	Henrik Andreas Zetlitz Lassen
1863	Andreas Høy
1864–1865	Henrik Andreas Zetlitz Lassen
1866	Lauritz Wilhelm Hansen
1867–1868	Henrik Andreas Zetlitz Lassen
1869	Jacob Jørgen Kastrup Sømme
1870–1871	Jacob Kielland
1872	Johannes Steen
1873	Henrik Oluf Andreas Magnus Løwold Zetlitz
1874–1877	Johannes Steen
1878	Christian Becker Svendsen
1879–1883	Johannes Steen
1884	Lars Berentsen
1885	Johannes Steen
1886–1888	Lars Berentsen
1889–1890	Wilhelm Olsen
1890–1891	Johannes Steen
1892	Søren Tobias Aarstad
1893–1894	Andreas Meling
1895	Henrik Finne
1896	Andreas Meling
1897–1898	Hans Lindahl Falck
1899–1901	Arne Haabeth
1902–1907	Hans Lindahl Falck
1908–1909	Jonas Schancke Kielland
1910	Kristoffer Bertram Louis Berg
1911–1912	Johan Gjøstein
1913–1914	Oddmund Vik
1914–1915	L.T.K. Geertsen
1916–1919	Adam Egede Nissen
1920–1922	Bertram Charles Middelthon
1922–1924	John Norem
1925–1928	Torjer Meling
1929–1931	Andreas Mikal Smedsrud
1932–1934	Johan Marnburg
1935	Birger Pedersen
1936–1937	M.M. Michaelsen
1938–1940	Lauritz Wilhelm Hansen
German occupation of Norway
1945	Lauritz Wilhelm Hansen
1945	Ole Bergesen
1946	Johannes Johnsen
1947–1953	Magnus Karlson
1954	Finn Brodahl
1955	Ragvald Ribsskog
1956–1960	Tjalve Gjøstein
1961–1964	Jan Johnsen
1965–1967	Arne Rettedal
1968–1971	Leif Larsen
1972–1981	Arne Rettedal
1982–1987	Kari Thu
1988–1989	Leif Måsvær
1990–1993	Brit Egaas Røen
1993	Kari Thu
1994–1995	Leif Måsvær
1995–2011	Leif Johan Sevland
2011–2019	Christine Sagen Helgø
2019–2023	Kari Nessa Nordtun
2023–2024	Sissel Knutsen Hegdal
2024–present	Tormod W. Losnedal
