= Jacob Kielland (priest) =

Jacob Kielland (26 July 1841 – 19 June 1915) was a Norwegian priest and politician.

== Personal life ==
He was born in Stavanger to Jens Zetlitz Kielland (1816–1881) and his wife Christine (1820–1862), née Lange. His grandfather was also named Jacob, so was an uncle. Through his uncle, Jacob was the cousin of diplomat Axel Christian Zetlitz Kielland, mayor Jonas Schanche Kielland and others. He had four brothers and three sisters, all of them younger than him, although two died young. His oldest sister Kitty became a painter, his oldest brother Alexander became a highly successful novelist and his youngest living brother Tycho became the owner of the Norwegian News Agency. His sister Dagmar married Olaf Skavlan.

In October 1865 he married Diderikke Jørgine Monrad (1842–1918), daughter of priest Knut Olaus Monrad and Gunhild Kirstine Schlytter. They had five sons and five daughters, of these children one died young. Their oldest son Jens Zetlitz Monrad Kielland became a notable architect and professor. Jens Zetlitz Monrad Kielland had two children; Jacob Christie Kielland an architect and Else Christie Kielland became a painter.

== Career ==
Jacob Kielland enrolled in theology studies in 1859, and graduated as cand.theol. in 1865. He worked as a teacher in his native Stavanger; in 1873 he was school inspector in addition to sexton. In 1876 he was appointed vicar in Lunde Municipality and Hæskestad Municipality in Dalane, and in 1884 he moved to Haugesund to become vicar there.

In Haugesund he entered local politics. He was elected to the executive committee of the municipal council for Haugesund Municipality in 1885. He became mayor in 1888 and deputy mayor in 1889. The same year he was appointed dean in Karmsund prosti (deanery). He was still based in Haugesund, and tried to run for Parliament in 1894 without succeeding. He was politically conservative.

In 1897 he was appointed vicar in Stange Municipality. He retired in 1911, and died in 1915 in Lillehammer. He had been issued the Order of St. Olav.
