= Gustava Kielland =

Norwegian writer and missionary

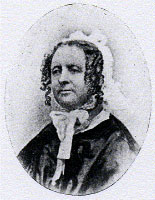
- Born: 6 March 1800; Kongsberg, Norway
- Died: 28 February 1889 (aged 88); Skien, Norway
- Occupation: Author

Susanne Sophie Catharina Gustava Kielland (née Blom, 6 March 1800 – 28 February 1889) was a Norwegian author and missionary pioneer.

== Biography ==
She was born in Kongsberg as a daughter of customs officer Gustavus Blom and his wife Karen Petronelle Stoltenberg. According to Norsk biografisk leksikon her name was Susanne Sophie Catharina Gustava and not Susanne Sophie Caroline Gustava, as many believe. In May 1824 in Drammen she married the minister Gabriel Kirsebom Kielland (1796-1854). Her husband was also a first cousin once removed of Gabriel Schanche Kielland and second cousin of Jacob Kielland.

She spent most of her life in the parishes of Finnøy and Lyngdal, where her husband was stationed as vicar. She was influenced by the Moravian Church, but did not become involved in missionary activity until 1840. Following a missionary lecture in Stavanger, she regretted her "lukewarm" attitude to mission. Then, back in Lyngdal, she formed a Christian-social women's association consisting of herself, three farmer's wives and one farmer's daughter. With the foundation date 13 November 1840, this is considered the country's first women's association. Her association soon expanded, spreading to Austad and Kvås.

Today she is best known for her literary output. Several of the songs she wrote are still well known, in particular the Christmas carol "O, Jul med din Glæde", and the children's song "Liden Ekorn". Late in her life, she dictated her memoirs Erindringer fra mitt liv (Reminiscence from my Life), printed in manuscript form for her family in 1882. In 1899 an edited version was released for a wider audience. The book was one of the first autobiographies written by a woman in Norway.

She had four sons and four daughters. She suffered from blindness between age 73 and 78, but regained eyesight after an operation. She died in February 1889 in Skien, at the time living with one of her daughters and her son-in-law Andreas Hauge. She was also the paternal grandmother of engineer Nils Vogt Kielland and writer Eugenia Marie Kielland.
