= Wilhelm Aarstad =

Norwegian politician (1854–1933)

- Born: 1854; Aarstad, Egersund
- Died: 1933 (aged 78–79); Stavanger
- Occupations: Merchant and Politician
- Movement: Free-minded Liberal Party

Wilhelm Aarstad (15 January 1854 – May 1933) was a Norwegian politician for the Liberal Left Party.

He was born at Aarstad in Egersund as a son of farmers. He was a first cousin of Søren Tobias Årstad, and moved to Stavanger to be a merchant like Søren's side of the family.

He was elected to Stavanger city council, and in 1909 to the Parliament of Norway as a deputy representative. He was the running mate of Jonas Schanche Kielland, and met in his place in parliamentary session in both 1911 and 1912.

Aarstad died in Stavanger in May 1933, 79 years old.
