= Jens Kielland =

Jens Kielland is the name of:

- Jens Zetlitz Kielland (1816–1881), consul and artist
- Jens Zetlitz Monrad Kielland (1866–1926), architect, grandson of Jens Zetlitz Kielland
