= Ingvald Smith-Kielland =

Norwegian military officer, diplomat, sports official and royal servant

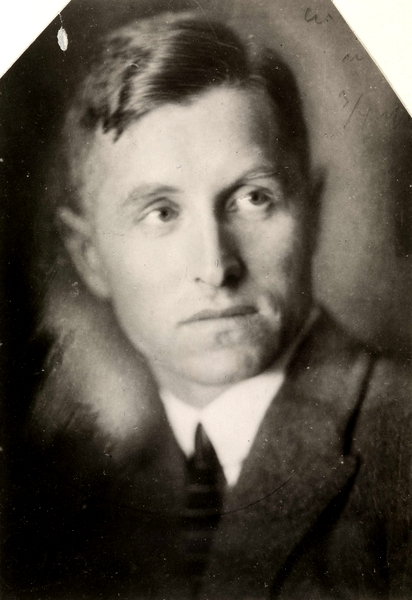
Ingvald Smith-Kielland, c. 1933

Ingvald Marillus Emil Smith-Kielland (9 August 1890 – 29 January 1984) was a Norwegian military officer, diplomat, sports official, and royal servant.

He was born in Egge Municipality as the son of Colonel Ingvald Mareno Smith-Kielland (1863–1949) and Ragnhild Johanne Duborgh (1869–1961). He was a brother of painter Per Smith-Kielland. Through his grandmother Maren Elisabeth Bull Kielland (1821–1899), he was a first cousin once removed of people like Alexander Kielland.

He finished his secondary education in 1908, and graduated from the Norwegian Military Academy in 1911 and the Norwegian Military College in 1913. After some years in the military he joined the Ministry of Foreign Affairs in 1920, where he helped to negotiate Norwegian fishing rights near Eastern Greenland ("Erik the Red's Land"). He also negotiated with Spain and Portugal when these wine-exporting countries complained about the prohibition in Norway, in effect since the prohibition referendum of 1919. The temperance movement had won the referendum, and Smith-Kielland had been a part of this movement, but he withdrew due to the difficult situation for Norway. Somewhat due to the pressure of Spain and Portugal, the prohibition was lifted after a new referendum in 1926.

Also, before World War II, Smith-Kielland was a sports official. He was the secretary-general of the International Ski Federation from 1933 to 1936 and chaired the Norwegian Skiing Federation from 1934 to 1936. He also oversaw the Norwegian delegations to the 1920 Summer Olympics and the 1928 and 1932 Winter Olympics. In 1918 he married Elisabeth Hesselberg-Meyer (1897–1982), daughter of a landowner.

From 1929 to 1938, Smith-Kielland was a subdirector in the Ministry of Foreign Affairs. He then worked as a counsellor of the Norwegian legation in London from 1938 to 1941 and 1943 to 1944, and as military attaché at the Norwegian legation in Stockholm from 1941 to 1943. In 1943 Smith-Kielland attended the wedding of prominent Nazi Bjørn Østring. Among the other wedding guests were Nazis Vidkun Quisling, Sverre Riisnæs, Frederik Prytz, Axel Heiberg Stang, Rolf Jørgen Fuglesang. From 1944 he worked for the Czech government-in-exile, and after the war's end he became ambassador to the Czechoslovak Republic. He also had responsibility for Austria from 1946, but after the Communist coup in 1948 he returned to Norway. He spent one year in the Ministry of Foreign Affairs before becoming a part of the Court of the Norwegian royal family.

In 1949 he was appointed as chamberlain and court marshal by King Haakon VII of Norway, and in 1955 he was promoted to lord chamberlain, leaving the position as court marshal vacant for the time being. As lord chamberlain he was the highest economic and administrative officer in the Royal Palace, and also had responsibility for Oscarshall, Skaugum, Kongsseteren and Bygdø Kongsgård. In 1958, one year after King Haakon's death, the entire court of the Norwegian royal family consisted of as few as seven people; Smith-Kielland, Richard Andvord, Odd Grønvold (who eventually had succeeded Smith-Kielland as court marshal) and Ellinor Grønvold, Ingeborg von Hanno and Vincent Bommen. Smith-Kielland retired as lord chamberlain in 1966. His son Ingvald Mareno Smith-Kielland later served as court marshal from 1966 to 1985 and lord chamberlain from 1985 to 1991.

Ingvald Smith-Kielland was decorated with the Grand Cross of the Royal Norwegian Order of St. Olav, the Danish Order of the Dannebrog, the Swedish Order of the Polar Star, the Order of the Lion of Finland, the Icelandic Order of the Falcon and the British Royal Victorian Order. He was also admitted into the exclusive skiing-based social club SK Ull in 1973. He died in January 1984 in Oslo. He and his wife were buried at Vår Frelsers gravlund.

Sporting positions
Preceded by Gunnar Jahr	Chairman of the Norwegian Ski Federation; 1934–1936	Succeeded by Arnt Nygaard
