= Søren Tobias Årstad =

Norwegian jurist and politician

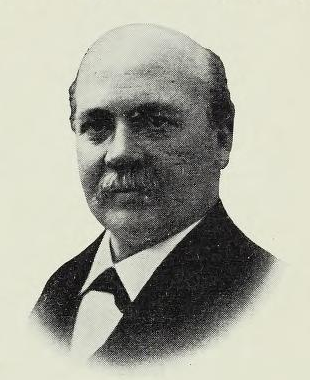

President of the Storting
- In office 1 January 1913 – 31 December 1915 Serving with Jørgen Løvland and Gunnar Knudsen
- Prime Minister: Jens Bratlie; Gunnar Knudsen
- Preceded by: Magnus Halvorsen; Wollert Konow; Jens Bratlie
- Succeeded by: Ivar P. Tveiten; Martin Olsen Nalum; J. L. Mowinckel

Minister of Justice
- In office 21 April 1902 – 22 October 1903
- Prime Minister: Otto Blehr
- Preceded by: Ole Anton Qvam
- Succeeded by: Francis Hagerup

Minister of Finance
- In office 6 November 1900 – 8 June 1901
- Prime Minister: Johannes Steen
- Preceded by: Georg A. Thilesen
- Succeeded by: Elias Sunde

Member of the Norwegian Parliament
- In office 1 January 1898 – 31 December 1900
- Constituency: Stavanger og Haugesund

Mayor of Stavanger
- In office 1 January 1891 – 31 December 1892
- Preceded by: Johannes Steen
- Succeeded by: Andreas Meling

Personal details
- Born: 2 June 1861 Stavanger, Rogaland, United Kingdoms of Sweden and Norway
- Died: 11 January 1928 (aged 66)
- Party: Liberal
- Occupation: Jurist; Politician

Søren Tobias Årstad (2 June 1861 – 11 January 1928) was a Norwegian jurist and politician for the Liberal Party.

He was mayor of Stavanger from 1891 to 1892, and a member of the Storting from 1897 to 1900. A member of the cabinet Steen, he served as Minister of Finance, and he was Minister of Justice and the Police in Otto Blehr's first cabinet. A member of the Storting from 1912 to 1915, he served as vice president and president of the Storting.

== Personal life ==
Årstad was born in Stavanger as a son of merchant Edvard Årstad and his wife Signe Amalie Torjusen. He was a first cousin of Wilhelm Aarstad. He married Barbro Cecilie Rasmussen in 1890.

== Career ==
Årstad finished his secondary education in 1879 and graduated with the cand.jur. degree in 1885. After some time as junior solicitor in Risør he settled as an attorney in Stavanger in 1885. He was elected to the city council, and served as Mayor of Stavanger from 1891 to 1892.

He was elected to the Parliament of Norway from Stavanger og Haugesund in 1897, serving until 1900. He then served as Minister of Finance from 1900 to 1901, member of the Council of State Division in Stockholm until 1902, then Minister of Justice and the Police until October 1903.

In 1903 he was appointed as the district stipendiary magistrate in Ryfylke District Court. He was elected to Parliament for a second term in 1912, serving until 1915. During this period he also served as vice president and president of the Parliament. He was decorated Knight, First Class of the Order of St. Olav in 1901, and Commander, First Class in 1903. He died in January 1928.

The street Søren Årstads vei in the borough of Hillevåg, Stavanger, was named after him in 1954.

Political offices
Preceded by Johannes Steen	Mayor of Stavanger; 1891–1892	Succeeded by Andreas Meling
Preceded by Georg August Thilesen	Minister of Finance; 1900–1901	Succeeded by Elias Sunde
Preceded by Ole Anton Qvam	Minister of Justice and the Police; 1902–1903	Succeeded by Francis Hagerup
