= Magne Hagen =

Magne Hagen (born 25 January 1938) is a retired Norwegian royal servant.

== Biography ==
Hagen started with a military career, and held the rank of lieutenant colonel. He was first hired in the Royal Court in 1974, as an aide-de-camp of King Olav V. He became private secretary in 1979. When Olav V died in 1991 and was replaced with Harald V, Hagen continued as private secretary. In the beginning of that year, it was noted that the entire court of the Norwegian royal family comprised as little as nine people: Hagen, Ingvald M. Smith-Kielland, Kaare Langlete, Ingegjerd Løvenskiold, Gunerius Flakstad and Barbara Iliff.

Hagen remained in his position until his retirement on 1 February 2000. Two days later he was summoned to a private audience with the king and queen, where he was decorated with the Grand Cross of the Royal Norwegian Order of St. Olav, a rare decoration for non-royals.

He is also a former leader of Norges Orienteringsforbund. He resides in Strømmen.
