= Stavanger Cathedral School =

Upper secondary school in Rogaland, Norway

Coordinates: 58.9693°N 5.73272°E

- Stavanger katedralskole
- Schola Stavangriensis
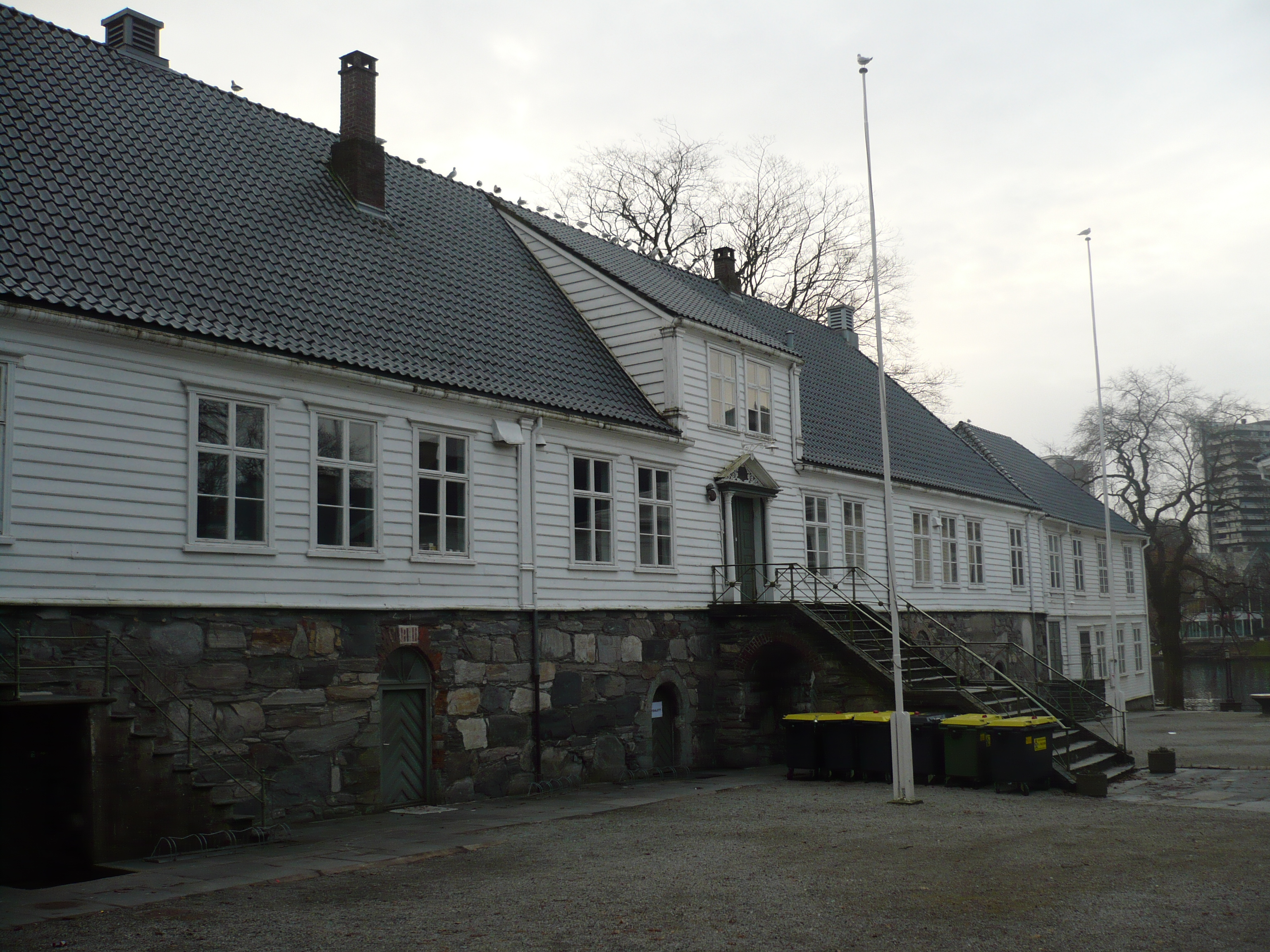
- Stavanger; Norway

Information
- Type: Upper secondary school
- Mottoes: Through adversity to the stars
- Established: 1824; 202 years ago
- Head of school: Grethe Maria Synnøve Mahan
- Employees: 94
- Enrollment: 555
- Website: www.stavanger-katedralskole.vgs.no

Stavanger Cathedral School (Norwegian: Stavanger katedralskole) is an upper secondary school in the city of Stavanger, Rogaland county, Norway. It is spread over two areas; the traditional Kongsgård and the school's new building in Bjergsted.

The school has 555 students and 94 staff members as of 2017.

== Courses ==
The school specializes in music, dance and drama as well as natural and social sciences, and foreign languages, offering courses in German, Spanish, English, French, and Arabic.

== Student body ==
The school attracts many talented students and has consistently fostered prestigious academic performances at a national level, aided by a high teacher-to-student ratio. The students at Stavanger Cathedral school are known for being highly politically active, expressing especially left wing opinions that have been traditionally over-represented, even though the school praises itself as diverse community. The school has a student-run international aide project called Project for International Solidarity that raises funds for Palestinian refugee camps in Beirut and Bethlehem.

== Building ==
Its main building is among the city's most characteristic buildings. Along with Oslo Cathedral School, Stavanger Cathedral School has been known for being one of the few elite secondary schools in Norway.

== People associated with the school ==
=== Notable alumni ===
- Alexander Kielland, writer, mayor
- Sigbjørn Obstfelder, poet
- Fartein Valen, composer
- Christian Lous Lange, politician
- Jan Egeland, diplomat
- Aslak Sira Myhre, politician
- Laila Goody, actress
- Tore Renberg, writer
- Torstein Tvedt Solberg, politician
- Eili Harboe, actress

=== Notable Staff ===
- Hartvig Sverdrup Eckhoff, architect and art teacher
- Arvid Knutsen, former footballer
- Gustav Natvig-Pedersen

== In popular culture ==
The main character of Tore Renberg's novel The Man Who Loved Yngve (2003) is a student at Stavanger Cathedral School. The school is one of the main locations in both the book and the movie.

Alexander Kielland's 1883 novel Poison is a criticism of the Norwegian education system. The Latin School, which the main characters attend, is based on the author's own experiences when he attended Stavanger Cathedral School.
