= Gunnar Jahr =

Gunnar Jahr (16 June 1884 – 1968) was a Norwegian businessperson, sports official and politician for the Conservative Party.

He was born at Haug in Bærum. After middle school and agricultural school, he was hired in the company P. H. Matthiessen. From 1910 he owned the freight company P. Nielsen.

He chaired the employers' association Oslo Speditions- og Transportforening from 1918 to 1921 and 1924 to 1925, and also chaired Nordic Association of Freight Forwarders. He was a supervisory council of Schøyens Bilcentraler.

He was a member of the executive committee of municipal council from 1929 to 1931, and chaired the control committee of Bærums Sparebank. He chaired the skiing club Bærums SK from 1924 to 1927, was a board member of the Norwegian Confederation of Sports from 1930 to 1932 and chaired the Norwegian Ski Federation from 1932 to 1934.

Sporting positions
Preceded by Olaf Helset	Chairman of the Norwegian Ski Federation; 1932–1934	Succeeded by Ingvald Smith-Kielland
