= Andreas Meling =

Norwegian ship owner and politician

- Born: 22 September 1839; Sole, Norway
- Died: 8 August 1928 (aged 88)
- Occupations: ship owner and politician
- Awards: Order of St. Olav (1896)

Andreas Meling (22 September 1839 – 8 August 1928) was a Norwegian ship owner and politician.

== Biography ==
He was born in Sole (in the old Håland Municipality) as a son of bailiff Enok Torgersen and Elen Røgh Skavlan. In 1864 he married Lina Monsen, whose brother was a locally known painter and sister married Peter Hærem. Meling was a shipmaster for much of his career, until 1881.

He served as Mayor of Stavanger from 1893. He was elected to the Parliament of Norway in 1894, after having previously served as a deputy representative. He was decorated as a Knight, First Class of the Order of St. Olav in 1896.

Political offices
Preceded by Søren Tobias Årstad	Mayor of Stavanger; 1893–1894	Succeeded by Henrik Finne
Preceded by Henrik Finne	Mayor of Stavanger; 1896	Succeeded by Hans Lindahl Falck
