= Thomas Scheen Falck =

Norwegian ship-owner

Thomas Scheen Falck, Jr. (19 February 1892 – 1 November 1972) was a Norwegian ship-owner.

== Biography ==
He was born at Stavanger in Rogaland as a son of ship-owner and consul Hans Lindahl Falck (1863–1937) and Karen Johanne Poulsson (1866–1952). He was an uncle of Einar Falck. He finished his secondary education at Bergen Handelsgymnasium in 1909 and took a business education in Cologne in 1911. He worked in Kronstadt and St. Petersburg from 1912 to 1918; the last three years as co-owner of the transport company Ejbøl, Falck & Co. He became director of the foreign department in Bergenske Dampskibsselskab in 1918, and was promoted to sub-director in 1929 and director in 1933. In 1943 he finally took over as chief executive officer, succeeding Einar Joys. He remained chief executive of Bergenske Dampskibsselskab until 1960, and then chaired the company until 1963.

In his time, Falck was not uncontroversial after his actions during the occupation of Norway by Nazi Germany. He was named as "Vertrauensmann Norwegischer Schiffsfahrt" after the German invasion in May 1940, and was on many occasions ordered to perform services for the German occupiers. This work yielded substantial profit. On the other hand, the company lost a great deal of tonnage at sea during the war, and also lost its headquarters in the 1944 Vågen explosion. Falck was also acting vice president of the Norwegian Shipowners' Association, where he had been a board member since 1937, and refused to let the Nazi authorities take control over the organization. The Shipowners' Association was declared illegal in 1943, and Falck continued underground in its central board; hosting several meetings in his own Mjølfjell cabin. He also met with Nortraship and Norwegian authorities-in-exile. He even served as an agent for the Special Intelligence Service, with the codename "S 19".

After the war he was scrutinized for "economic treason", but was acquitted. He was also given the Defence Medal 1940–1945 for resistance to the Germans. He was formally named vice president of the Shipowners' Association in 1945, and chaired the organization from 1948 to 1950. Falck was also a co-founder and board member of Det Norske Luftfartselskap from 1935. He had then survived an airplane crash outside of Haugesund in 1920. He was also a board member of Scandinavian Airlines System from 1946 to 1949; being chairman from 1947 to 1948. He was also a board member of Bergen Port Authority from 1935 to 1961 and chaired the Mjølfjell Youth Hostel (Mjølfjell Ungdomsherberge) from 1940 to 1950 and the Norway Travel Association (Landslaget for Reiselivet i Norge) from 1955 to 1957.

== Personal life ==
He was married to Hanna Gjerde (1890–1929) from August 1916. After her death he married Ingeborg Landmark Anthonisen (1905–1955) in July 1933. After her death he married for the third time, in 1964, this time to Astrid Kolderup, née Christie (1907–2000). Thomas Scheen Falck died in November 1972 in Bergen. His son, Hans L. Falck (born 1921), was a board member of Bergenske Dampskibsselskab from 1961 to 1967. He was decorated as a Commander of the Order of St. Olav (1951), Order of the Dannebrog, Order of the Crown of Italy and the Order of Ouissam Alaouite; Commander First Class of the Order of Vasa; Grand Officer of the Order of Leopold II and Order of Orange-Nassau; and Officer of the Legion of Honour.

Business positions
Preceded by Einar Joys	Chief executive of Bergenske Dampskibsselskab; 1943–1960	Succeeded by Erik Waaler
Preceded by	Chair of Scandinavian Airlines System; 1947–1948	Succeeded by
Preceded by	President of the Norwegian Shipowners' Association; 1948–1950	Succeeded by
