= Andreas Høy =

Norwegian politician

Andreas Høy (12 May 1817 in Kristiansand – 22 November 1886) was a Norwegian politician.

He was elected to the Norwegian Parliament in 1859, representing the constituency of Stavanger. He worked as a merchant in that city. He only sat one term.

On the local level, he was mayor of Stavanger in 1863.

Preceded by Henrik Andreas Zetlitz Lassen	Mayor of Stavanger; 1863	Succeeded by Henrik Andreas Zetlitz Lassen
