= Jacob Jørgen Kastrup Sømme =

Norwegian businessman, consul and politician

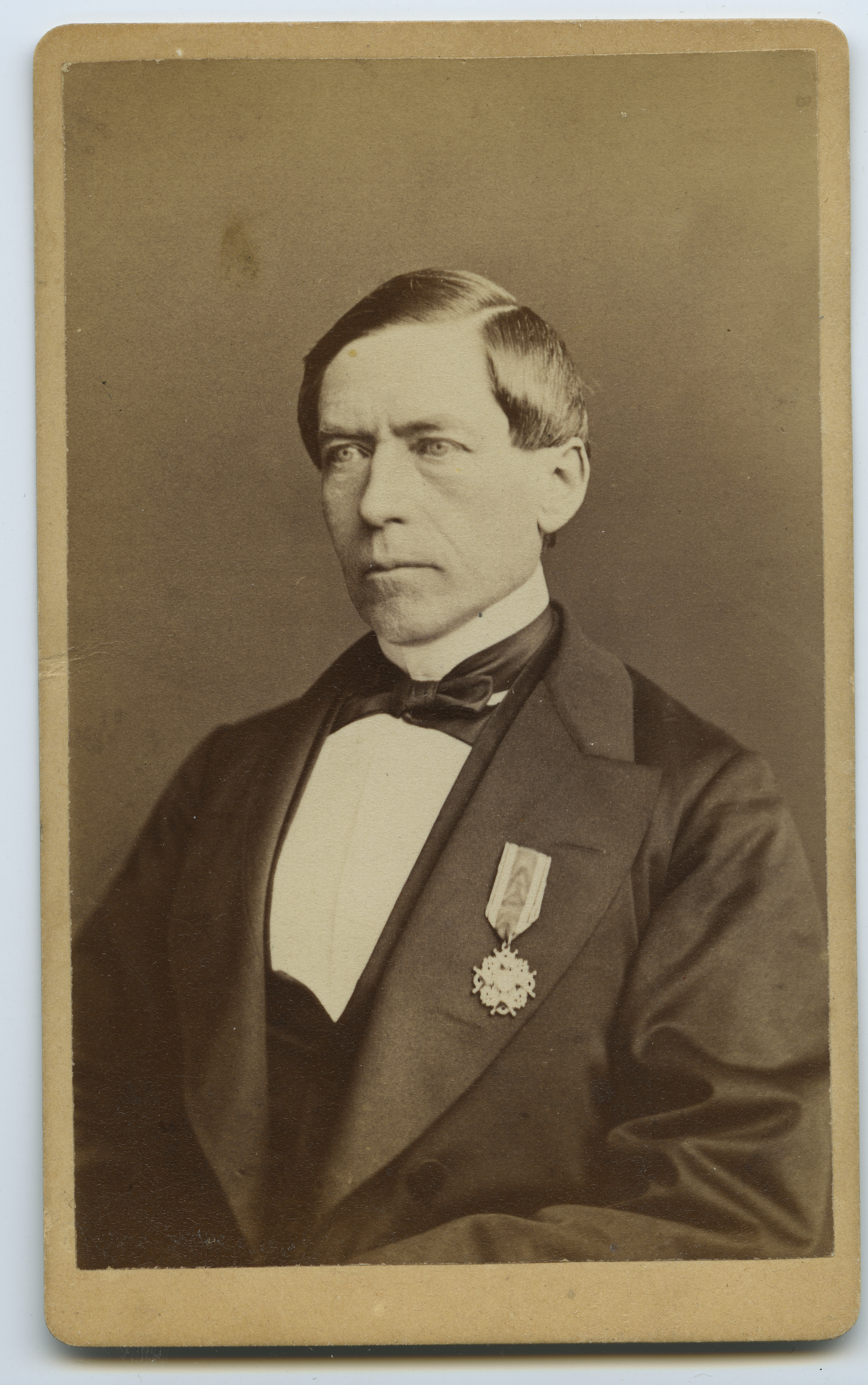
Jacob Jørgen Kastrup Sømme (1817–1893) ca. 1868.

Jacob Jørgen Kastrup Sømme (9 January 1817 – 21 October 1893) was a Norwegian businessman, consul and politician.

== Personal life ==
He was born in Stavanger to merchant and captain Andreas Sømme (1788–1853) and his wife Johanne Cathrine Kastrup (1789–June 1817).

In 1845, he married Johanne Margrethe "Hanna" Bull Kielland (1823–1908), youngest daughter of Jacob and Axeliane Christine Kielland and aunt of novelist Alexander Lange Kielland and painter Kitty Lange Kielland. The couple had three daughters and seven sons. Of these children one died young. Their most prominent child was painter Jacob Kielland Sømme.

== Career ==
Sømme started his career as a businessman as a clerk in Hamburg. In 1838 he returned to Stavanger. Having married a member of the Kielland family in 1845, he became involved in the company of his father-in-law Jacob Kielland. A ship-owner, Sømme especially concentrated on fishing and exporting atlantic herring. He was also vice consul for the Russian Empire in 1855 and the Netherlands in 1855. He was Knight of the Order of Saint Stanislaus.

Sømme was also involved in local politics, as mayor of Stavanger in 1859, 1860 and 1869.

Political offices
Preceded by Nils Fredrik Severin Thambs	Mayor of Stavanger; 1859–1860	Succeeded by Henrik Andreas Zetlitz Lassen
Preceded by Henrik Andreas Zetlitz Lassen	Mayor of Stavanger; 1869	Succeeded by Jacob Kielland
