= Ledaal =

Coordinates: 58°58′01.05″N 05°43′12.61″E

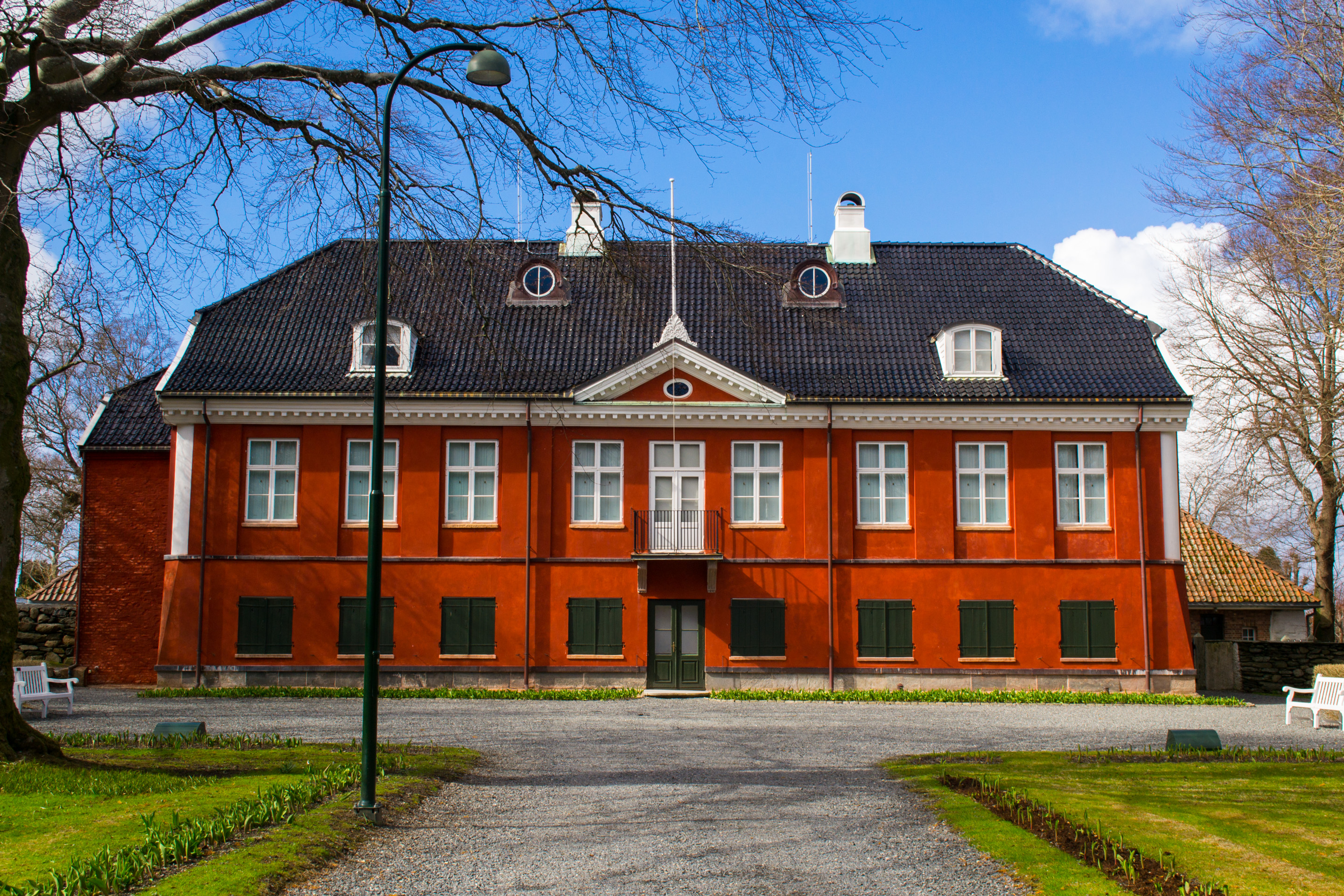
- Interactive map of the Ledaal area

General information
- Location: Stavanger, Norway
- Construction started: 1799
- Completed: 1803
- Client: Gabriel Schanche Kielland

Ledaal is a manor house which is the official residence for the King of Norway in Stavanger, Norway.

== History ==
The manor house was built between 1799 and 1803. It was then owned by the merchant and leading citizen in Stavanger, Gabriel Schanche Kielland (1760-1821). He gave the estate its present name after the last letters of his and his wife's names: Gabriel Schanche Kielland, Johanna Margaretha Bull. Ledaal was bought by Stavanger Museum in 1936. The estate is today a royal residence, a museum and the representation building of Stavanger municipality.

== In popular culture ==
In 1989 a painting of the residence was displayed at Nasjonalgalleriet as a part of the exhibition Kulturminner i norsk kunst. The painting was reviewed and commented during the opening day tour by King Olav V.
