= Hans Lindahl Falck =

Norwegian ship-owner and politician

Hans Lindahl Falck (19 March 1863 – 1937) was a Norwegian ship-owner and politician.

He was born in Stavanger as a son of Thomas Scheen Falck, Sr. (1829–1889) and Anna Lindahl (1842–1921). He was a brother of consul Christian Fredrik Falck. In 1890 he married Karen Johanne Poulsson. Their son Thomas Scheen Falck, Jr. became a notable ship-owner.

Falck took commercial education in Germany, England, France and the United States. He then started a career in the family company Ths. S. Falck in 1888, and advanced to co-owner in 1889.

== Political service ==
Falck was elected as a deputy representative to the Parliament of Norway from Stavanger og Haugesund during the term 1895–1897. He was a member of Stavanger city council for 25 years, serving as mayor for eight years. From 1890 to 1914 he also served as a consul for the German Empire. He was decorated as a Knight, First Class of the Order of St. Olav and a Knight, Fourth Class of the Order of the Red Eagle.

Political offices
| Preceded by Andreas Meling | Mayor of Stavanger; 1897–1898 | Succeeded by Arne Haabeth |
| Preceded by Arne Haabeth | Mayor of Stavanger; 1902–1907 | Succeeded by Jonas Schanche Kielland |
