= Jacob Otto Lange =

Norwegian politician

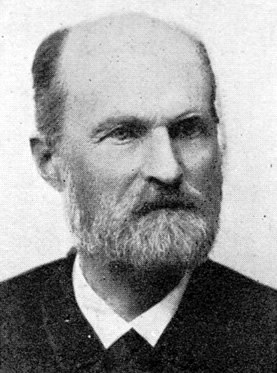
Jacob Otto Lange

Jacob Otto Lange (12 November 1833 – 26 May 1902) was a Norwegian politician.

He was born in Stavanger, Norway. He worked for the Kongsberg Silver Mines and served as mayor of Kongsberg 1875–1876. He was a member of the Norwegian Parliament as a representative from Kongsberg between 1879 and 1891. He was a member of the Council of State Division in Stockholm 1891-1892 and Minister of Auditing 1892-1893 under the government of Prime Minister Johannes Steen.
