= Erik Waaler (businessman) =

Norwegian businessman (1910–1991)

Erik Waaler (5 April 1910 – 28 March 1991) was a Norwegian shipping executive.

He was born in Kristiania as a son of Thorleif Waaler (1877–1920) and Elise Skovli (1887–1943). He finished his secondary education in 1930 and took Oslo Commerce School in 1931. In 1939 he married Ingjerd Lund Eriksen. They did not have children.

He was hired as a sub-director in Bergenske Dampskibsselskab in 1949, and was the company's chief executive officer from 1961 to 1967. There was a power struggle in the company between the "Waaler faction" and the "Falck faction", supporters of Hans L. Falck. The night before the company's stockholders' meeting in 1967, Waaler decided to retire, probably after pressure from money loaners. Falck was pressured out as well. Waaler emigrated to Indonesia, later to Switzerland, where he died in 1991.

Waaler was also a board member of Det Norske Luftfartselskap, Norsk Frysetransport and Bergens Skibsassuranceforening, and supervisory council member of Scandinavian Airlines System and Norske Assuranceunion. He was decorated as a Knight of the Order of the Crown of Belgium.

Business positions
Preceded by Thomas Scheen Falck	Chief executive of Bergenske Dampskibsselskab; 1961–1967	Succeeded by Christopher Stockinger
