= Einar Falck =

Norwegian businessman

Einar Falck (21 January 1925 – 29 October 1994) was a Norwegian businessperson.

He was born in Stavanger as a son of Einar Falck Sr. (1897–1924) and Ella Kristine Stray Johansen (1901–1933). He was a nephew of Thomas Scheen Falck. He was an orphan from age eight, and grew up with family members in Oslo and Bergen. In 1950 he married Mensendieck system teacher Sidsel Hosche Morland. In the same year he graduated from the University of Oslo with the cand.jur. degree.

After graduation, he travelled to Paris. After some years as a shipbroker there, he worked for the Council of Europe from 1952. In 1959 he became assisting director; but he left the Council of Europe in 1966. He had then started a career in the insurance company Vesta in Bergen. He was behind a merger with two other insurance companies in Bergen in 1963, Æolus and Bergen Brand, Falck was the chief executive officer of Vesta from 1968 to 1980. He was then chairman of Vesta until 1988, and also chairman of the daughter company Investa until 1993, as well as Hygea and Nevi. Vesta was sold to Skandia in 1989.

He also chaired J. Ludwig Mowinckels Rederi, A/S Aurland and Saga Petroleum. He was a board member of Vard, Elkem, Kosmos, NHH's Center for International Business, Norcem and Elektro Union. He was especially active in building up Saga Petroleum, having joined the board of the company when it was still called Norwegian Oil Consortium (Noco). He also helped found Nordenfjeldske Treforedling in 1962, which became Norske Skog. He was a supervisory council member of Bergens Privatbank and Bergen Fiskeindustrier.

Business positions
Preceded by Nicolay Aarestrup	Chief executive of Vesta; 1968–1980	Succeeded by
Preceded by	Chair of Vesta; 1980–1988	Succeeded by Jan Einar Greve
