= Nils Fredrik Severin Thambs =

Norwegian politician

Nils Fredrik Severin Thambs (1814-1885) was a Norwegian politician.

He was elected to the Norwegian Parliament in 1859, representing the constituency of Stavanger. He worked as an attorney in that city. He sat one term. On the local level he was mayor of Stavanger from 1852 to 1859.

| Preceded by Jens Jensen | Mayor of Stavanger; 1852–1859 | Succeeded by Jacob Jørgen Kastrup Sømme |
