= Leif Måsvær =

Norwegian politician (born 1941)

Leif Fritjof Måsvær (born 29 January 1941) is a Norwegian politician for the Christian Democratic Party.

He served as a deputy representative to the Norwegian Parliament from Rogaland during the term 1989–1993.

On the local level, Måsvær was mayor of Stavanger in two periods.
