= Kaare Langlete =

Norwegian military officer

Kaare Langlete (15 June 1931 – 22 June 2009) was a Norwegian military officer and royal servant.

He was born and grew up in Trondheim. He started a military career at the age of nineteen, and among others he served for the United Nations at the Suez Canal in 1957. From 1977 to 1981 he was the Chief of His Majesty The King's Guard, and from 1982 to 1990 he served as Chief of Staff of the Crown Prince couple staff (Crown Prince Harald and Crown Princess Sonja). In 1990 he became chamberlain to the Crown Prince couple.

When King Olav V died in 1991 and Harald became the new king, Langlete succeeded Ingvald M. Smith-Kielland as Lord Chamberlain, the highest administrative personnel of the Royal Court. He also organized Olav V's funeral. He retired on 1 November 1993, and was succeeded by Rear Admiral Sivert Farstad. He has been decorated with the Grand Cross of the Royal Norwegian Order of St. Olav, a rare decoration for non-royals.

Langlete has two children, and resided in Nittedal. He died in July 2009.
