= Ingvald M. Smith-Kielland =

Ingvald Mareno Smith-Kielland (20 September 1919 – 9 May 2012) was a Norwegian royal servant.

== Personal life ==
He was born in 1919. His father Ingvald Smith-Kielland served as chamberlain and court marshal from 1949 to 1955 and lord chamberlain from 1955 to 1966, under the kings Haakon VII and Olav V (from 1957). He was also the nephew of painter Per Smith-Kielland.

== Career ==
Ingvald M. Smith-Kielland was first hired in the Royal Court in 1963, as an aide-de-camp. He became court marshal in 1966, and was promoted to lord chamberlain in 1985. He succeeded Odd Grønvold in both positions. When King Olav V died in early 1991, Smith-Kielland saw the opportunity to retire and was succeeded by Kaare Langlete. In the beginning of the year, the entire court of the Norwegian royal family comprised as little as nine people: Smith-Kielland, Langlete, Gunerius Flakstad, Ingegjerd Løvenskiold, Magne Hagen and Barbara Iliff.

In June 1991 Smith-Kielland was decorated with the Grand Cross of the Royal Norwegian Order of St. Olav. In 1994, Verdens Gang noted that only seven non-royal Norwegians—all men—held the Grand Cross: Ingvald M. Smith-Kielland, Folke Hauger Johannessen, Herman Fredrik Zeiner-Gundersen, Rolv Ryssdal, Thor Heyerdahl, Per Aabel and Helge Ingstad. Smith-Kielland's father, who died in 1984, also received the Grand Cross. Ingvald M. Smith-Kielland died in May 2012.
