= Poison (Kielland novel) =

1883 novel by Alexander Kielland

- Author: Alexander Kielland
- Original title: Gift
- Language: Norwegian
- Genre: Novel
- Publisher: Gyldendal
- Publication date: 1883
- Publication place: Norway
- Media type: Print (Hardback)
- Followed by: Fortuna

Poison (original Norwegian title: Gift) is an 1883 novel by the Norwegian writer Alexander Kielland. The novel is the first in a trilogy including Fortuna (1884) and St. Hans Fest (1887).

This famous novel is an attack on the Norwegian education system, particularly on the obsession with Latin. A schoolboy, Little Marius, is tormented throughout the first half of the novel by his scholastic inability. He is the son of "Mrs. Gottwald," who had him out of wedlock. The fact that "Mrs. Gottwald" had her son "Little Marius" outside of marriage attaches an unspoken stigma to both her and her son—Little Marius is perceived as "illegitimate." However, out of sheer politeness and pity, the other townspeople still refer to his mother as "Mrs.," a title typically reserved for married and "respectable" women. Although Little Marius has a lower social status, he is allowed to attend school with the children from the town's respectable upper class. Little Marius, who is small in stature and not particularly intelligent, performs poorly in all subjects except one: rote-learning in Latin. During his final illness he continues to murmur rote phrases, his last words being Mensa rotunda.

The main character of the book is Little Marius's friend Abraham Løvdahl, the son of a respected professor. His mother Wenche is an idealist who struggles in vain to keep her son honest and upright; she takes her own life after falling pregnant to the businessman Michal Mordtmann.

Alexander Kielland chose to title his book Gift (poison) in response to a critic. One of his previous books, Else, en Julefortælling, had been sold under the pretext of being a pleasant, family-friendly Christmas book, when in reality, it was highly naturalistic and deemed as inappropriate for children, as it discussed things such as extreme poverty, sexual abuse, abuse of power, and alcoholism. As such, a critic had written that Alexander Kielland snuck "poison" into the homes of the gullible families, a criticism that was not without some truth to it. Thus Kielland decided to call the novel Gift, so that his critic could not claim he had not warned his audience. It is a common misconception that the title is intended to carry a double meaning, as the Norwegian word for "poison" is the same as the word for "married".
