= Robert Kloster =

Norwegian museum director and art historian (1905–1979)

Robert Kloster (8 March 1905 – 7 February 1979) was a Norwegian museum director and art historian.

== Family ==
He was born in Bergen as a son of physician Robert Emil Kloster (1873–1947) and Alette "Ada" Falsen Wiesener (1873–1948).

In April 1932, he married Wibecke Trane Kielland (1902–1992)in Paris. She was the daughter of Jonas Schanche Kielland and the sister of Thor Bendz Kielland.

== Career ==
He finished his secondary education in 1924, and graduated with a mag.art. degree (PhD equivalent) from the University of Oslo in 1929. He began working at Stavanger Museum in 1929 and then joined the department of cultural history at Bergen Museum in 1932. He took the doctorate in 1943 with the thesis Snekkerhåndverket i Bergen under renessansen. He was the museum director of Vestlandske Kunstindustrimuseum from 1949 to 1964. He also chaired the organization Norske Museers Landsforbund, a forerunner of Norges Museumsforbund, from 1949 to 1957, and led the Society for the Preservation of Ancient Norwegian Monuments in Bergen from 1949 to 1960. In 1964, he became a professor at the University of Bergen, a position he held until his retirement.

He became a member of the Norwegian Academy of Science and Letters in 1948, and held an honorary degree from the University of Aberdeen. From 1965 to 1976, he served as the praeses of Det nyttige Selskab . He was decorated as a Knight, First Class of the Royal Norwegian Order of St. Olav in 1954, and as a Knight of the Icelandic Order of the Falcon, as well as being made a Chevalier of the French Legion of Honour.

Cultural offices
Preceded by Einar Lexow	Director of Vestlandske Kunstindustrimuseum; 1949–1964	Succeeded by Peter Anker
