= Henrik Andreas Zetlitz Lassen =

Norwegian politician

Henrik Andreas Zetlitz Lassen (4 March 1818 - 6 January 1890) was a Norwegian politician.

He was elected to the Norwegian Parliament in 1862 and 1865, representing the constituency of Stavanger. He worked as a physician in that city. In 1874 he was deputy representative.

On the local level he was mayor of Stavanger for three terms.

Preceded by Jacob Jørgen Kastrup Sømme	Mayor of Stavanger; 1861–1862	Succeeded by Andreas Høy
Preceded by Andreas Høy	Mayor of Stavanger; 1864–1865	Succeeded by Lauritz Wilhelm Hansen
Preceded by Lauritz Wilhelm Hansen	Mayor of Stavanger; 1867–1868	Succeeded by Jacob Jørgen Kastrup Sømme
