= Jacob Kielland (officer) =

Norwegian naval officer and politician (1825–1889)

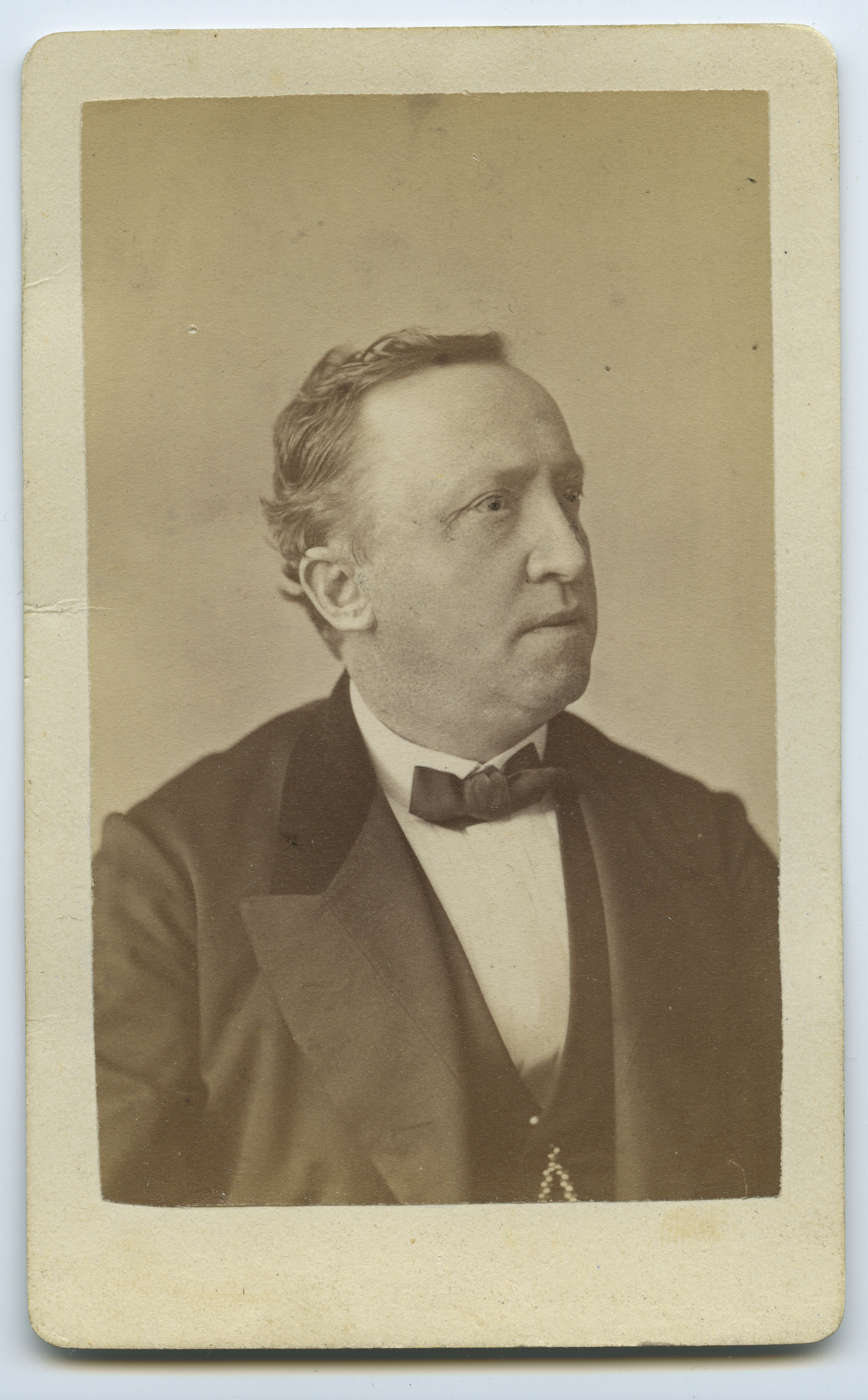
Jacob Kielland

Jacob Kielland (17 November 1825 – 19 October 1889) was a Norwegian naval officer and politician, particularly associated with Stavanger.

== Family ==
Jacob Kielland was a member of the prominent family of Kielland. He was born in Stavanger to Jacob Kielland and Axeliane Christine (1792–1855), née Zetlitz. His grandfather was Gabriel Schanche Kielland, his uncle Jonas Schanche Kielland. He had four brothers and five sisters, most of them older than he was, even though a few died young. Through his brother Jens Zetlitz Kielland, Jacob Kielland had a nephew Alexander Lange Kielland who became one of the most prominent novelists in Norwegian history.

In March 1849 Jacob Kielland married Thora Margrethe Bendz, daughter of Christian Ahle Bendz (1790–1867) and his wife Frederikke Magdalene (1799–1837) in Fredriksværn. They had five sons and one daughter. One son, Christian Bendz Kielland (1851-1855), died in childhood; he was remembered by giving his name to another son, born subsequently.

- Axel Christian Zetlitz Kielland, a leading jurist
- Jonas Schancke Kielland, politician
- Christian Bendz Kielland, namesake of the deceased brother, a high-ranking civil servant

== Career ==
Jacob Kielland started his career in the navy. He was ranked cadet in 1838, sub-lieutenant in 1844, and premier lieutenant in 1856. He had been based in Fredriksværn and Horten, but inherited a third of Ledaal farm in 1863. In 1866 he retired from the navy with the rank of lieutenant captain (lieutenant-commander). He started working with agriculture and gardening.

He was mayor of Stavanger from 1870 to 1871. He was elected to the Norwegian Parliament in 1874, representing the constituency of Stavanger. He had also served as a deputy representative during the term 1871–1873. He was politically conservative.

He died in 1889 in Stavanger.

Preceded by Jacob Jørgen Kastrup Sømme	Mayor of Stavanger; 1870–1871	Succeeded by Johannes Steen
