= Jonas Schanche Kielland =

Norwegian consul and politician (1791–1852)

Jonas Schanche Kielland (11 July 1791 – 3 July 1852) was a Norwegian consul and politician, particularly associated with Stavanger.

== Family ==
Jonas Schanche Kielland was a member of the prominent Stavanger family of Kielland. He was born in Stavanger to Gabriel Schanche Kielland (1760–1821) and Johanna Margaretha Kielland (1756–1818). He had three older brothers and two older sisters, but his youngest sister Elisabeth only survived for a month, and the oldest brother Jacob died at the age of 1. Another brother named Jacob Kielland would become a wealthy businessman, Jens Bull Kielland became a military officer.

The prominent novelist Alexander Lange Kielland was his grandnephew, as was his namesake, the politician Jonas Schanche Kielland.

== Career ==
Jonas Schanche Kielland graduated as cand.jur. in Copenhagen in 1809. During his time as student he was a member of The Norwegian Society. In 1817 he started working in his father's merchant company "Jacob Kielland & Søn". He passed a business exam in 1821, and as his father died the same year, Jonas took over as director of the company together with his brother Jacob. Jonas Schanche Kielland was vice consul for Denmark in 1820, Great Britain in 1821, and the Russian Empire in 1821.

He was the first mayor of Stavanger, being elected in 1837 when local government was introduced in Norway. He later sat a second term. He was elected to the Norwegian Parliament in 1839, representing the constituency of Stavanger. He sat through one term.

From 1845 he worked as the public trustee. He died in 1852 in Stavanger.

Political offices
Preceded by position created	Mayor of Stavanger; 1837–1838	Succeeded by Ole Helliesen
Preceded by Mathias Wilhelm Eckhoff	Mayor of Stavanger; 1841–1842	Succeeded by Magnus Andreas Gjør
