= Per Smith-Kielland =

Norwegian painter (1891–1921)

Per Axel Smith-Kielland (19 September 1891 – 24 September 1921) was a Norwegian painter.

He was born in Kristiania, and was a brother of diplomat Ingvald Smith-Kielland. He studied under Christian Krohg at the Norwegian National Academy of Fine Arts from 1914 to 1915, and became an accomplished painter, but fell ill as early as 1918, and died in his thirtieth year. He is represented with four works in the National Gallery of Norway.
