= The Four Greats (Norwegian writers) =

Four influential Norwegian writers

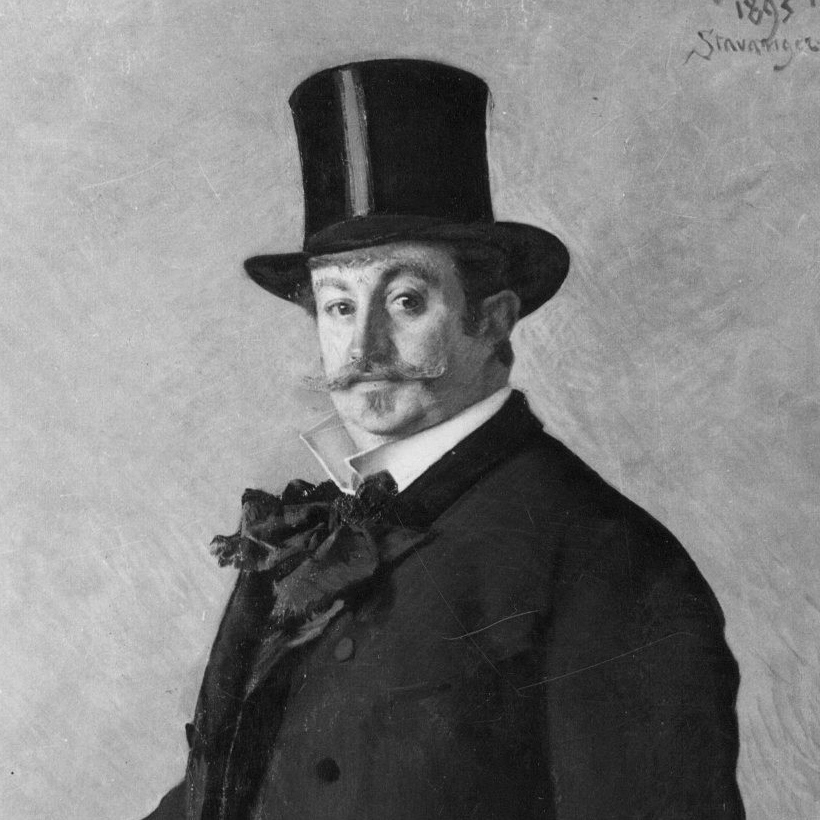
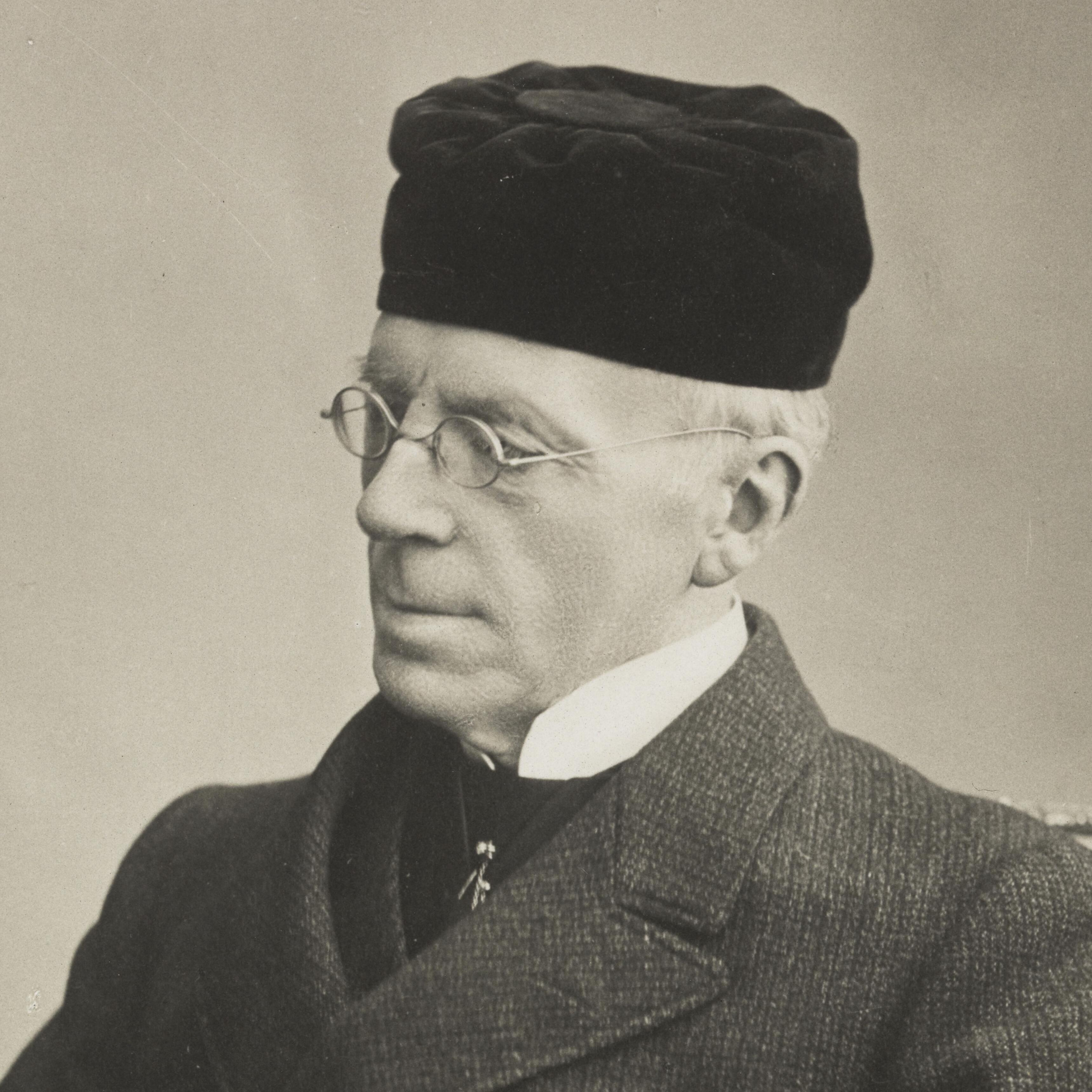
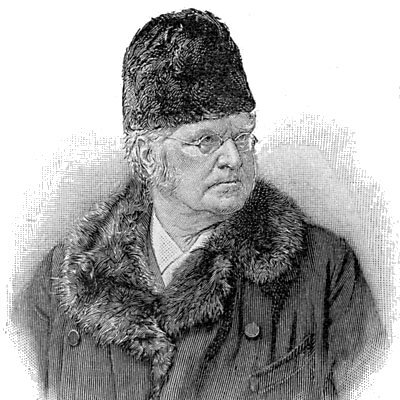
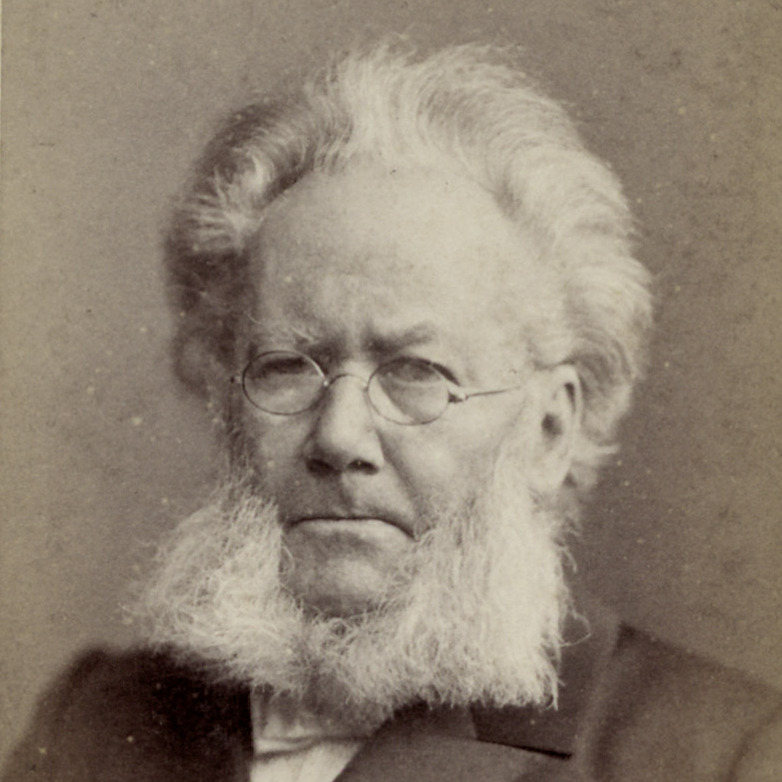
The Four Greats. Clockwise from top left: Kielland, Lie, Ibsen, and Bjørnson.

The Four Greats (Danish and Norwegian: De fire store) is a term used for four of the most influential Norwegian writers of the late 19th century.

The Four Greats were:

- Henrik Ibsen (1828–1906) playwright, theatre director, and poet who introduced Theatrical realism to the Norwegian stage.
- Bjørnstjerne Bjørnson (1832–1910) novelist, dramatist and playwright who became the first Norwegian Nobel laureate.
- Jonas Lie (1833–1908) novelist, poet, and playwright focusing largely on the folk life and social spirit of the nation of Norway.
- Alexander Kielland (1849–1906) novelist, short story writer, playwright, essayist most known for his satirical writings and short stories.

Names of other influential writers have been suggested, notably Amalie Skram.

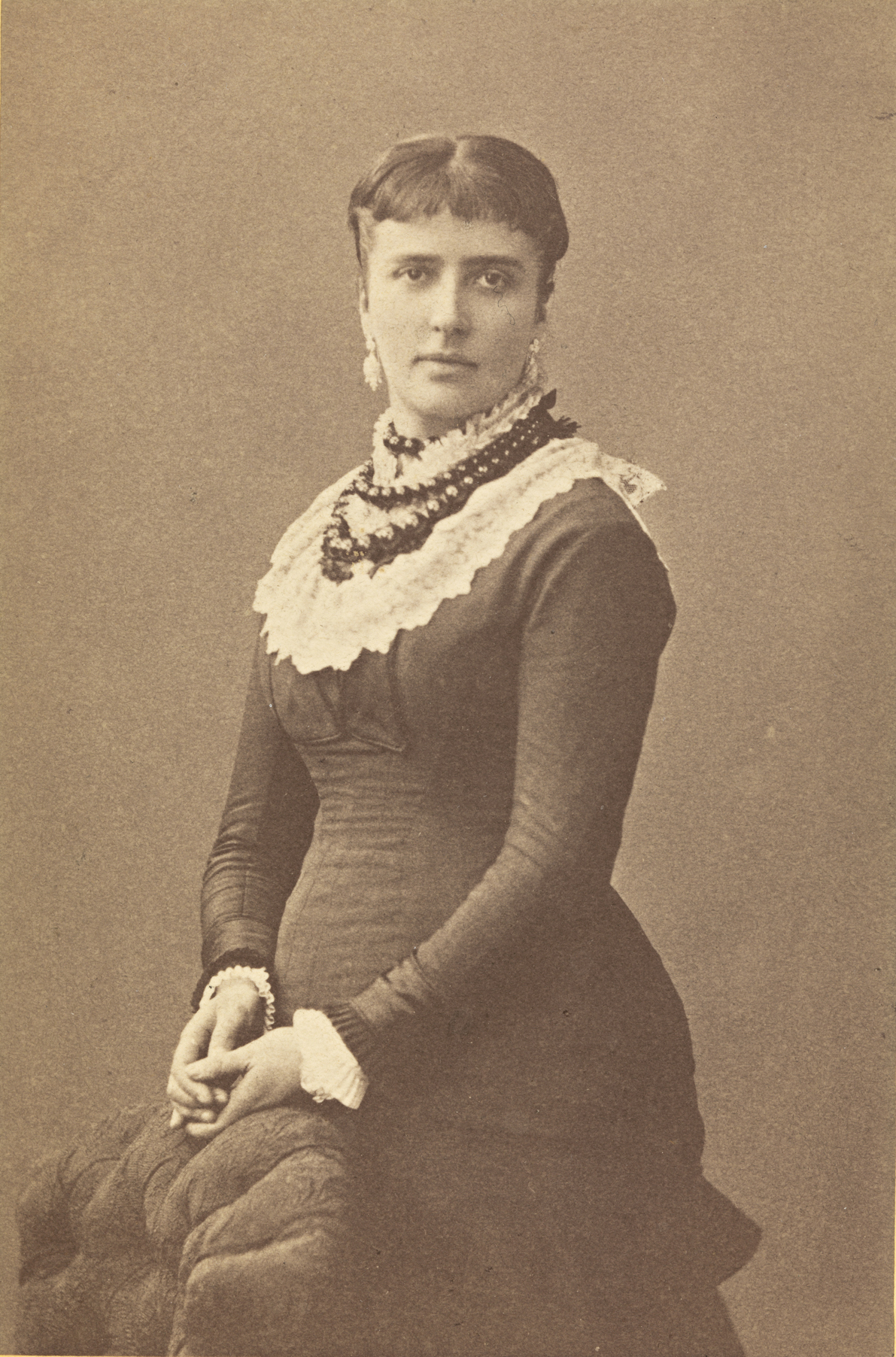
Amalie Skram, whose name has also been suggested as one of the greats

Originally a publicity gimmick introduced by their publisher, Gyldendal, the term stuck and is still widely used. The four authors had in common that they to some extent belonged to the same generation and were influential in literary realism within Norway during the period 1860–1890. Additionally Bjørnson, Ibsen and Lie all attended the same school, Heltberg Latin School (Heltbergs Studentfabrikk) in Christiania (now Oslo), where they were taught by Henrik Heltberg (1806–1873).

== Related reading ==
- Beyer, Harald; translation by Einar Haugen (1979) A History of Norwegian Literature (New York University Press) ISBN 978-0-8147-1023-4
- Naess, Harald S. (1993) A History of Norwegian Literature (University of Nebraska Press) ISBN 978-0-8032-3317-1
