= Jacob Kielland (businessman) =

Norwegian businessperson, consul and politician (1788–1863)

Jacob Kielland (14 December 1788 – 6 August 1863) was a Norwegian businessperson, consul and politician.

== Family ==
Jacob Kielland was a member of the prominent family of Kielland. He was born in Stavanger to Gabriel Schanche Kielland (1760–1821) and his wife Johanna Margaretha (1756–1818), née Bull. He had three older and two younger siblings, but his youngest sister Elisabeth only survived for a month, and the oldest brother Jacob died at the age of 1. His oldest living brother Jens Bull Kielland became a military officer, and his youngest brother Jonas Schanche Kielland became a politician.

Jacob Kielland married Axeliane Christine Zetlitz (1792–1855), daughter of the priest and poet Jens Zetlitz. The couple had five sons and five daughters. Of these children, four died young. Those who survived included:

- Jens Zetlitz Kielland, consul and artist, and father of several notable people, including:
  - Alexander Lange Kielland, the well-known De Fire Store writer
  - Kitty Lange Kielland, painter
- Jacob Kielland, naval officer and politician, and father of several notable people, including:
  - Axel Christian Zetlitz Kielland, diplomat
  - Jonas Schanche Kielland, politician.
- Axel Christian Kielland, youngest living son, and father of:
  - Valentin Axel Kielland, sculptor
- Maren Elisabeth Bull Kielland, eldest daughter, wife of military officer Ingvald Maryllus Emil Smith and mother of:
  - Ingvald M. Smith-Kielland.
- Johanne (Hanna) Margrethe Bull Kielland, youngest daughter, wife of businessman and politician Jacob Jørgen Kastrup Sømme and mother of ten children, including:
  - Andreas Sømme, businessman and, in turn, father of:
    - Axel Christian Zetlitz Sømme, geographer
    - Jacob Kielland Sømme, painter

== Career ==
Jacob Kielland took education from 1802 to 1806, and after that started working in his father's company "Jacob Kielland & Søn". As his father died in 1821, Jacob and Jonas Schanche Kielland took over the company. Jacob Kielland acquired burghership in June 1821. The trade company mainly exported timber, lobsters and atlantic herring. Like many traders they were also involved in shipbuilding, running two shipyards.

Jacob Kielland was also vice consul for the Netherlands in 1815, Hamburg and Prussia in 1821 and the United States in 1830. The latter relation was broken in 1863, shortly before his death. Kielland was also involved in local politics, as a member of Stavanger city council.

His brother and business partner Jonas Schanche Kielland died unmarried in 1852, with Jacob as his sole heir. Jacob Kielland was, upon his death in 1863, one of the richest people in Norway.
