= Jonas Schanche Kielland (born 1863) =

Norwegian judge and politician (1863–1925)

Jonas Schanche Kielland (20 November 1863 – 1 June 1925) was a Norwegian judge and politician.

== Family ==
He was born in Horten to Jacob Kielland and his wife Thora Margrethe (1827–1902), née Bendz. His grandfather was Jacob Kielland, his uncle Jens Zetlitz Kielland and his cousins Kitty Lange and Alexander Kielland. Jonas Schancke Kielland had four older brothers, one of whom died young, and one older sister. His brother Axel Christian Zetlitz Kielland became a diplomat, and another brother Christian Bendz Kielland became a high-ranking civil servant.

In 1893 Jonas Schanche Kielland married Helene Christiane Lorange (1868–1925). The couple had two sons a one daughter:

- Wibeke Trane Kielland, daughter: wife of museum director Robert Kloster
- Thor Bendz Kielland, son: director of the Norwegian Museum of Decorative Arts and Design from 1928 to 1960

== Career ==
He enrolled in law studies in 1881, and graduated with the cand.jur. degree in 1886. From 1889 to 1910 he worked as an attorney in Stavanger. He rose in the hierarchy to become a judge in 1917 and stipendiary magistrate (byfogd) of Stavanger in 1919.

As a politician, he represented the Conservative Party and was first elected to the municipal council of Stavanger Municipality in 1902. He was later mayor of Stavanger from 1908 to 1909. He was elected to the Parliament of Norway in the 1909 Norwegian parliamentary election, but after one year of the three-year term he relinquished his seat because of illness. In 1911 he became burgomaster of Stavanger, a position his cousin Alexander Kielland had held from 1891 to 1902.

Political offices
Preceded by Hans Lindahl Falck	Mayor of Stavanger; 1908–1909	Succeeded by Kristoffer Bertram Louis Berg
