= Johannes Steen =

Norwegian politician

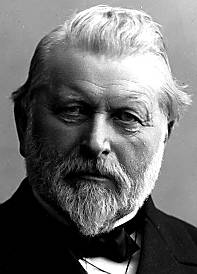
- Johannes Steen

Prime Minister of Norway
- In office 17 February 1898 – 21 April 1902
- Monarch: Oscar II
- Preceded by: Francis Hagerup
- Succeeded by: Otto Blehr
- In office 6 March 1891 – 2 May 1893
- Monarch: Oscar II
- Preceded by: Emil Stang
- Succeeded by: Emil Stang

Minister of the Interior
- In office 24 March 1900 – 21 April 1902
- Prime Minister: Himself
- Preceded by: Ole Anton Qvam
- Succeeded by: Otto Blehr

Minister of Finance
- In office 6 March 1891 – 2 May 1893
- Prime Minister: Himself
- Preceded by: Evald Rygh
- Succeeded by: Ole Furu

Personal details
- Born: Johannes Wilhelm Christian Steen; 22 July 1827 Christiania, United Kingdoms of Sweden and Norway
- Died: 1 April 1906 (aged 78) Voss, Søndre Bergenhus, Norway
- Party: Liberal
- Spouse: Elise Henriette Stoltenberg (m. 1849)

Johannes Wilhelm Christian Steen (22 July 1827 – 1 April 1906) was a Norwegian statesman and educator who served as the prime minister of Norway from 1891 to 1893 and from 1898 to 1902.

== Background ==
He was born in Christiania (now Oslo, Norway). He grew up in Vesteraalen as the son of John Svaboe Steen (1798– 1872), a judge and member of Parliament, and Christine Fleischer (1805–1851). His brother Frederik Steen was also a member of Parliament.

He took his examen artium at Tromsø in 1844. From 1844, he was a student at the University of Christiania and received his cand.philol. in 1848. Over the next 42 years, Steen combined his profession as teacher and educationist with a political career. He served as a teacher in Bergen (1850–55) and Tromsø (1855–1866). He was mayor of Tromsø (1856–1862) and (1864–1866). From 1866 he was Rector of Stavanger Cathedral School.

== Career ==
Steen was mayor of Stavanger (1872–1883) and (1885–1890). In 1859 he was first elected member of the Storting for Tromsø. In 1868, Steen was elected to the Storting for Stavanger. From 1871, the Storting became increasingly marked by political debate and struggle between liberal and conservative forces. Steen first served as the President of the lower house (Odelstinget) 1871–1873 and 1877–1881. He served as Prime Minister of Norway for two terms. Steen first became Prime Minister from 6 March 1891 – 2 May 1893. In 1894, Steen was re-elected to the Storting from Trondheim. Steen became Prime Minister again from 17 February 1898 – 21 April 1902.

Steen's final administration was responsible for the 1902 Land Sales Act, which limited the buying or leasing of state-owned land to fluent Norwegian speakers, barring the Saami people from the purchase of their traditional hunting and grazing grounds.

In 1884 he was a co-founder of the Norwegian Association for Women's Rights.

== Personal life ==
He was married in 1849 to Elise Henriette Stoltenberg (1826–1896). He was made a Knight in the Order of St Olav in 1887. He died in 1906 in Voss Municipality in Søndre Bergenhus county and was buried at Vår Frelsers gravlund in Kristiania.

Political offices
Preceded by Emil Stang	Prime Minister of Norway; 1891–1893	Succeeded by Emil Stang
Preceded by Francis Hagerup	Prime Minister of Norway; 1898–1902	Succeeded by Otto Albert Blehr
