= Axel Christian Zetlitz Kielland =

Norwegian civil servant (1853–1924)

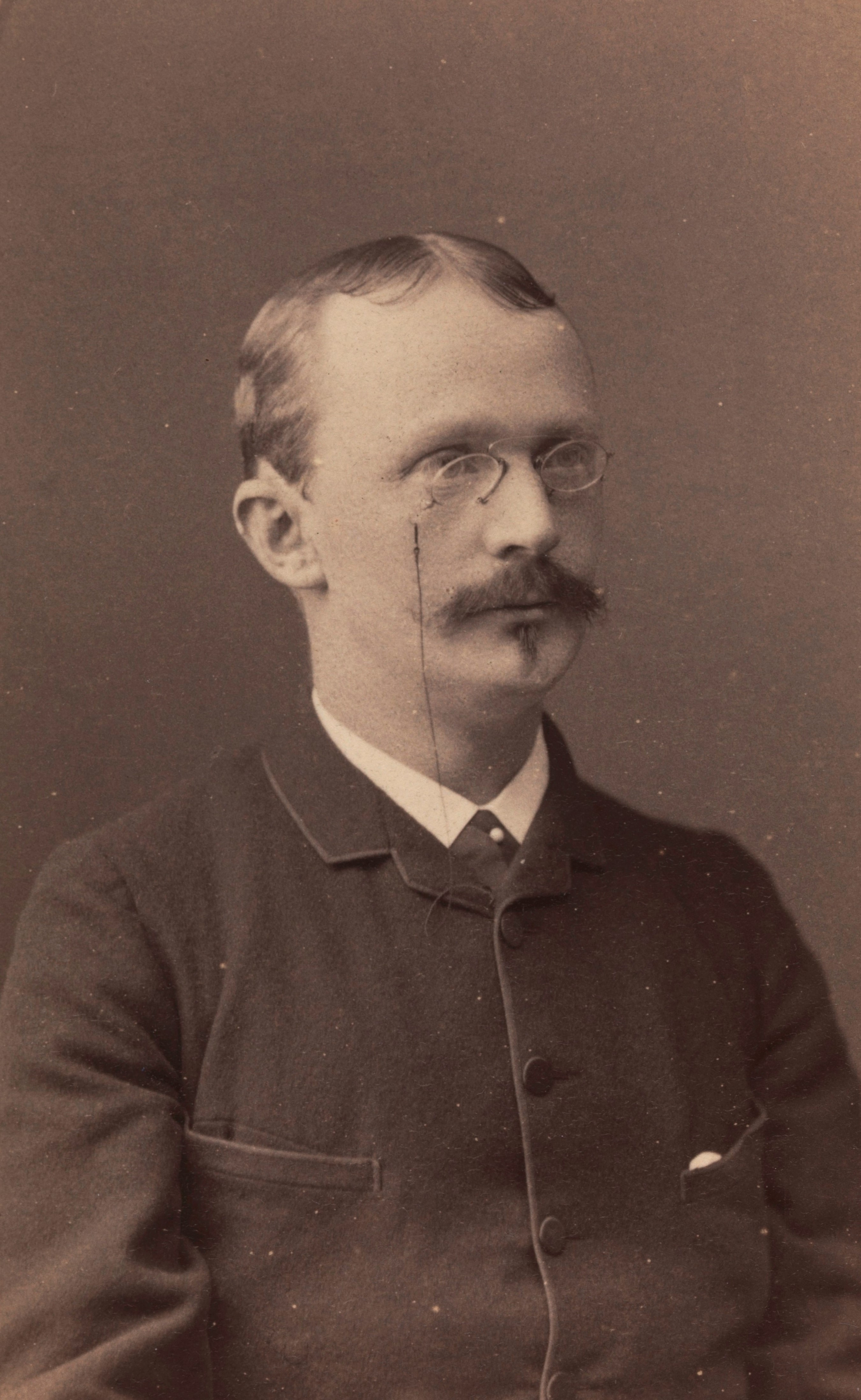

Axel Christian Zetlitz Kielland (14 October 1853 – 3 February 1924) was a Norwegian civil servant and Ministry of Foreign Affairs mandarin.

== Family ==
He was born in Stavanger to Jacob Kielland and Thora Margrethe (1827–1902), née Bendz. His grandfather was Jacob Kielland, his uncle Jens Zetlitz Kielland and his cousins Kitty Lange and Alexander Kielland. Axel Christian Zetlitz Kielland had two older brothers, one of whom died young, and three younger siblings. His brother Jonas Schancke Kielland became a politician, and another brother Christian Bendz Kielland became a high-ranking civil servant.

== Career ==
He enrolled in law studies in 1871, and graduated as cand.jur. in 1876. He began his career first in the Ministry of Justice and the Police in 1878 and then in the Ministry of the Interior from 1881. In 1899, he was promoted to assistant secretary in the Ministry of Foreign Affairs and in 1906, he became acting deputy under-secretary of State. He was then appointed secretary in the Supreme Court in 1909. He was also a Camerlengo, from 1903.

Through his service, he had been bestowed the following titles:

- Knight of the Royal Norwegian Order of St. Olav
- Knight of the Order of Leopold
- Commandeur of the Légion d'honneur
- Grand Officer of the Order of the Crown of Italy
- Knight of the Order of the Crown of Prussia, 2nd Class
- Commander of the Order of Isabel the Catholic
- Knight of the Order of the Polar Star
- Knight of the Order of Vasa

He retired in 1920, and died in 1924 in Kristiania.
