= Jens Zetlitz Kielland =

Norwegian consul and artist (1816–1881)

Jens Zetlitz Kielland (Jan 05, 1816–Jan 07, 1881) was a Norwegian consul and artist. He is known as the father of novelist Alexander Kielland.

== Family ==
Jens Kielland was a member of the prominent family of Kielland. He was born in Stavanger to Jacob Kielland and Axeliane Christine (1792–1855), née Zetlitz. His grandfather was Gabriel Schanche Kielland, his uncle Jonas Schanche Kielland. He had four brothers and five sisters, most of them younger than he was, although a few died young. Through his brother Jacob Kielland, Jens Zetlitz Kielland had several notable nephews.

In July 1840, he married fellow Stavanger citizen Christiane ("Janna") Lange, daughter of Alexander Lange (1792–1866) and his wife Christine Aall Castberg (1799–1851). The couple had five sons and three daughters, of whom two died young.

- Jacob Kielland, priest and politician
- Kitty Kielland, painter
- Alexander Kielland, the well-known De Fire Store novelist
- Tycho Kielland became a jurist and journalist

Janna died after giving birth to the eighth child

In July 1863, Jens Zetlitz Kielland married Inger Mæle (1815–1887). They had no children.

Jens Zetlitz Kielland died in 1881 in Stavanger.

== Career ==
Jens Zetzlitz Kielland was qualified for university, but did not take to his studies and returned home to work in his father's business. He did not take to business either, but did serve as the vice consul for Portugal from 1837 and as a director of the Stavanger Sparebank. He inherited a third share in the Ledaal estate in 1863.

His interests lay in the creative side, in painting, music and ivory carving.
