= Alexander Kielland =

Norwegian realist writer (1849–1906)

Alexander L. Kielland
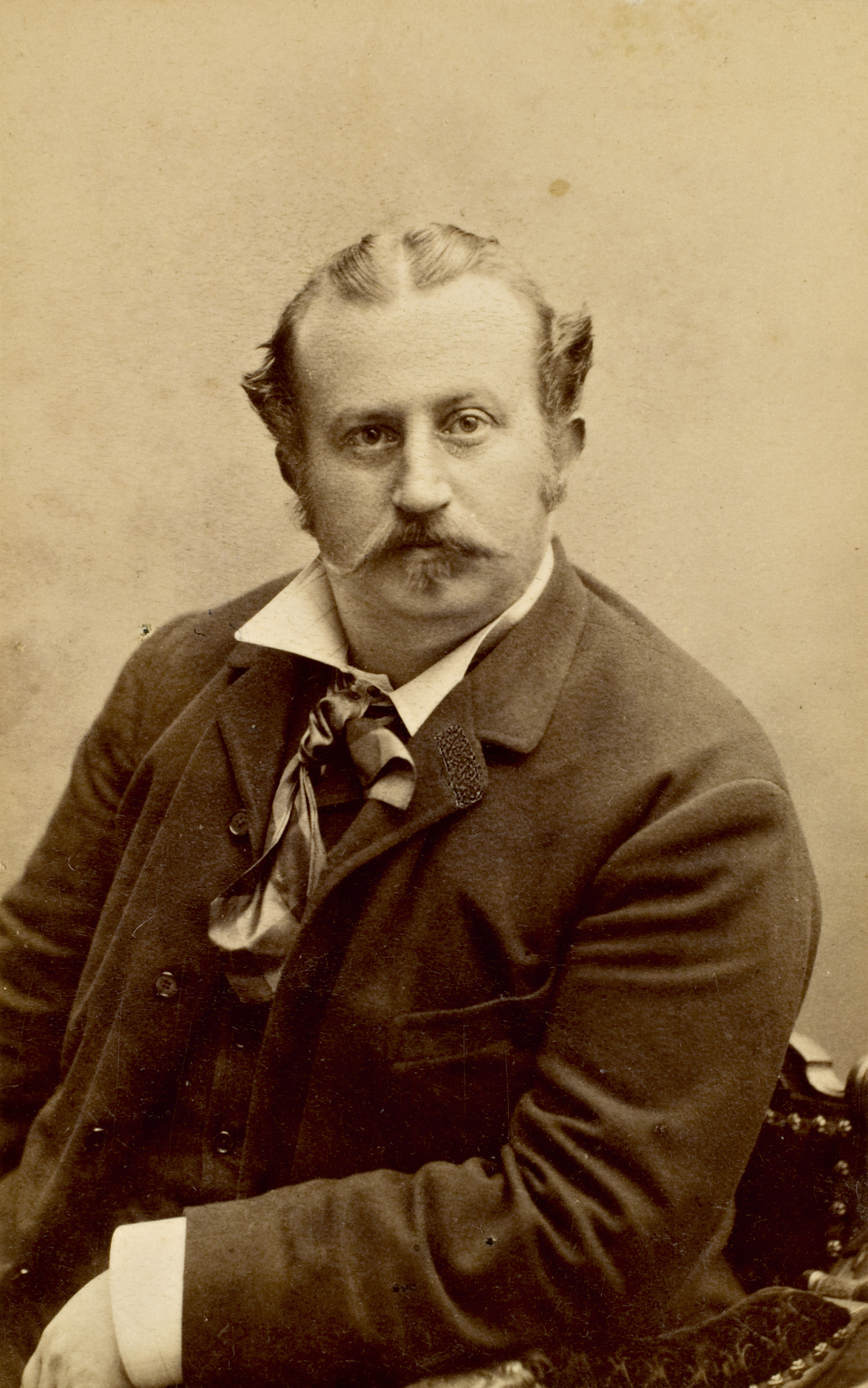
- Kielland in later years
- Born: Alexander Lange Kielland; 18 February 1849; Stavanger, Norway
- Died: 6 April 1906 (aged 57); Bergen, Norway
- Occupations: Novelist, short story writer, playwright, essayist, businessman, and politician.
- Writing career
- Movement: Realism

Alexander Lange Kielland (Norwegian: [ɑɫɛˈksɑ̀ndər ˈlɑ̂ŋːə ˈçɛ̂lːɑn]; 18 February 1849 – 6 April 1906) was a Norwegian realist writer of the 19th century. He is considered one of "the Four Greats" of Norwegian literature, along with Henrik Ibsen, Bjørnstjerne Bjørnson and Jonas Lie.

== Background ==
Born in Stavanger, Norway, he grew up in a rich merchant family. He was the son of consul Jens Zetlitz Kielland and great-grandson of Gabriel Schanche Kielland (1760–1821). Kielland was the younger brother of Norwegian landscape painter Kitty Lange Kielland.

His family also included his son, Jens Zetlitz Kielland, (1873–1926); uncle Jacob Otto Lange (1833–1902), cousin Axel Christian Zetlitz Kielland (1853–1924), nephew Jens Zetlitz Monrad Kielland (1866–1926), cousin Anders Lange (1904–1974) and great nephew Jacob Christie Kielland (1897–1972). His great niece Axeliane Christiane Zetlitz Kielland (1916–1995) married Agnar Mykle (1915–1994).

== Career ==
Despite being born wealthy, he had a sincere affection for the less fortunate, treating his workers well when he was a factory owner. He remained a spokesman for the weak and a critic of society throughout his time as a writer. His best known plays were the satirical comedies Tre Par (1886) and Professoren (1888). He was also well known for his short stories.

Among his most famous works are the novels Gift (1883), Skipper Worse (1882) and Garman & Worse (1880). Gift (published in English as Poison) is the first of a trilogy including Fortuna (1884) and St. Hans Fest (1887). In this trilogy, Kielland satirizes the hypocrisy of Norway's clergy. In Gift, Kielland debates the preference for Latin that Norwegian teachers had during his time. The story features a young boy called Marius, lying on his deathbed while repeating Latin grammar.

From 1889 to 1890, Kielland worked as a journalist for the newspaper Stavanger Avis. Kielland virtually stopped writing fiction in 1891 and published only stories which had been published earlier. In 1891 he was designated the mayor of Stavanger Municipality (his hometown), until 1902 when he relocated to Molde as governor of the Møre og Romsdal county.

It has been debated why Kielland ended his career as a writer so early. Some believe that he was so much of a realist that he could not deal with the neo-romantic tendencies of Norwegian literature at the end of the 19th century. A more probable reason is that he chose to focus on his political career.

The biography of Alexander L. Kielland by Tor Obrestad includes thoughts about Kielland dying from obesity. Already from the mid-1880s, Kielland had suffered from shortness of breath. He had several heart attacks, constantly gained weight, and couldn't control his great passion for food.

== Publications ==
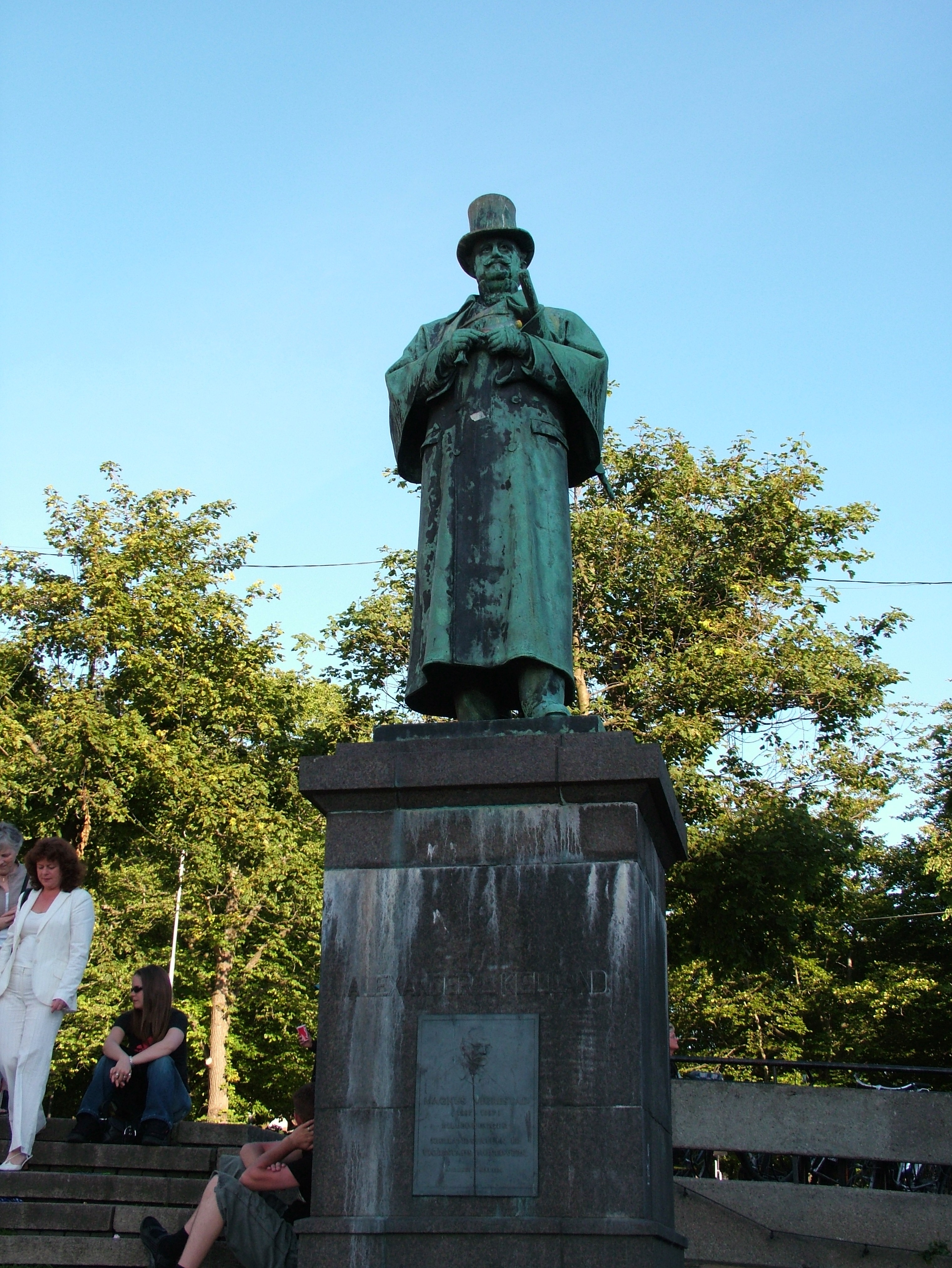
Statue of Alexander Kielland in Stavanger

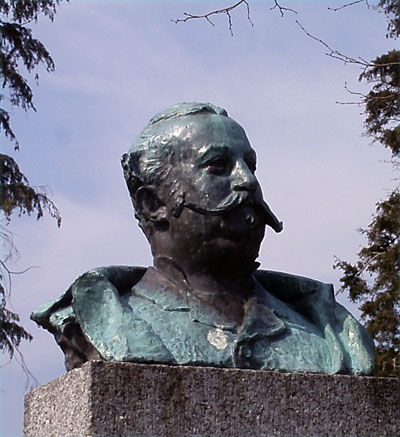
Bust of Alexander Kielland in Reknes Park in Molde

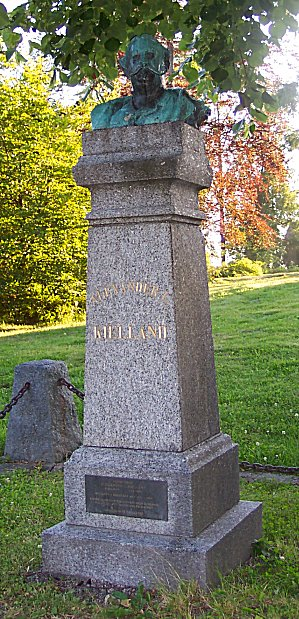
Sculpture of Alexander Kielland in Reknes Park in Molde.

=== Short stories ===
- Novelletter, 1879
- Nye novelletter, 1880
- To Novelletter fra Danmark, 1882
- A Dinner, 1896 (as a part of Norse Tales and Sketches)

=== Novels ===
- Garman & Worse, 1880
- Arbeidsfolk, 1881
- Else, 1881
- Skipper Worse, 1882.
- Gift, 1883
- Fortuna, 1884
- Sne, 1886
- Sankt Hans Fest, 1887
- Jacob, 1891

=== Plays ===
- Paa Hjemvejen, 1878
- Hans Majestæts Foged, 1880
- Det hele er Ingenting, 1880
- Tre par, 1886
- Bettys Formynder, 1887
- Professoren, 1888

=== Essays ===
- Forsvarssagen, 1890
- Menneker og Dyr, 1891
- Omkring Napoleon, 1905

Government offices
Preceded by Ludvig Arnoldus Leth	County Governor of Møre og Romsdal; 1902–1906	Succeeded by Birger Kildal
