= Kitty Kielland =

Norwegian artist (1843–1914)

Kitty Lange Kielland
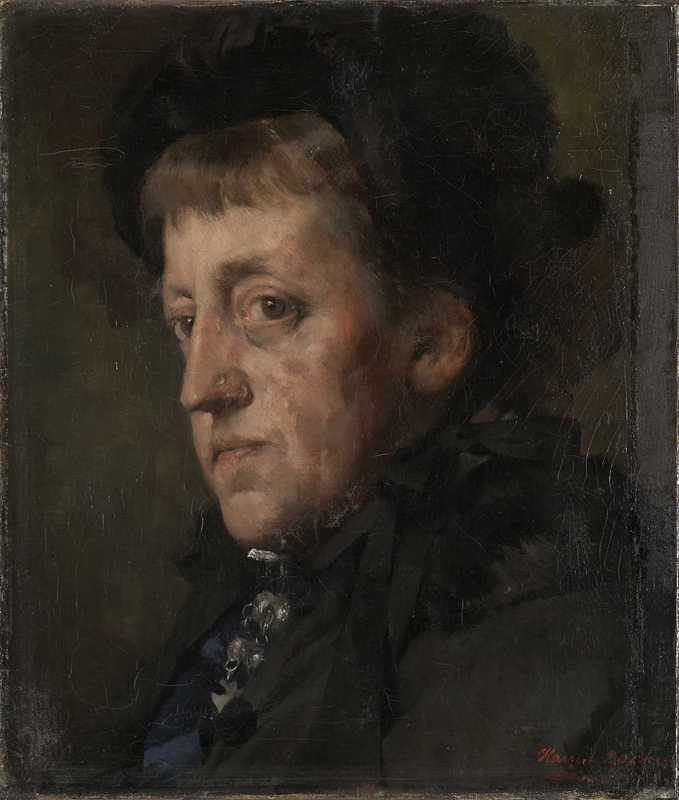
- Portrait by Harriet Backer (1880)
- Born: 8 October 1843; Stavanger, Norway
- Died: 1 October 1914 (aged 70); Kristiania, Norway
- Education: Hans Gude; Hermann Baisch; Eilif Peterssen; Léon Pelouse

Kitty Lange Kielland (8 October 1843 – 1 October 1914) was a Norwegian landscape painter.

== Early life and training ==
Kielland was born to an affluent family in Stavanger, the older sister of Alexander Kielland. Kielland's interactions with her brother were important in her development as an artist. Although she received some training in drawing and painting, it was not until she turned thirty that she was allowed to train as a professional artist. In 1873 she traveled to Karlsruhe where she was trained by Hans Gude. As a woman, Kielland was forced to take private lessons from Gude instead of joining his landscape painting class. Gude's adherence to realism left a lasting impression on Kielland that was visible in her later works. Kielland made rapid progress during the two years she spent training with Gude.

== Munich ==
Kielland left Karlsruhe for Munich in 1875 where she joined a colony of Norwegian artists living there. In Munich she studied with French-inspired realist Hermann Baisch, and with Norwegian Eilif Peterssen whom some consider to be her most important teacher. Kielland lived in Munich until 1878. She then moved to Paris, where she continued painting daily.

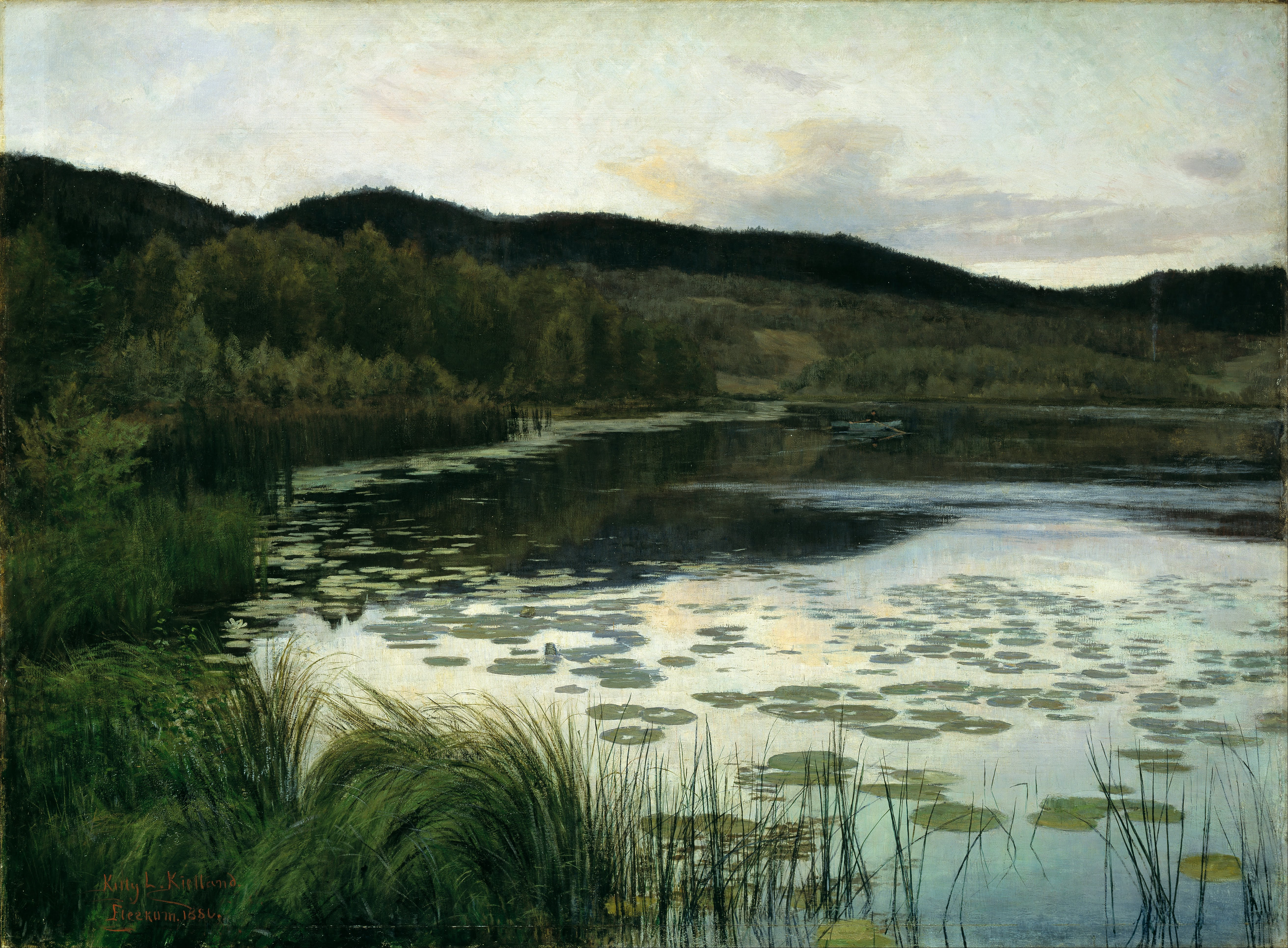
Sommernatt, 1886

== Jæren ==
In 1876, Kielland visited Jæren in southern Norway. Kielland's former teacher Hans Gude had visited Jæren in 1869 and 1872 and upon his return had suggested to her that she should travel there and paint it.

Kielland prepared studies while she was in Jæren and later used these to paint the characteristically flat landscape when she returned to Munich, making her the first artist to do so. Her painting of Jæren shows a realistic depiction of the landscape, but with unifying atmospheric effects. Kielland returned to Jæren regularly during the summers, and so the monotonous landscape and peat bogs of the area became one of her favorite motifs. Kielland said she was so interested in the area around Jæren because of "the grandeur of the landscape and the wealth of poverty". The skill with which the landscape was executed marks her as one of Gude's most outstanding students.

== Paris ==
In 1879, Kielland moved to Paris, where she shared a studio with fellow Norwegian painter Harriet Backer from 1880-88. In Paris, she exhibited her paintings for the first time. Kielland was briefly a pupil of the landscape painter Léon Germain Pelouse who lived in nearby Cernay-la-Ville. She left Paris in 1889. A portrait of her painted by Anna Ancher shortly before her departure can be found in Anchers Hus.

== Later life and death ==
Kielland worked on simplifying her art in the 1890s under the influence of Jens Ferdinand Willumsen. She participated eagerly in public debates regarding women's rights. Kielland exhibited her work at the Palace of Fine Arts at the 1893 World's Columbian Exposition in Chicago, Illinois.

Kielland painted little towards the end of her life. She suffered from senile dementia for several years, and finally died in Kristiania in 1914.

A street in Bærum, a suburb west of Oslo, is named for her.

== Selected works ==
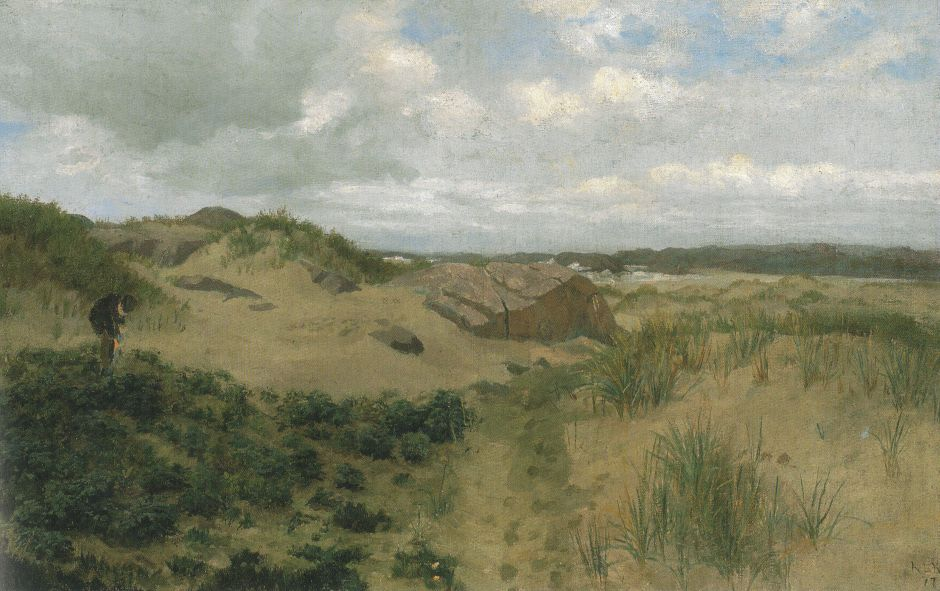
Kystlandskap, 1878

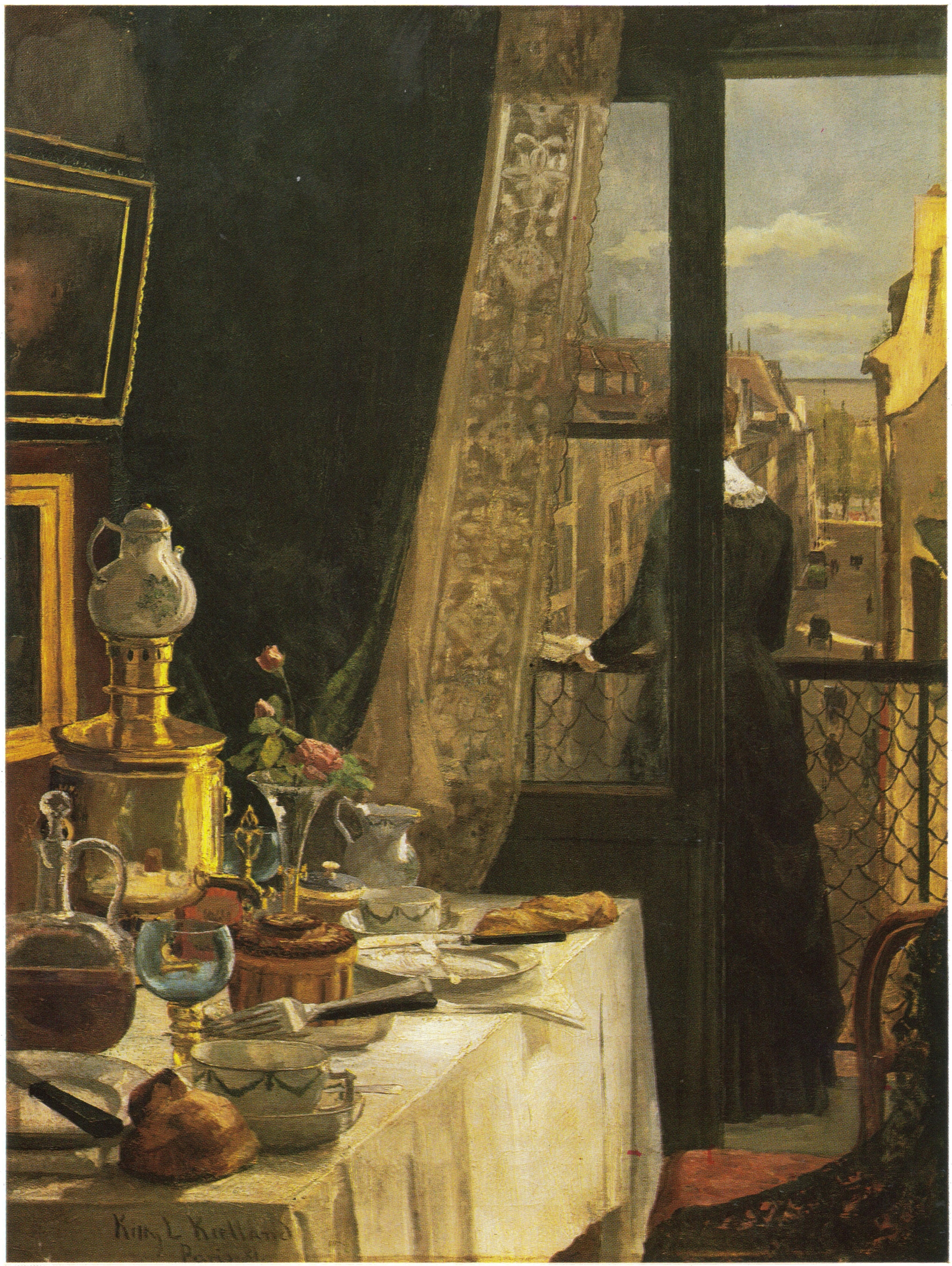
Paris apartment, 1881

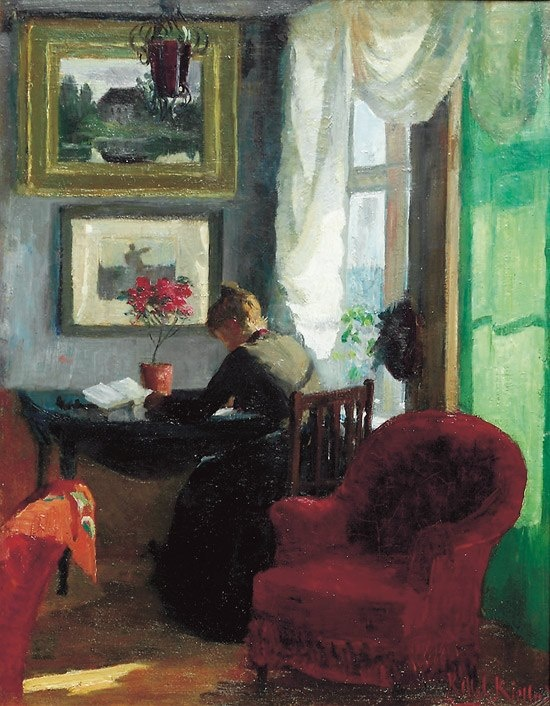
Interior, 1883

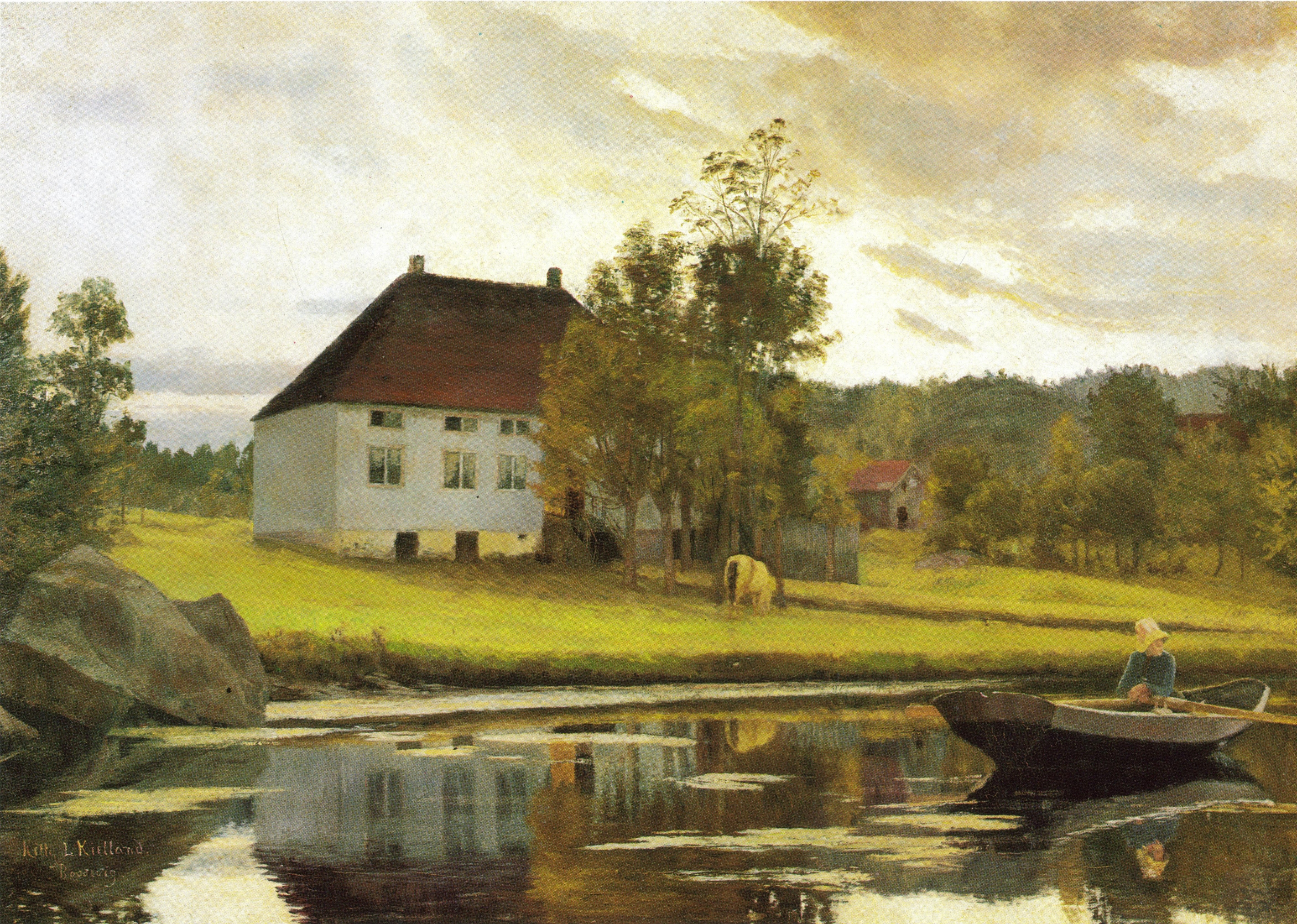
Efter solnedgang, 1885

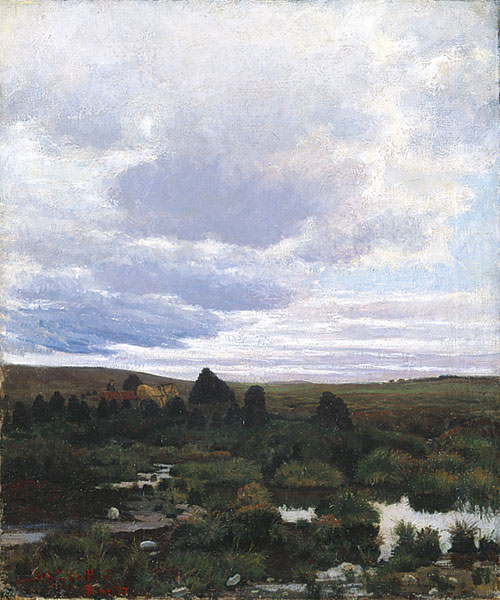
Peat Bogs on Jæren, 1882

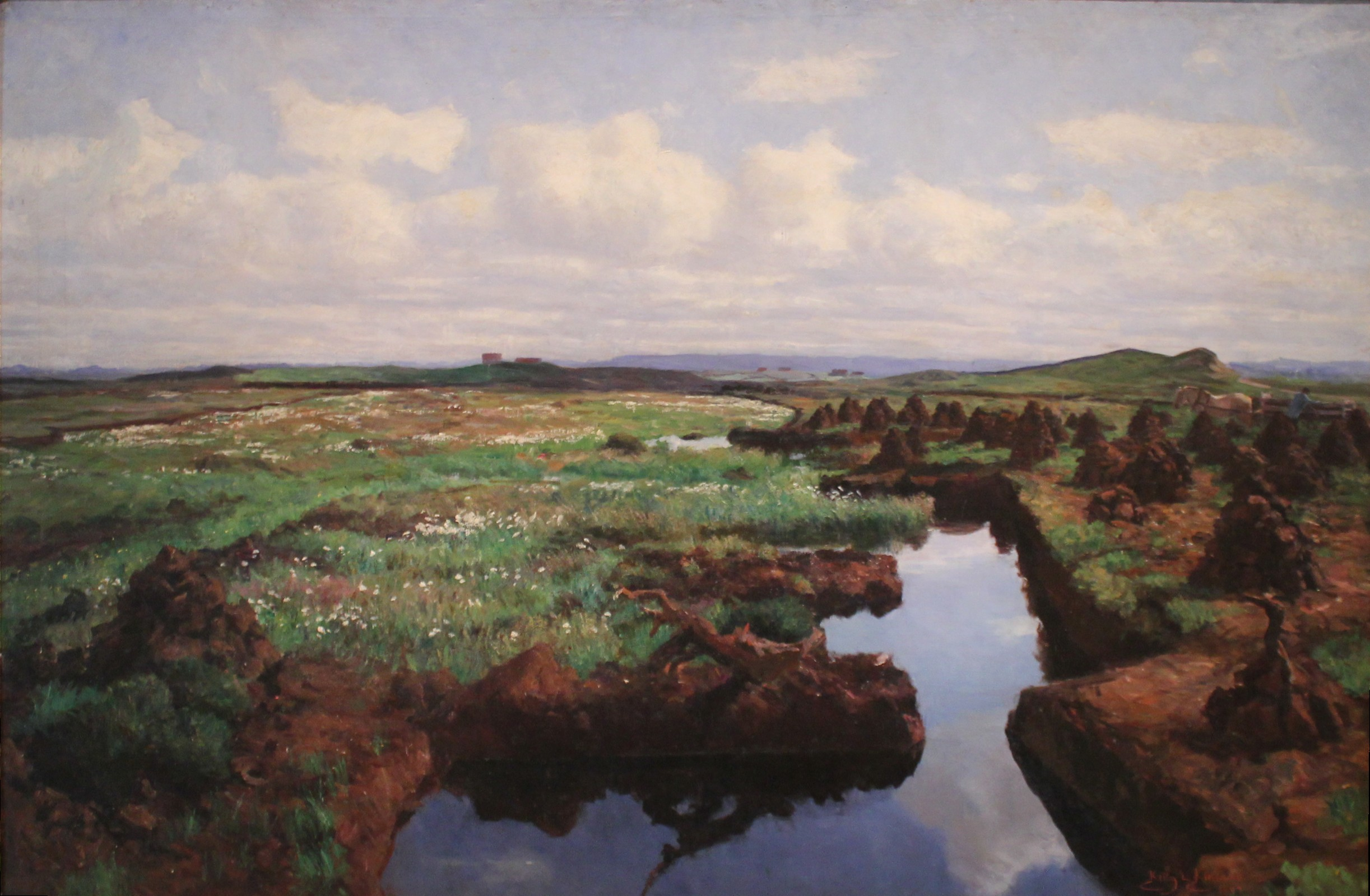
Tourbière à Jæren, 1897

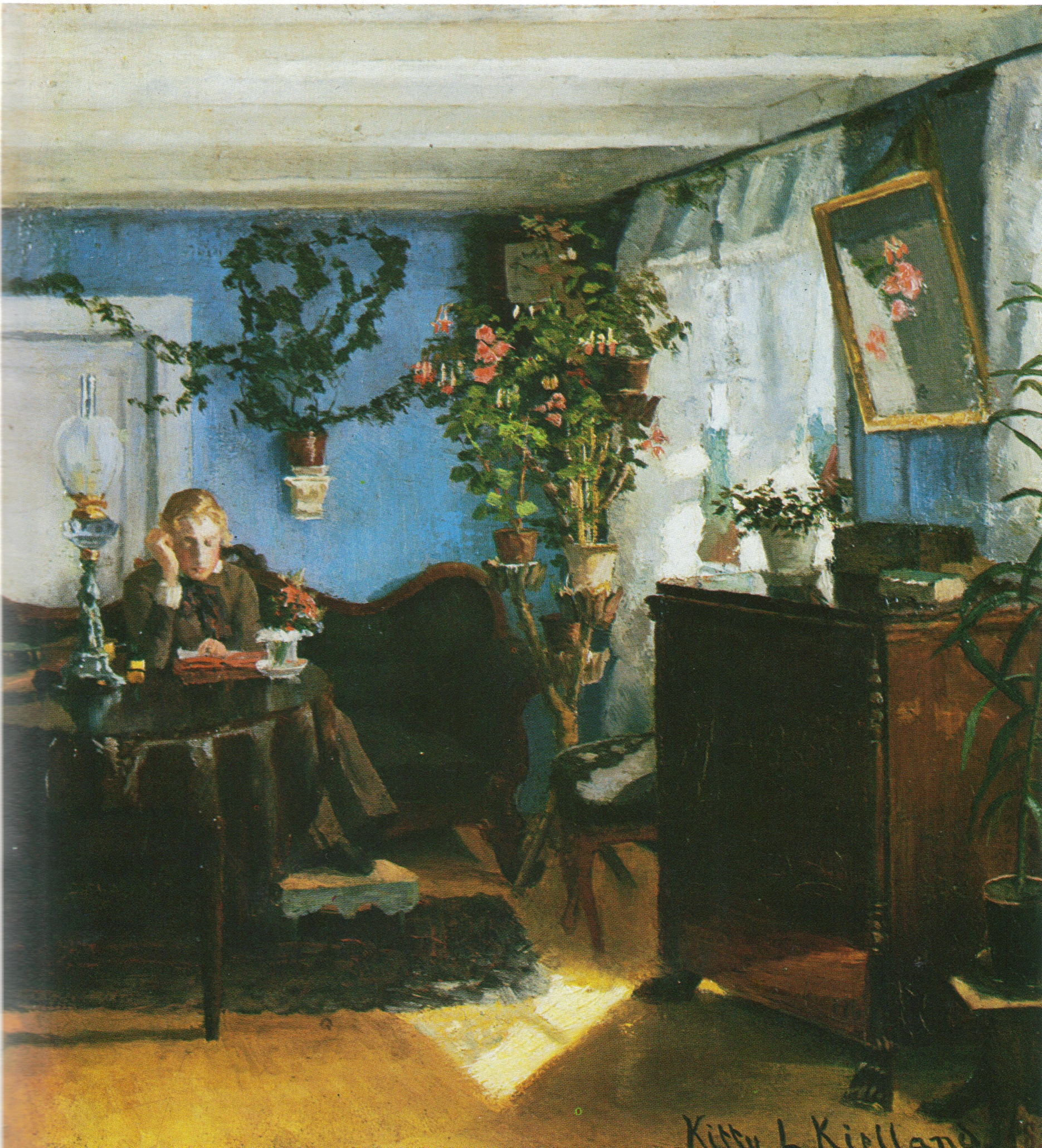
Blått interiør

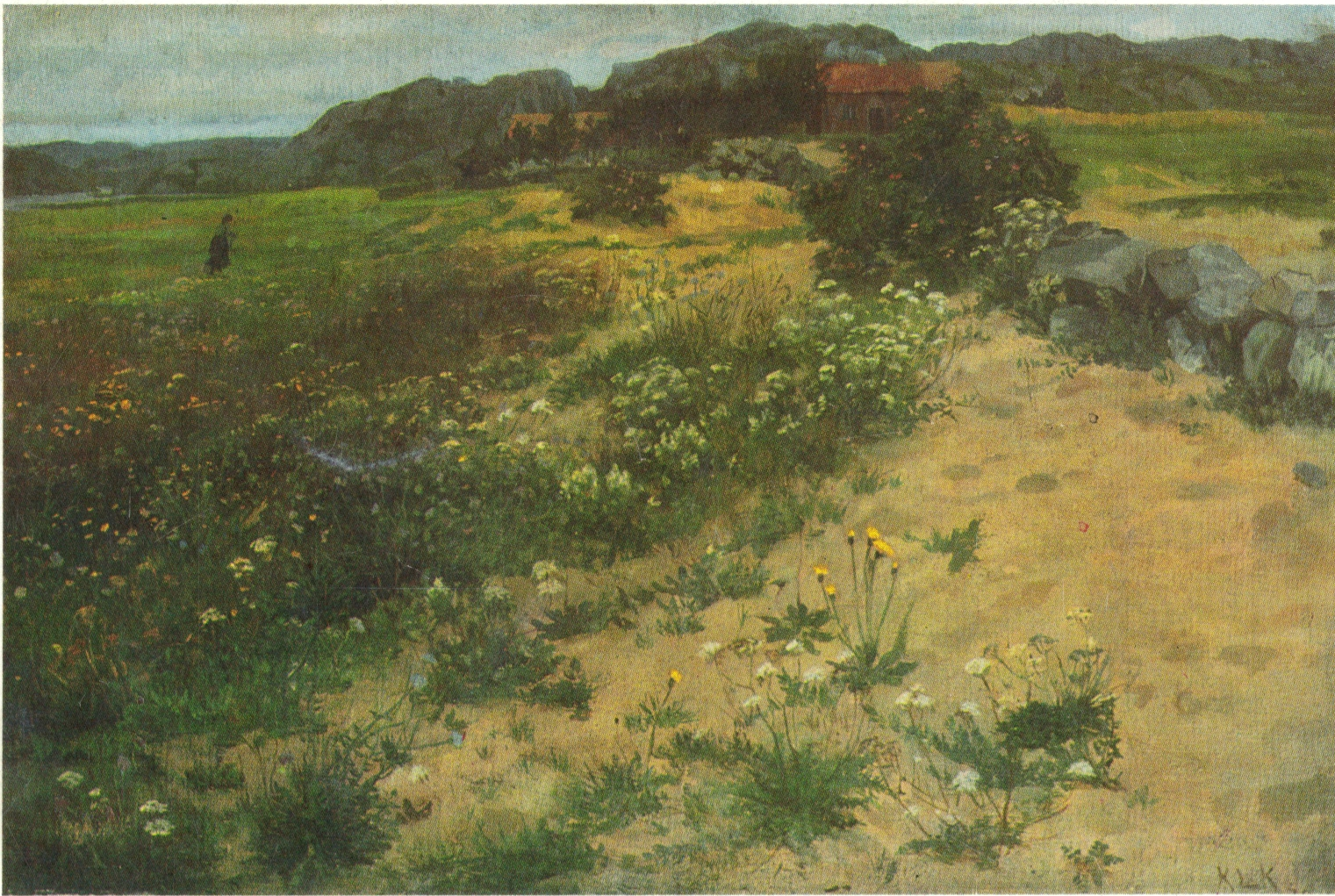
Kielland-Fra Jæren 1878
