= Grønvold =

Grønvold is a Norwegian origin surname. Notable people with the surname include:

- Audun Grønvold (1976–2025), Norwegian freestyle skier
- Didrik Hegermann Grønvold (1855–1928), Norwegian educator and writer
- Hans Aimar Mow Grønvold (1846–1926), Norwegian civil servant and music writer
- Henrik Grønvold (1858–1940), Danish naturalist, illustrator and bird artist
- Marcus Grønvold (1845–1929), Norwegian painter
- Minka Grønvold (1862–1931), Austrian-German painter and draftswoman
- Nina Tangnæs Grønvold (born 1969), Norwegian politician
- Odd Grønvold (1907–1992), Norwegian royal servant
- Roar Grønvold (born 1946), Norwegian speed skater
- Svend Aage Grønvold (1903–1969), Danish rower

== See also ==
- Gerd Grønvold Saue (1930–2022), Norwegian journalist, literary critic, novelist, and hymnwriter
