= Jeffrey Evans, 4th Baron Mountevans =

British hereditary peer and politician (born 1948)

The Right Honourable The Lord Mountevans JP
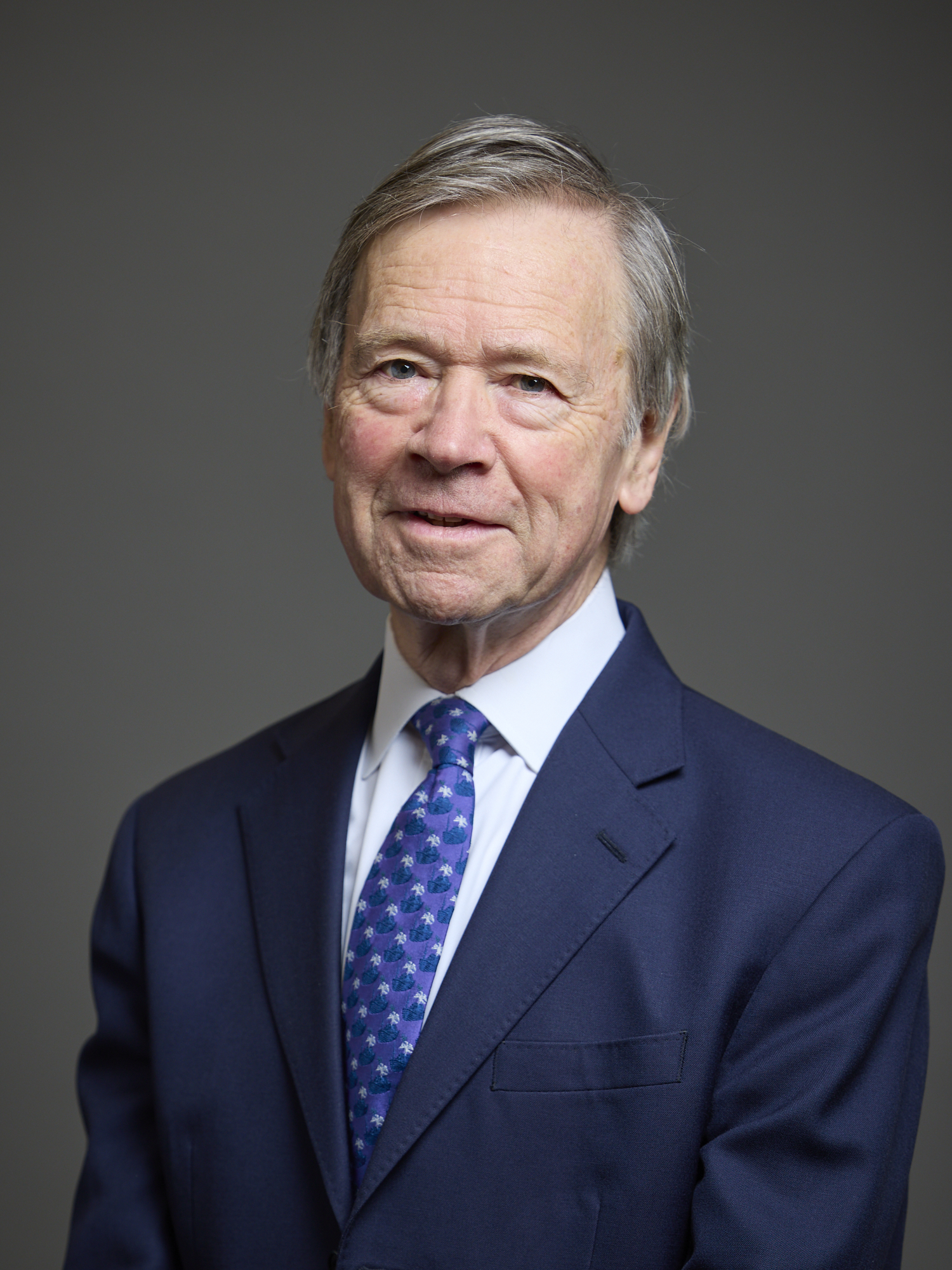
- Lord Mountevans' parliamentary portrait

688th Lord Mayor of London
- In office 13 November 2015 – 11 November 2016
- Preceded by: Sir Alan Yarrow
- Succeeded by: Sir Andrew Parmley

Sheriff of London
- In office September 2012 – September 2013 Serving with Nigel Pullman
- Preceded by: Alan Yarrow; Wendy Mead
- Succeeded by: Sir Paul Judge; Adrian Waddingham

Member of the House of Lords
- Lord Temporal
- Elected Hereditary Peer; 8 July 2015 – 29 April 2026
- By-election: 2015
- Preceded by: The 3rd Viscount Tenby

Personal details
- Born: 13 May 1948 (age 78) Gothenburg, Sweden
- Party: Crossbencher
- Education: Pembroke College, Cambridge

Jeffrey Richard de Corban Evans, 4th Baron Mountevans, JP (born 13 May 1948), is a British hereditary peer and shipbroker, who served as Lord Mayor of London from 2015 to 2016.

Lord Mountevans represented the Ward of Cheap in the City of London as Alderman from 2007 until 2018, serving as Sheriff of London for 2012/13, then Lord Mayor for 2015/16. He sat in the House of Lords as an hereditary peer, being elected in the crossbench hereditary peers' by-election of July 2015, following the retirement of Viscount Tenby.

== Biography ==
The younger son of Richard, 2nd Baron Mountevans, he succeeded to the family title in 2014, upon the death without issue of his elder brother Broke, 3rd Baron Mountevans.

Previously known as the Hon. Jeffrey Evans, he was educated at Pangbourne College in Berkshire before going up to Pembroke College, Cambridge, where he read Economics, taking the degree of MA (Cantab).

Lord Mountevans speaks fluent Norwegian, as his paternal grandmother Elsa, Lady Mountevans (died 1963) hailed from Oslo. Her father was Richard Andvord, founder of the printing company Andvord Tybring-Gjedde.

He has served as Honorary President of Canning House since 2018.

=== City and shipping career ===
Lord Mountevans was a director of gas chartering with Clarkson plc until 2017. He served as Prime Warden of the Shipwrights' Company for 2006/07 before his election as Alderman for the City Ward of Cheap in 2007, and was Sheriff of London for 2012/13. At the Michaelmas Common Hall in 2015 he was elected to serve as Lord Mayor for the ensuing year, taking office on 13 November 2015. He is also a liveryman of the Goldsmiths' and World Traders' Companies.

His many charitable involvements include being a Trustee of Seafarers UK, a leading national maritime charity, President of the City of London Sea Cadets and a Council Member of the White Ensign Association, which offers advice to all ranks of the Royal Navy and Royal Marines on employment, pensions and other financial matters.

Lord Mountevans was Chairman of the Baltic Exchange for 2023/24.

== Family ==
In 1972 he married Juliet née Wilson, daughter of the 2nd Baron Moran, and lives at Kensington, London W8.

Lord and Lady Mountevans have two sons: the Hon. Alexander Evans (born 1975), heir apparent to the peerage title, and the Hon. Julian Evans (born 1977).

== Styles ==
- Jeffrey Evans (1948–1958)
- The Hon. Jeffrey Evans (1958–2007)
- Alderman the Hon. Jeffrey Evans (2007–2014)
- Alderman the Rt Hon. the Lord Mountevans (2014–2015)
- The Rt Hon. Lord Mayor the Lord Mountevans (2015–2016)
- Alderman the Rt Hon. the Lord Mountevans (2016–2018)
- The Rt Hon. the Lord Mountevans (2018–present)

== Honours ==
- KJStJ (2015)
  - SBStJ (2013)
- Hon. FICS (2013)

== Arms ==
Coat of arms of Jeffrey Evans, 4th Baron Mountevans
Crest Between two Cross Crosslets fitchées Sable a Demi Lion erased reguardant Or holding between the paws a Boar's head also Sable. Helm That of a Baron. Escutcheon Argent two Bars wavy Azure between three Boars' heads Sable. Supporters On either side a King Penguin Proper. Motto Libertas Orders Behind the Shield, the Badge of the Order of St John: Previous versions Whilst in office, Lord Mayor Mountevans could impale the City of London arms (sinister) with the Evans family arms (dexter):

== See also ==
- Baron Mountevans
- Baltic Exchange
- Shipbroking

Peerage of the United Kingdom
Preceded by Broke Evans, 3rd Baron Mountevans	Baron Mountevans; 2014–present	Incumbent; Heir apparent: Hon. Alexander Evans
Parliament of the United Kingdom
Preceded by The Viscount Tenby	Elected hereditary peer to the House of Lords under the House of Lords Act 1999; 2015–2026	Position abolished under the House of Lords (Hereditary Peers) Act 2026
Civic offices
Preceded by Sir Alan Yarrow	Lord Mayor of London; 2015–2016	Succeeded by Sir Andrew Parmley
