= Andvord =

Andvord may refer to:

- Richard Andvord (1839–1913), Norwegian businessperson and founder of Rich. Andvord
- Rolf T. Andvord (1847–1906), Norwegian
- Kristian Andvord (1855–1934), Norwegian physician
- Richard Andvord (born 1886) (1886–1965), Norwegian military officer
- Rolf Andvord (1890–1976), Norwegian diplomat
- Richard Andvord (born 1920) (1920–1997), Norwegian businessperson

== See also ==
- Andvord Bay
- Rich. Andvord, Norwegian company
