= Richard Andvord (disambiguation) =

Richard Andvord (1839–1913) was a Norwegian businessperson.

Richard Andvord may also refer to:

- Richard Andvord (born 1886) (1886–1965), Norwegian cavalry officer and diplomat
- Richard Andvord (born 1920) (1920–1997), Norwegian businessperson and resistance member

== See also ==
- Rich. Andvord, a Norwegian company
