= Alan Yarrow =

British investment banker

Sir Alan Yarrow KStJ FCSI
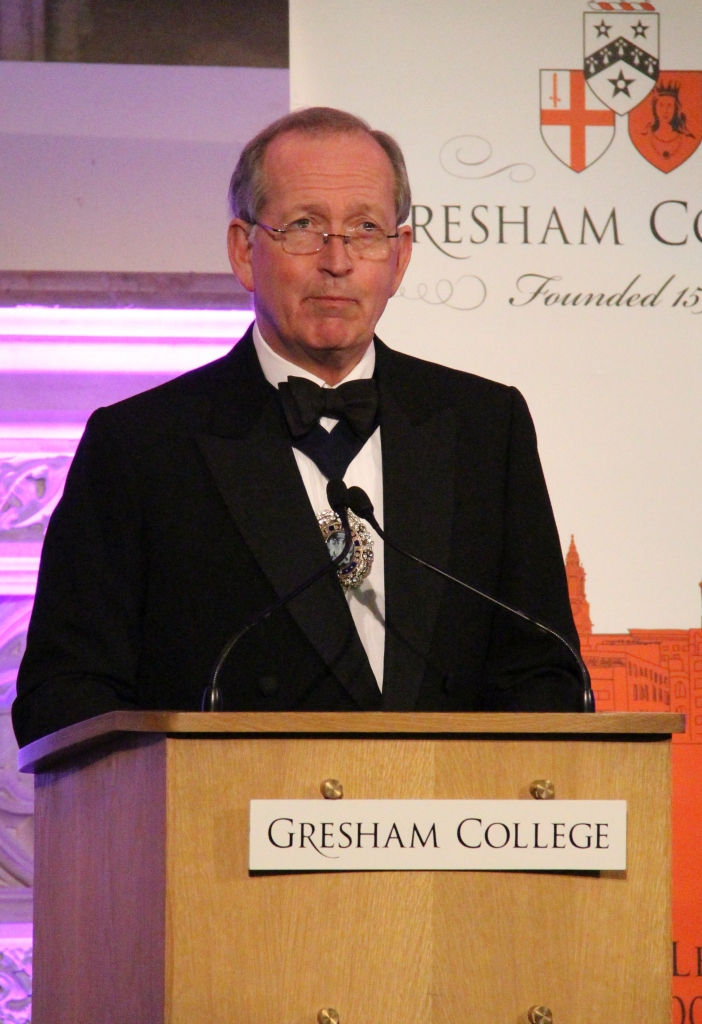
- Yarrow as ex officio President of Gresham College in 2015

687th Lord Mayor of London
- In office 7 November 2014 – 12 November 2015
- Preceded by: Dame Fiona Woolf
- Succeeded by: The Lord Mountevans

Personal details
- Born: Alan Colin Drake Yarrow; 27 June 1951 (age 74) Johor Bahru, Malaysia
- Spouse(s): Gillian Clarke, Lady Yarrow (Court Asst, Feltmakers' Co.)
- Profession: Investment banker

Sir Alan Colin Drake Yarrow, KStJ FCSI (born 27 June 1951) is a British investment banker, who has served as Chairman of the Chartered Institute for Securities & Investment (CISI) since 2009. He served as the Lord Mayor of London from 2014 to 2015.

== Biography ==
=== Early life ===
Yarrow was born at Johor Bahru, Malaysia, and attended Harrow School before studying at Manchester Business School.

=== Finance career ===
Yarrow worked as a financier in the City of London for 37 years with Dresdner Kleinwort until December 2009 and latterly as Chairman of its UK banking operations. He has also been Deputy Chairman of the Financial Services Authority practitioner panel, as well as serving on the Council of the British Bankers' Association and the Takeover Panel.

=== Civic service ===
Yarrow was appointed a Justice of the Peace (JP) for the Courts of England and Wales in London in 2007. Yarrow has represented the Ward of Bridge and Bridge Without since becoming a City Alderman in 2007. He was admitted as a Liveryman of the Worshipful Company of Fishmongers in 2007. He has since become a member of the International Bankers', Glaziers' and Launderers' livery companies. He is an Honorary Liveryman of the Worshipful Company of Scientific Instrument Makers.

Sir Alan served as Sheriff of London for 2011–2012. On 28 October 2014, he was elected to succeed Dame Fiona Woolf as the 687th Lord Mayor of London, serving for 2014–15. His responsibilities for his annual term as Lord Mayor commenced on 9 November 2014, the day before the Lord Mayor's Show. Among numerous other duties, Yarrow has promoted the City of London and UK financial services worldwide in liaison with the Foreign and Commonwealth Office.

=== Personal life ===
Yarrow married Gillian (née Clarke) in 1975. Lady Yarrow is a former teacher. The couple has two sons, Max and Guy. Lady Yarrow is Master of the Worshipful Company of Feltmakers.

== Honours ==
Yarrow was knighted in the 2016 New Year Honours for "services to international business, inclusion and the City of London".

- – Knight Bachelor (2015)
- – KJStJ (2014)
- – Placa (Officer), Order of the Aztec Eagle (2015)
  - Honorary Fellowship of Chartered Institute for Securities & Investment (FCSI) (2010).
- Honorary Doctor of Science Degree from the City, University of London on 17 December 2014.

=== Arms ===
Coat of arms of Alan Yarrow
Crest A Unicorn's Head erased Argent armed and maned Or holding in its mouth a sprig of Yarrow Flowers slipped Proper Helm That of a Knight Escutcheon Argent a representation of the Golden Hind Sable Sails Azure Pennons Gules on a Chief enarched also Gules a Trout naiant Argent between two Bezants Or Motto Latin: "Justus Esto, Et Non Metue" ("Be just, and fear not") Orders A Maltese Cross (Badge of the Order of St John) behind the Shield and the insignia of a Knight Bachelor suspended below the Shield Other elements During his term of office as Lord Mayor, Yarrow could for personal use display his family arms impaled with those of the City of London Symbolism "The Golden Hind" represents his ancestor: Sir Francis Drake Previous versions (see Yarrow baronets)

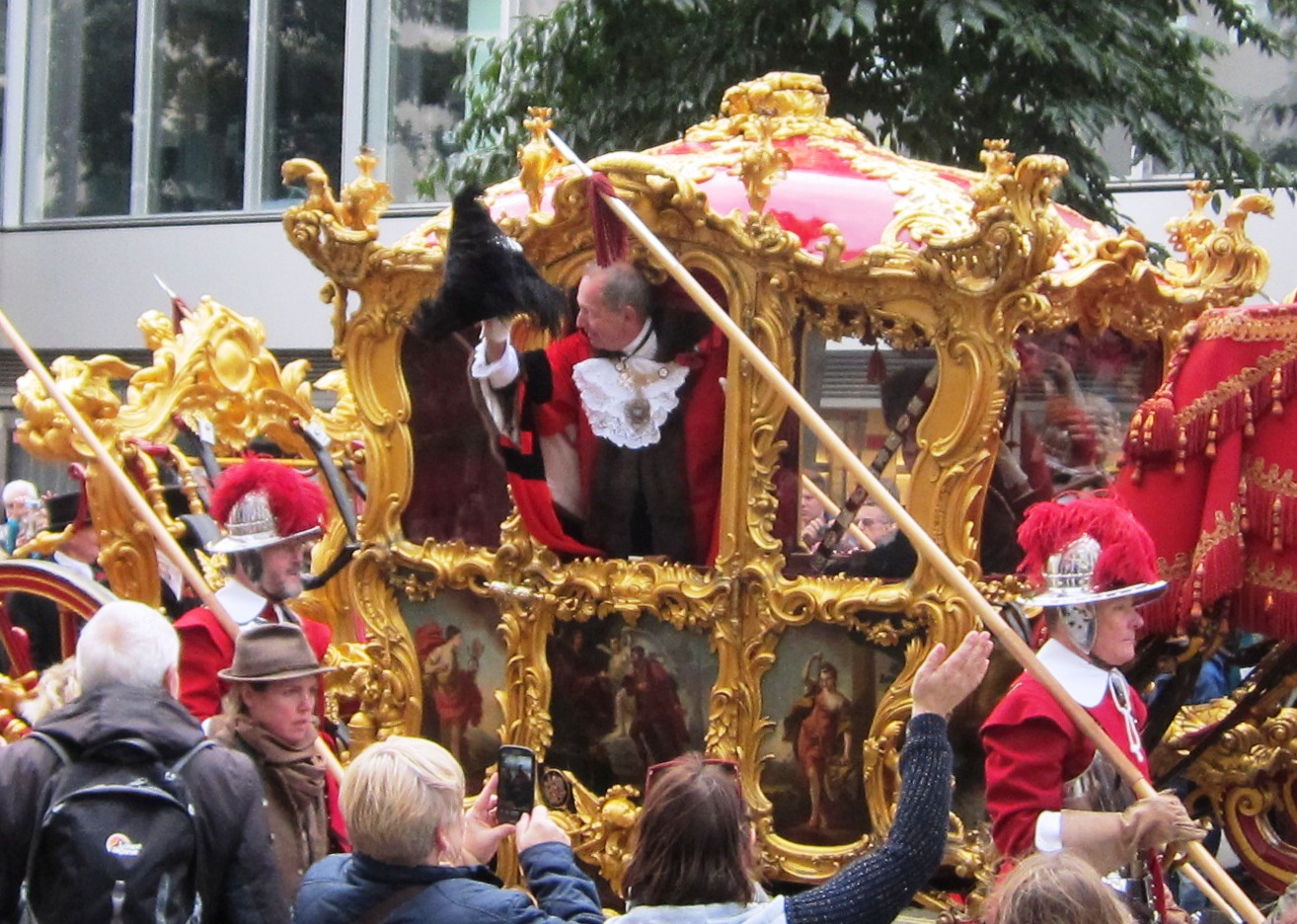
Sir Alan Yarrow's Lord Mayor's Show on Cheapside EC2 in 2014

== See also ==
- City of London
- Corporation of London

Civic offices
Preceded by Dame Fiona Woolf	Lord Mayor of London; 2014–2015	Succeeded by The Lord Mountevans
