= Steineger =

Steineger is a surname. Notable people with the surname include:

- Agnes Steineger (1863–1965), Norwegian painter
- Chris Steineger (born 1962), American politician
