= Richard Evans, 2nd Baron Mountevans =

Richard Andvord Evans, 2nd Baron Mountevans (28 August 1918 – 12 December 1974) was a British peer and business man, a member of the House of Lords from 1957 until his death.

== Life ==
The son of Admiral Edward Evans, 1st Baron Mountevans, and his wife Elsa Andvord, a daughter of Richard Andvord, he was educated at Cranbrook School, Sydney, and Stowe School.

In the Second World War, Evans gained the rank of Lieutenant in the Royal Naval Volunteer Reserve. After the war, he was with Imperial Chemical Industries between 1946 and 1961. On 20 August 1957, Evans succeeded his father as Baron Mountevans, of Chelsea, a peerage created in 1945. Joining the House of Lords he was chairman of the Anglo-Swedish Parliamentary Group and vice-chairman of the Anglo-Norwegian Parliamentary Group. He led the Norwegian Export Centre, was a Director of International Federation Periodical Press and was appointed a Knight Commander of the Order of Vasa (Sweden).

== Personal life ==
On 6 September 1940, Mountevans married Deirdre Grace O'Connell, daughter of John O'Connell, and they had three children:

- Edward Patrick Broke Evans, 3rd Baron Mountevans (1943–2014)
- Jeffrey de Corban Richard Evans, 4th Baron Mountevans (born 1948)
- Lucinda Mary Deirdre Evans (born 1951)
