= Didrik Hegermann Grønvold =

Norwegian educator and writer

Didrik Hegermann Grønvold (16 December 1855 – 24 March 1928) was a Norwegian educator and writer.

He was born in Bergen as the son of vicar Christian August Grønvold (1810–1889), and was a brother of the painters Bernt and Marcus Grønvold and a third cousin of Hans Aimar Mow Grønvold. He spent most of his career as an educator in Bergen and Hamar, and was also a writer. His best novel was Storstadsgutter (1885).
