= Richard Andvord (born 1920) =

Norwegian businessperson and resistance member (1920–1997)

Richard Andvord (18 January 1920 – 3 February 1997) was a Norwegian businessperson and resistance member.

== Career ==
Before World War II he worked in the family company Rich. Andvord in Oslo, founded by Richard Andvord in 1865. The company dealt with paper and other writing materials.

=== World War II ===
During the occupation of Norway by Nazi Germany, he participated in resistance work. In the fourth floor of the company building near Stortorvet, false ID cards and travel licences were manufactured. Because of a far-reaching network of contacts, the counterfeiters managed to keep up with the authorities' constant change of paper quality, watermarks, etc. There was also a secret weapons stash on the sixth floor. In part, the weapons were brought by Andvord from the Gudbrandsdal valley, several hours north of Oslo, where they had been secretly paradropped. He was arrested on 31 March 1942 for working with an illegal newspaper. He was incarcerated in Møllergata 19 until 24 April 1942, then in Grini concentration camp until 19 January 1943. He resumed the resistance work afterwards. Andvord also participated in various sabotage missions, blowing up fuel depots, workshops, offices and archives. He was often teamed with well-known saboteur Per Røed, in the group Aks 13000. Andvord saved Røed's life at least once, during a failed assault on the police station in Rådhusgata. In all, the group was responsible for fourteen liquidations of Nazis and collaborators.

=== Post-war career ===
In 1958 he took over the family company. Its 125-year anniversary and his personal 70-year anniversary both took place in 1990. He was a member of the board of the Norwegian Wholesale Paper Merchants Association from 1951 to 1970, and chairman from 1968 to 1971. In 1980 he received honorary membership. He was also a board member of Kreditkassen, and a member of the gentlemen's club Det Norske Selskab.

== Death and legacy ==
He died in February 1997, and was buried at Vår Frelsers gravlund in a family grave. The family company still exists, although it was merged with C. Tybring-Gjedde in 2005 to form the new company Andvord Tybring-Gjedde.
