= Richard Andvord =

Norwegian businessperson (1839–19130

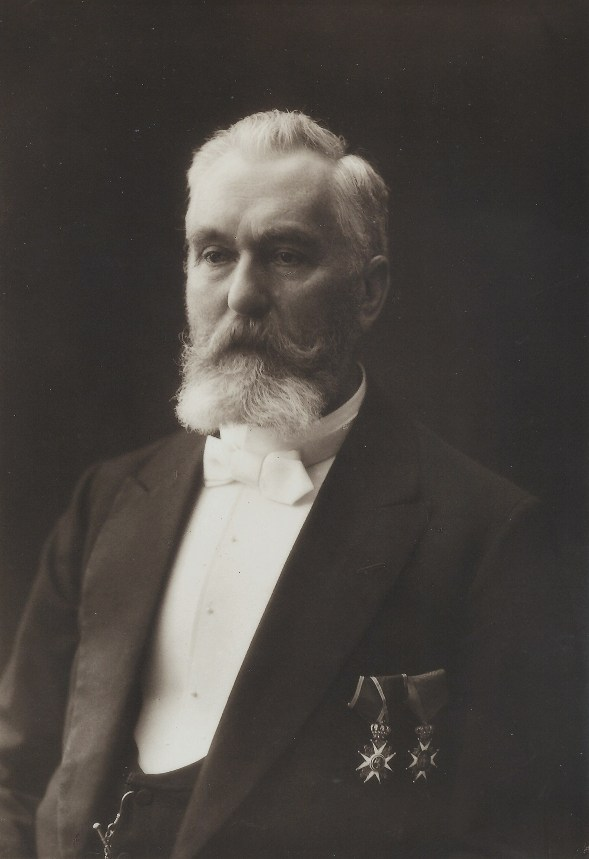
Sevald Theodor Richard Andvord

Sevald Theodor Richard Andvord (5 August 1839 – 8 November 1913) was a Norwegian businessperson, known for founding the company Rich. Andvord.

== Biography ==
He was born at Lom Municipality in Christians amt (county), Norway. He was the son of bailiff Paul Thorsteinson Andvord (1795-1863) and Thora Sevaldsdatter Kjæstad (1806–97). He moved to Christiania (now Oslo) in 1855 to work as an assistant in his uncle's shop. He also spent one year in Germany.

In 1865 he opened his own store near Stortorvet which he named Rich. Andvord. He imported pens, paper and other writing materials. Andvord soon got many notable customers, including Henrik Ibsen, Edvard Grieg, Jonas Lie, Bjørnstjerne Bjørnson, Edvard Munch, Fridtjof Nansen and Gustav Vigeland, and the store became a meeting place for artists and other notables. The new postal communication and the expanded bureaucracy meant even more for Andvord's business. He soon expanded into a larger company. Book printing and bookbinding were included in the company portfolio.

Andvord was also a member of Kristiania city council. He also served on the board of Den norske Creditbank, Kreditkassen, Storebrand, Idun and the National Theatre. Andvord was an active philanthropist, and also led Borgervæpningen, a civic guard consisting of burghers but disestablished in 1881.

Andvord was decorated with the Royal Norwegian Order of St. Olav in 1881 and also received the Swedish Order of Vasa. He died in November 1913 in Kristiania, and was buried at Vår Frelsers gravlund.

His company still exists, although it was merged with C. Tybring-Gjedde in 2005 to form the new company Andvord Tybring-Gjedde.

== Personal life ==
In 1883 he married Cathinca Sofie Jacobsen (1849–1935), a first cousin of composer Johan Svendsen. She was a skilled musician and helped led a bourgeois social life in the couple's Frogner home. They were the parents of several children and were the grandparents of Richard Andvord (1920-1997) who later took over the family business.

His daughter Elsa Andvord married Captain Edward Evans, later first Baron Mountevans, and Andvord was the grandfather of Richard Andvord Evans, 2nd Baron Mountevans (born 1918).
