= Agnes Steineger =

Norwegian painter (1863–1965)

- self-portrait 1895
- Born: 21 January 1863; Bergen, Norway
- Died: 16 June 1965 (aged 102)
- Known for: Painting
- Relatives: Leonhard Stejneger (brother)

Agnes Steineger (21 January 1863 – 16 June 1965) was a Norwegian painter.

== Personal life ==
Steineger was born in Bergen, Norway. Her father was Peter Stamer Steineger, a merchant and auditor; her mother was Ingeborg Catharine (Hess). She was one of seven children, who included her eldest brother Leonhard Stejneger.

== Career ==
Steineger showed early talent for both music and drawing. In Bergen, she was a student at the public drawing school and, in 1880, painted with Anders Askevold. She traveled in 1881 to Munich, where she studied under Marcus Grønvold and with Bertha Wegmann. When Wegmann traveled to Copenhagen in 1883, Steineger followed, and that same year she painted her first significant work, Markblomster, which was exhibited at the Bergen Art Association. Steineger was Wegmann's student until 1886, when she traveled to Paris. Here she studied under several teachers, among others Gustave Courtois at Académie Colarossi. Steineger exhibited her work at the Palace of Fine Arts at the 1893 World's Columbian Exposition in Chicago, Illinois. Between 1902 and 1914, Steineger was a resident in Italy, partly in Sicily and partly in Florence. From 1914 to 1918, she lived at the Goetheanum cultural centre for the arts in Dornach, Switzerland, operated by Rudolf Steiner.

Among her works are Markblomster from 1883 and Pleiebarn from 1890. A self-portrait from 1895 is located at Bergen Kunstmuseum, and the painting Interiør med lampe from 1915 is found at the National Gallery of Norway.

== Selected works ==
- Markblomster, 1883
- Frida Rusti, 1889
- Pleiebarn, 1890
- Cecilie Dahl, 1897
- Interiør med lampe, 1915
