= Comparison of the Amundsen and Scott expeditions =

Analysis of expeditions to the South Pole

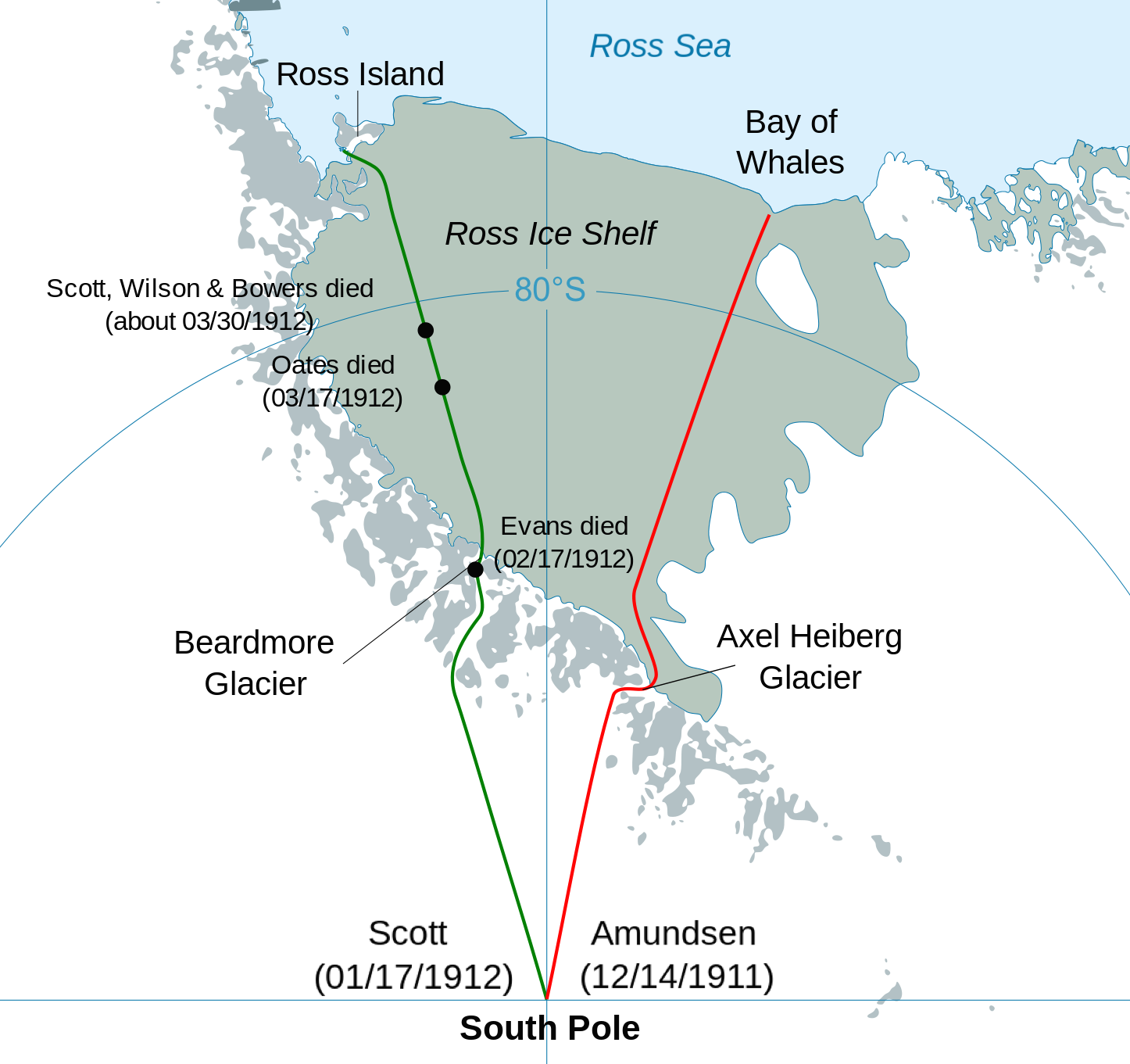
The routes to the South Pole taken by Scott (green) and Amundsen (red), 1911–1912.

Between December 1911 and January 1912, both Roald Amundsen (leading his South Pole expedition) and Robert Falcon Scott (leading the Terra Nova Expedition) reached the South Pole within five weeks of each other. But while Scott and his four companions died on the return journey, Amundsen's party managed to reach the geographic south pole first and subsequently return to their base camp at Framheim without loss of human life, suggesting that they were better prepared for the expedition. The contrasting fates of the two teams seeking the same prize at the same time invites comparison.

== Objectives of the expeditions ==
Scott and his financial backers saw the expedition as having a scientific basis, while also wishing to reach the pole. However, it was recognised by all involved that the South Pole was the primary objective ("The Southern Journey involves the most important object of the Expedition" – Scott), and had priority in terms of resources, such as the best ponies and all the dogs and motor sledges, as well as involvement of the vast majority of the expedition personnel. Scott and his team knew the expedition would be judged on his attainment of the pole ("The ... public will gauge the result of the scientific work of the expedition largely in accordance with the success or failure of the main object" – Scott). He was prepared to make a second attempt the following year (1912–13) if this attempt failed and had Indian Army mules and additional dogs delivered in anticipation. In fact the mules were used by the team that discovered the dead bodies of Scott, Henry Robertson Bowers and Edward Adrian Wilson in November 1912, but proved even less useful than the ponies, according to Cherry-Garrard.

Amundsen's expedition was planned to reach the South Pole. This was a plan he conceived in 1909. Amundsen's expedition did conduct geographical work under Kristian Prestrud, who conducted an expedition to King Edward VII Land, while Amundsen was undertaking his attempt at the pole.

== Outcomes ==
The outcomes of the two expeditions were as follows.

=== Exploration ===
- Priority at the South Pole: Amundsen beat Scott to the South Pole by 34 days.

=== Fatalities ===
Scott lost five men including himself returning from the pole, out of a team of 65. Amundsen's entire team of 19 returned to Norway safely. Some authors (including Huntford and Fiennes) associate up to two further deaths (the drowning of Robert Brissenden and the suicide of Hjalmar Johansen) with the two expeditions, but these happened outside the Antarctic Circle.

=== Causes ===
Historically, several factors have been discussed and many contributing factors claimed, including:

- Priority at the pole: Scott wrote that Amundsen's dogs seriously threatened his own polar aspirations, because dogs, being more cold-tolerant than ponies, would be able to start earlier in the season than Scott's mixed transport of dogs, ponies and motors.
- Cherry-Garrard in The Worst Journey in the World agreed but added that, in his experience, dogs would not have been able to ascend the Beardmore Glacier.
- With regards to the causes of the deaths of Scott and his companions, Cherry-Garrard devotes chapter 19 in his book to examine the causes. Among several other factors, he surmised that the rations of Scott's team were inadequate and did not provide enough energy for the men.
- Much of Scott's hauling was to be done by ponies, which are ill-suited to work on snow and ice without snow-shoes. Their relatively small hooves and large weight caused them to sink into anything other than very firm snow or ice. Oates was opposed to snow-shoes and had left most of them at base camp.
- Ponies' coats easily became soaked with perspiration during exertion, thus necessitating constant attention with blankets to avoid hypothermia through evaporation. Dogs in contrast do not have sweat glands—they cool themselves via panting, making them less vulnerable to the cold. With ponies, Scott acknowledged he could not depart until 1 November 1911 when the weather would be warmer, leaving him less time to complete the journey.
- The loss of ponies, several of which had drowned on disintegrating sea-ice, limited the supplies that could be hauled to the depots. Of 19 ponies brought south to aid in laying depots on the Ross Ice Shelf (traversed during the first and final quarters of the trek), nine were lost before the journey began. Further, unlike dogs, which could eat the abundant seal and penguin meat found in Antarctica, the ponies' food had to be carried forward from the ship, vastly increasing the stores that had to be transported as Scott's expedition moved towards the pole.
- Had the One-Ton depot been placed at latitude 80° S., as planned, Scott and his two surviving companions could have reached it on their return march. Instead, because Scott refused to drive the ponies to their deaths, despite Oates' urgent advice to do so, the depot was placed some 50 kilometres (31 mi) short of there. Scott's party died 18 km (11 mi) south of the depot.
- The last-minute addition of Lieutenant Henry R. Bowers to the planned four-man pole party may have strained the rationing plan, although the death of Petty Officer Evans weeks later reduced the party to four again.
- The rations were deficient in vitamins B and C. The party became weaker a few weeks after reaching the pole, despite Scott's racing ambitions before the return march, writing "Now for a desperate struggle to get the news through first [before Amundsen reaches the cablehead in Australia]. I wonder if we can do it." Atkinson around 1918 would begin to gather up materials on his war-time findings, as well as his Terra Nova Expedition reports. He would later reveal to Cherry-Garrard the results of research he had conducted on the nutritional value of Scott's party's Barrier and Plateau rations. He found that the Barrier rations were generating only 51% of the calories required to support a typical Barrier workload, the corresponding Plateau figure being 57%. These figures provided a substantial explanation (starvation) for the physical failure of the polar party.
- The tins of cooking fuel cached along the return route were found to be partly empty, which forced the men to eat frozen food. Shortage of fuel to melt water likely caused the men to become dehydrated. Apparently the heat of the sun had vaporised part of the fuel, enabling it to escape past the cork stoppers. By contrast, Amundsen knew about this fuel "creep" and had had his fuel tins soldered shut on the voyage to Antarctica; see below.
- The weather on the return march seems to have been unusually bad. In particular, when the party reached the Great Ice Barrier, the temperature was much lower than expected for the season, making the surface much less suitable for the sledge runners. Furthermore, the tailwind which they had expected to aid them home did not appear. Scott wrote, in his final "Message to the Public": "...our wreck is certainly due to this sudden advent of severe weather...."
- The complexity of the transportation plan made it vulnerable. It depended in part on motor-sledges, ponies, dogs and southerly winds to assist the sledges (which were fitted with sails). Half of the distance was intended to be covered by man-hauling (and sails whenever conditions permitted). Scott's daily marches were limited to the endurance of the slowest team, the man-haulers who were instructed to advance 15 miles a day. The ponies marched by night and rested when the sun was warmer, Meares remained idle in camp with the much faster dogs for many hours, before catching up at the end of the day.

Sullivan states that it was the last factor that probably was decisive. He states:

Man is a poor beast of burden, as was shown in the terrible experience of Scott, Shackleton, and Wilson in their thrust to the south of 1902–3. However, Scott relied chiefly on man-hauling in 1911–12 because ponies could not ascend the glacier midway to the Pole. The Norwegians correctly guessed that dog teams could go all the way. Furthermore, they used a simple plan, based on their native skill with skis and on dog-driving methods that were tried and true. The moon will be reached by burning up a succession of rocket stages and casting them off. This, in effect, is what the Norwegians did with their dogs, the weaker animals being sacrificed to feed the other animals and the men themselves.

—

== Base camps ==
Amundsen camped on the Ross Ice Shelf at the Bay of Whales at approx. 78°30′S, which is 52 nautical miles (96 km) closer to the pole than Scott's camp (at 77°38′S) which was 350 nmi (650 km) west of Amundsen, on Ross Island. Amundsen had deduced that, as the Trans-Antarctic Mountains ran northwest to southeast then if he were to meet a mountain range on his route then the time spent at the high altitude of the Antarctic plateau would be less than Scott's. Scott's base was at Cape Evans on Ross Island, with access to the Trans-Antarctic mountain range to the west, and was a better base for geological exploration. He had based his previous expedition in the same area. However, he knew it to be poor as a route to the pole as he had to start before sea ice melted and had suffered delay in returning while waiting for the sea ice to freeze. They also had to make detours around Ross Island and its known crevassed areas, which meant a longer journey. The crossing of the Ross Ice Shelf was an onerous task for the ponies. Scott had advanced considerable stores across the ice shelf the year before to allow the ponies to carry lighter loads over the early passage across the ice. Even so, he had to delay the departure of the ponies until 1 November rather than 24 October, when the dogs and motor sledges set off. Consequently, the Motor Party spent 6 days at the Mount Hooper Depot waiting for Scott to arrive.

== Methods of transport ==
=== Motor sledges ===
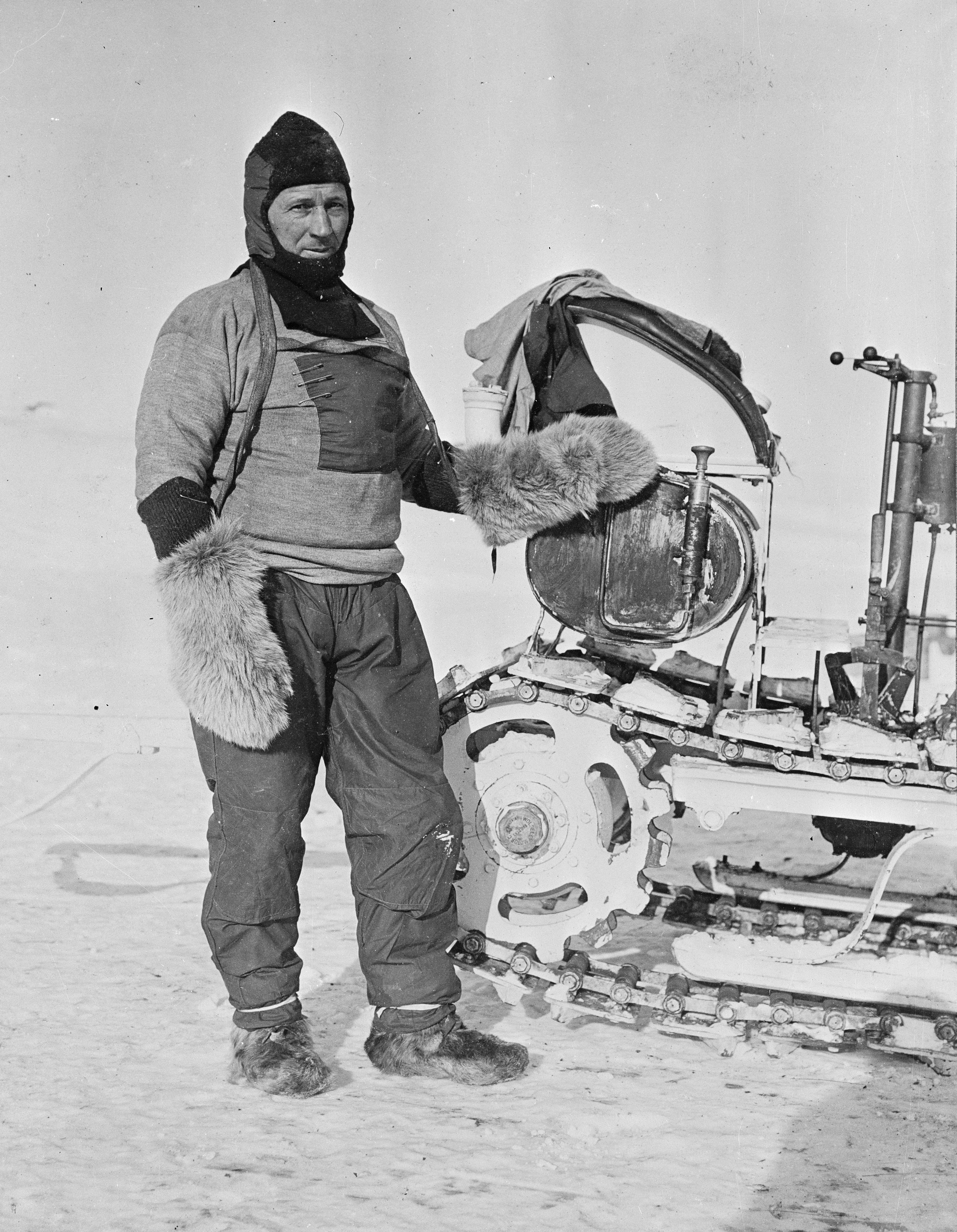
William Lashly by a motor sledge in November 1911.

The major comparison between Scott and Amundsen has focused on the choice of draft transport—dog versus pony/man-hauling. In fact Scott took dogs, ponies and three "motor sledges". Scott spent nearly seven times the amount of money on his motor sledges than on the dogs and horses combined. They were therefore a vital part of the expedition. Unfortunately, Scott decided to leave behind the engineer, Lieutenant Commander Reginald William Skelton, who had created and trialled the motor sledges. This was due to the selection of Lieutenant E.R.G.R. "Teddy" Evans as the expedition's second in command. As Evans was junior in rank to Skelton, he insisted that Skelton could not come on the expedition. Scott agreed to this request, causing Skelton's experience and knowledge to be lost. One of the original three motor sledges was a failure even before the expedition set out: the heavy sledge was lost through thin ice on unloading it from the ship. The two remaining motor sledges failed relatively early in the main expedition because of repeated faults. Skelton's experience might have been valuable in overcoming the failures.

=== Ponies vs dogs ===
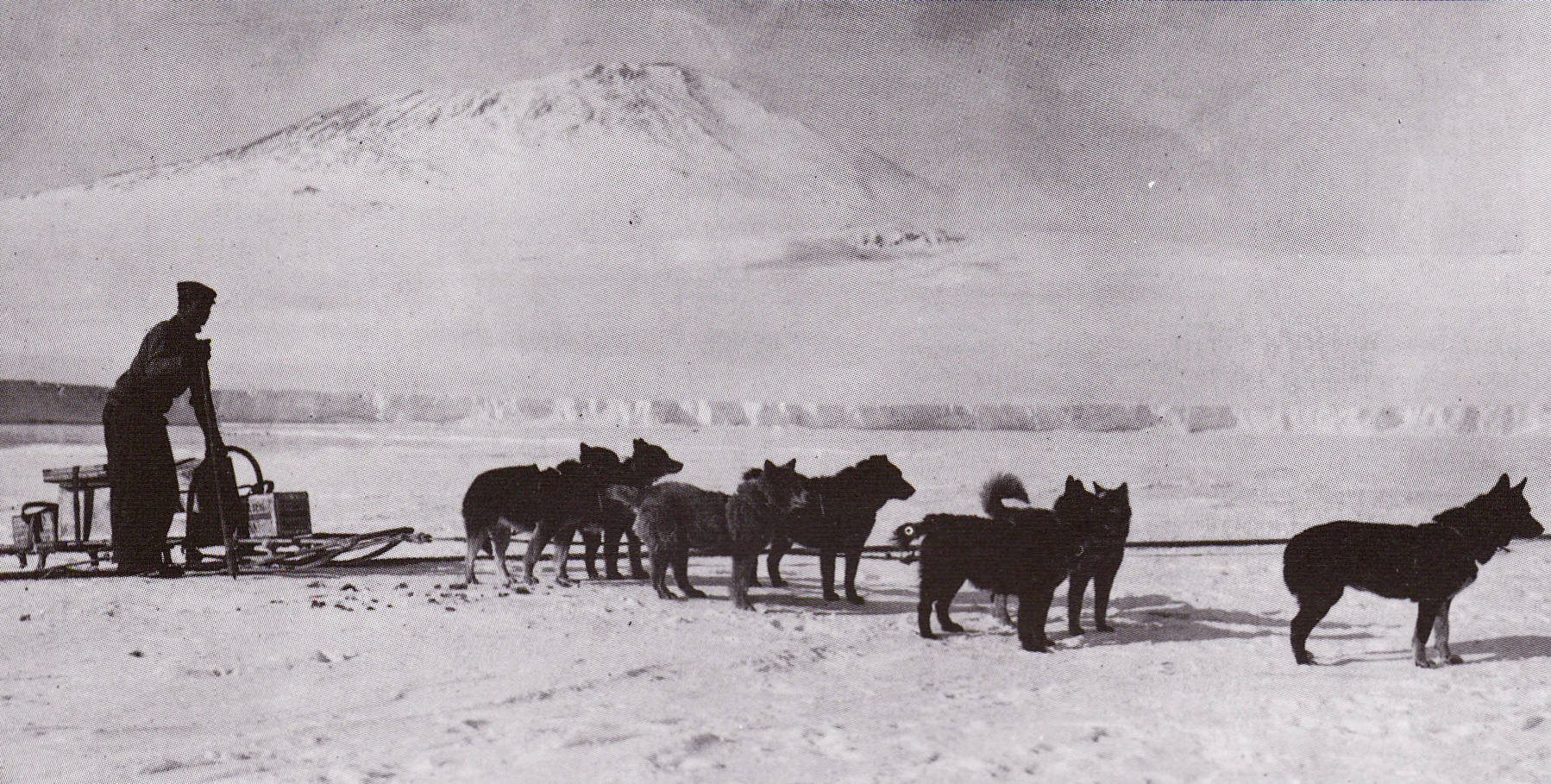
Terra Nova's sled dogs.

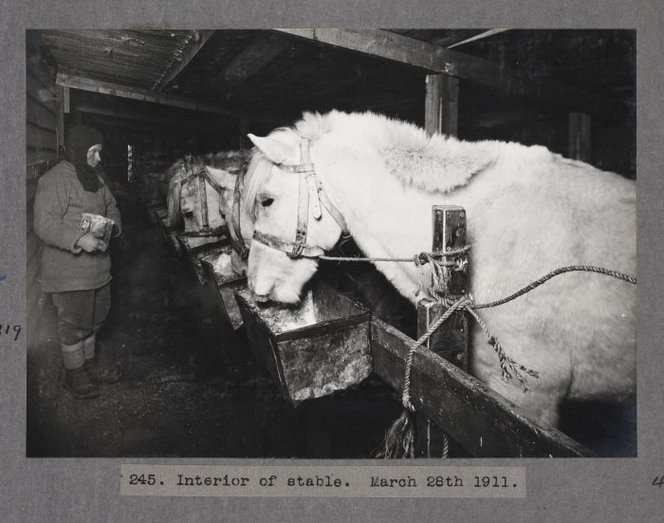
The ponies in the stable, 28 March 1911.

Scott had used dogs on his first (Discovery) expedition and felt they had failed. On that journey, Scott, Shackleton, and Wilson started with three sledges and 13 dogs. But on that expedition, the men had not properly understood how to travel on snow with the use of dogs. The party had skis but were too inexperienced to make good use of them. As a result, the dogs travelled so fast that the men could not keep up with them. The Discovery expedition had to increase their loads to slow the dogs down. Additionally, the dogs were fed Norwegian dried fish, which did not agree with them and soon they began to deteriorate. The whole team of dogs eventually died (and were eaten) and the men took over hauling the sleds.

Scott's opinion was reinforced by Shackleton's experience on the Nimrod expedition, which got to within 97.5 nautical miles (180.6 km; 112.2 mi) of the pole. Shackleton used ponies. Scott planned to use ponies only to the base of the Beardmore Glacier (one-quarter of the total journey) and man-haul the rest of the journey. Scott's team had developed snow shoes for his ponies and trials showed they could significantly increase daily progress. However, Lawrence Oates, whom Scott had made responsible for the ponies, was reluctant to use the snow shoes and Scott failed to insist on their use.

There was plenty of evidence that dogs could succeed in the achievements of William Speirs Bruce in his Arctic, Antarctic and Scottish National Antarctic Expedition, Amundsen in the Gjøa North West passage expedition, Fridtjof Nansen's attempt at the North Pole, Robert Peary's three attempts at the North Pole, Eivind Astrup's work supporting Peary, Frederick Cook's discredited North Pole expedition and Otto Sverdrup's explorations of Ellesmere Island. Moreover, Scott ignored the direct advice he received (while attending trials of the motor sledges in Norway) from Nansen, the most famous explorer of the day, who told Scott to take "dogs, dogs and more dogs".

At the time of the events, the expert view in England had been that dogs were of dubious value as a means of Antarctic transport. Broadly speaking, Scott saw two ways in which dogs may be used—they may be taken with the idea of bringing them all back safe and sound, or they may be treated as pawns in the game, from which the best value is to be got regardless of their lives. He stated that if, and only if, the comparison was made with a dog sledge journey which aimed to preserve the dogs' lives, 'I am inclined to state my belief that in the polar regions properly organised parties of men will perform as extended journeys as teams of dogs.' On the other hand, if the lives of the dogs were to be sacrificed, then 'the dog-team is invested with a capacity for work which is beyond the emulation of men. To appreciate this is a matter of simple arithmetic'. But efficiency notwithstanding, he expressed "reluctance" to use dogs in this way: "One cannot calmly contemplate the murder of animals which possess such intelligence and individuality, which have frequently such endearing qualities, and which very possibly one has learnt to regard as friends and companions."

Amundsen, by contrast, took an entirely utilitarian approach. Amundsen planned from the start to have weaker animals killed to feed the other animals and the men themselves. He expressed the opinion that it was less cruel to feed and work dogs correctly before shooting them, than it would be to starve and overwork them to the point of collapse. Amundsen and his team had similar affection for their dogs as those expressed above by the English, but they "also had agreed to shrink from nothing in order to achieve our goal". The British thought such a procedure was distasteful, though they were willing to eat their ponies.

Amundsen had used the opportunity of learning from the Inuit while on his Gjøa North West passage expedition of 1905. He recruited experienced dog drivers. To make the most of the dogs he paced them and deliberately kept daily mileages shorter than he need have for 75 percent of the journey and his team spent up to 16 hours a day resting. His dogs could eat seals and penguins hunted in the Antarctic, while Scott's pony fodder had to be brought all the way from England in their ship. It has been later shown that seal meat with the blubber attached is the ideal food for a sledge dog. Amundsen went with 52 dogs and came back with 11.

What Scott did not realise is that a sledge dog, if it is to do the same work as a man, will require the same amount of food. Furthermore, when sledge dogs are given insufficient food they become difficult to handle. The advantage of the sledge dog is its greater mobility. Not only were the Norwegians accustomed to skiing, which enabled them to keep up with their dogs, but they also understood how to feed them and not overwork them.

=== Walking vs skiing on snow ===
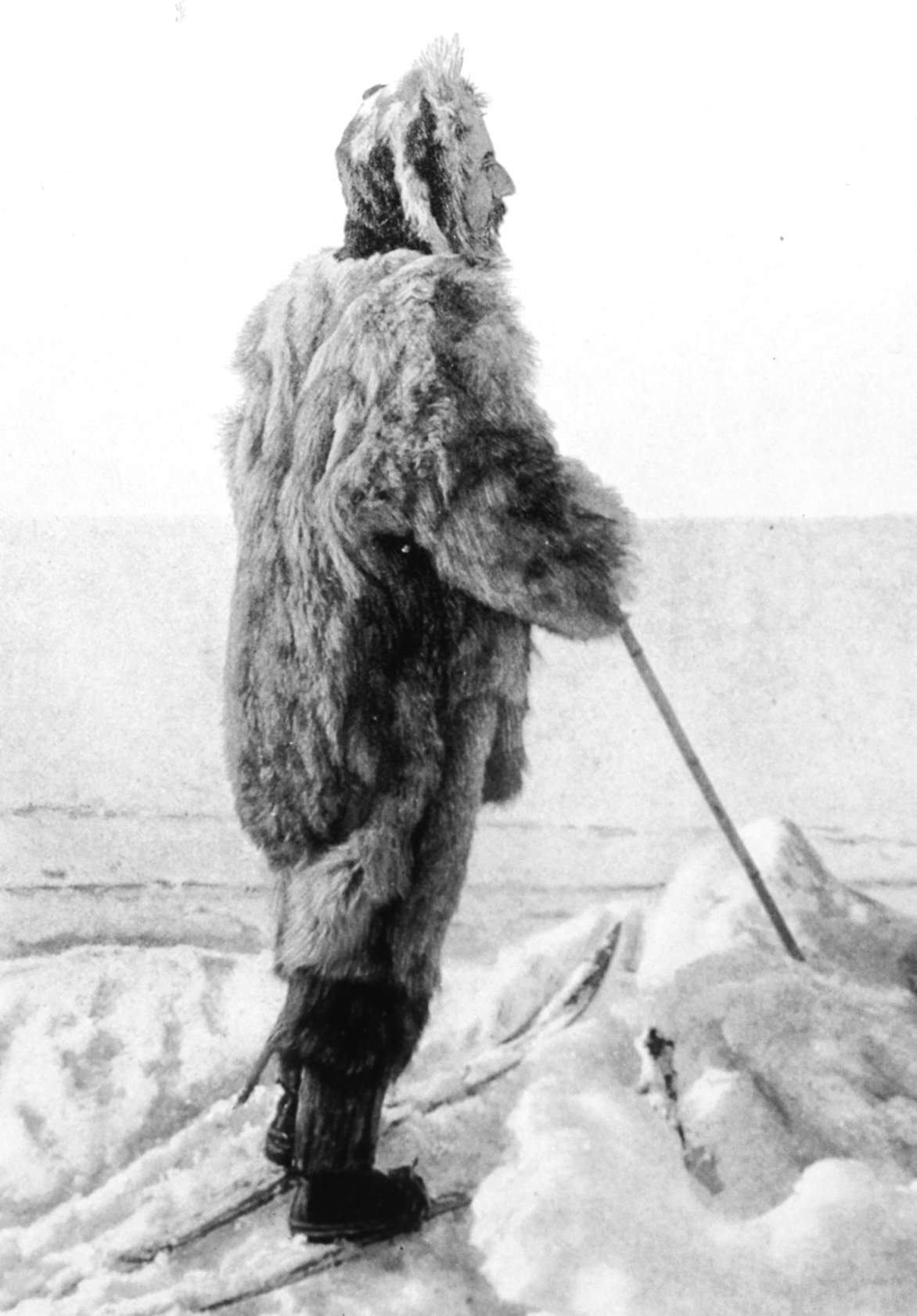
Amundsen on skis, 7 March 1909.

Scott took the Norwegian pilot and skier Tryggve Gran to the Antarctic on the recommendation of Nansen to train his expedition to ski, but although a few of his party began to learn, he made no arrangements for compulsory training for the full party. Gran (possibly because he was Norwegian) was not included in the South Pole party, which could have made a difference. Gran was, one year later, the first to locate the deceased Scott and his remaining companions in their tent just some 18 km (11 miles) short of One Ton depot, that might have saved their lives had they reached it.

Scott would subsequently complain in his diary, while well into his journey and therefore too late to take any corrective action and after over 10 years since the Discovery expedition, that "Skis are the thing, and here are my tiresome fellow countrymen too prejudiced to have prepared themselves for the event".

Amundsen, on his side, recruited a team of well experienced skiers, all Norwegians who had skied from an early age. He also recruited a champion skier, Olav Bjaaland, as the front runner. The Amundsen party gained weight on their return travel from the South Pole.

== Weather conditions ==
Scott and Shackleton's experience in 1903 and 1907 gave them first-hand experience of average conditions in Antarctica. Simpson, Scott's meteorologist 1910–1912, charted the weather during their expedition, often taking two readings a day. On their return to the Ross Ice Shelf, Scott's group experienced prolonged low temperatures from 27 February until 10 March which have only been matched once in 15 years of records as of 2001. The exceptional severity of the weather meant they failed to make the daily distances they needed to get to the next depot. This was a serious position as they were short of fuel and food. When Scott, Wilson, and Bowers died (Petty Officer Edgar Evans and Lawrence Oates had died earlier during the return from the South Pole) they were 18 kilometres (11 mi) short of One-Ton Depot, which was 230 kilometres (140 mi) from Corner Camp, where they would have been safe.

On the other hand, Cherry-Garrard had travelled nearly 500 kilometres (300 mi) in the same area, during the same time period and same temperatures, using a dog team. Scott also blamed "a prolonged blizzard". But while there is evidence to support the low temperatures, there is only evidence for a "normal" two- to four-day blizzard, and not the ten days that Scott claims.

== Route marking and depot laying ==
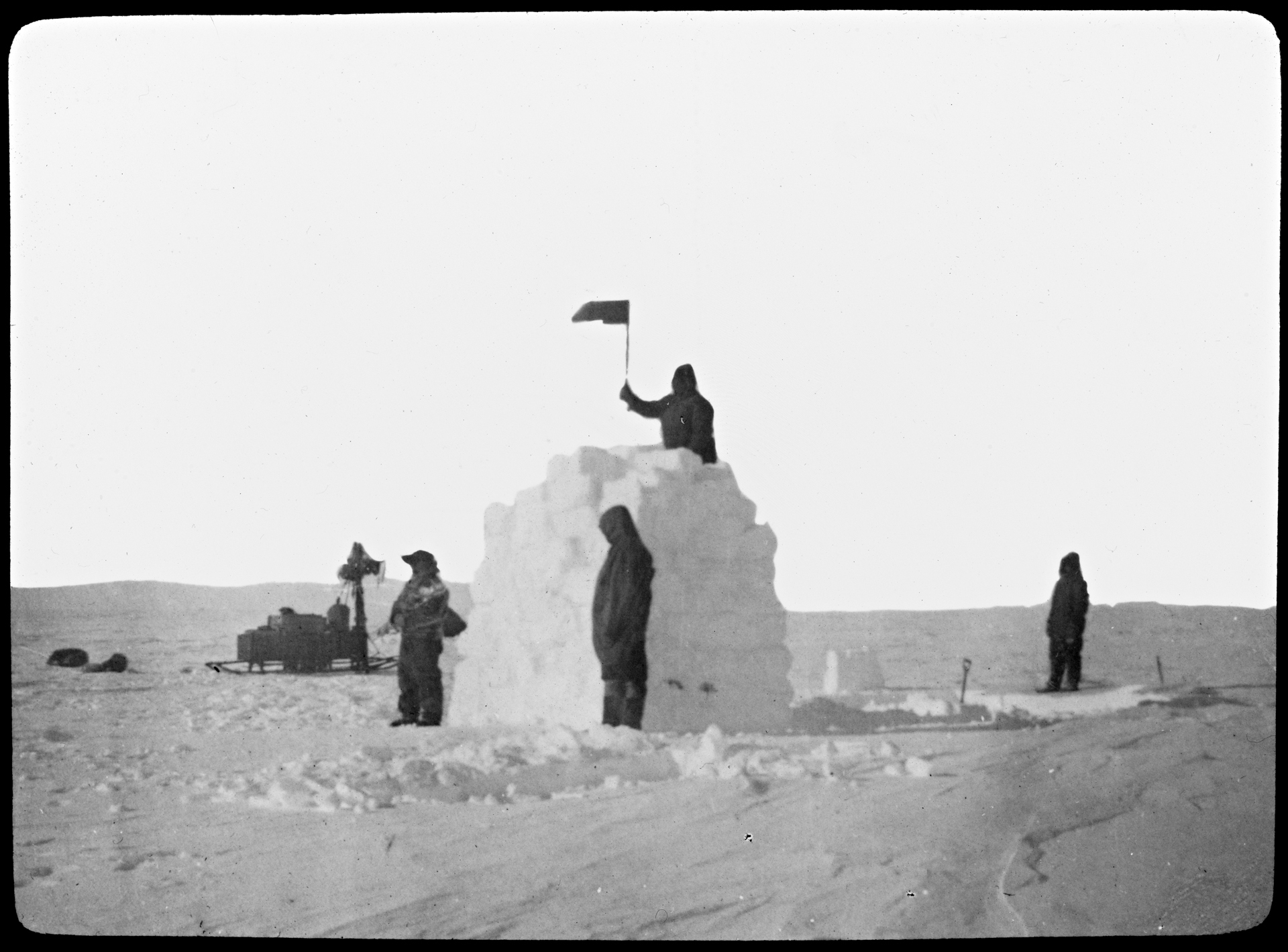
One of Amundsen's depots.

During depot laying in February 1911, Roald Amundsen had his first (and last) 290 kilometres (180 mi) of his route marked like a Norwegian ski course using marker flags initially every 13 kilometres (8 mi). He added to this by using food containers painted black, resulting in a marker every mile. From 82 degrees on, Amundsen built a 6 ft (1.8 m) cairn every three miles with a note inside recording the cairn's position, the distance to the next depot, and direction to the next cairn. In order not to miss a depot considering the snow and great distances, Amundsen took precautions. Each depot laid out up to 85 degrees (laid out every degree of latitude) and had a line of bamboo flags laid out transversely every half-mile for five miles on either side of the depot, ensuring that the returning party could locate the designated depot.

Scott relied on depots much less frequently laid out. For one distance where Amundsen laid seven depots, Scott laid only two. Routes were marked by the walls made at lunch and evening stops to protect the ponies. Depots had a single flag. As a result, Scott has much concern recorded in his diaries over route finding and experienced close calls about finding depots. It is also clear that Scott's team did not travel on several days, because the swirling snow hid their three-month-old outward tracks. With better depot and route marking they would have been able to travel on more days with a following wind, which would have filled the sail attached to their sledge and so travel further, and might have reached safety.

== Food and fuel ==
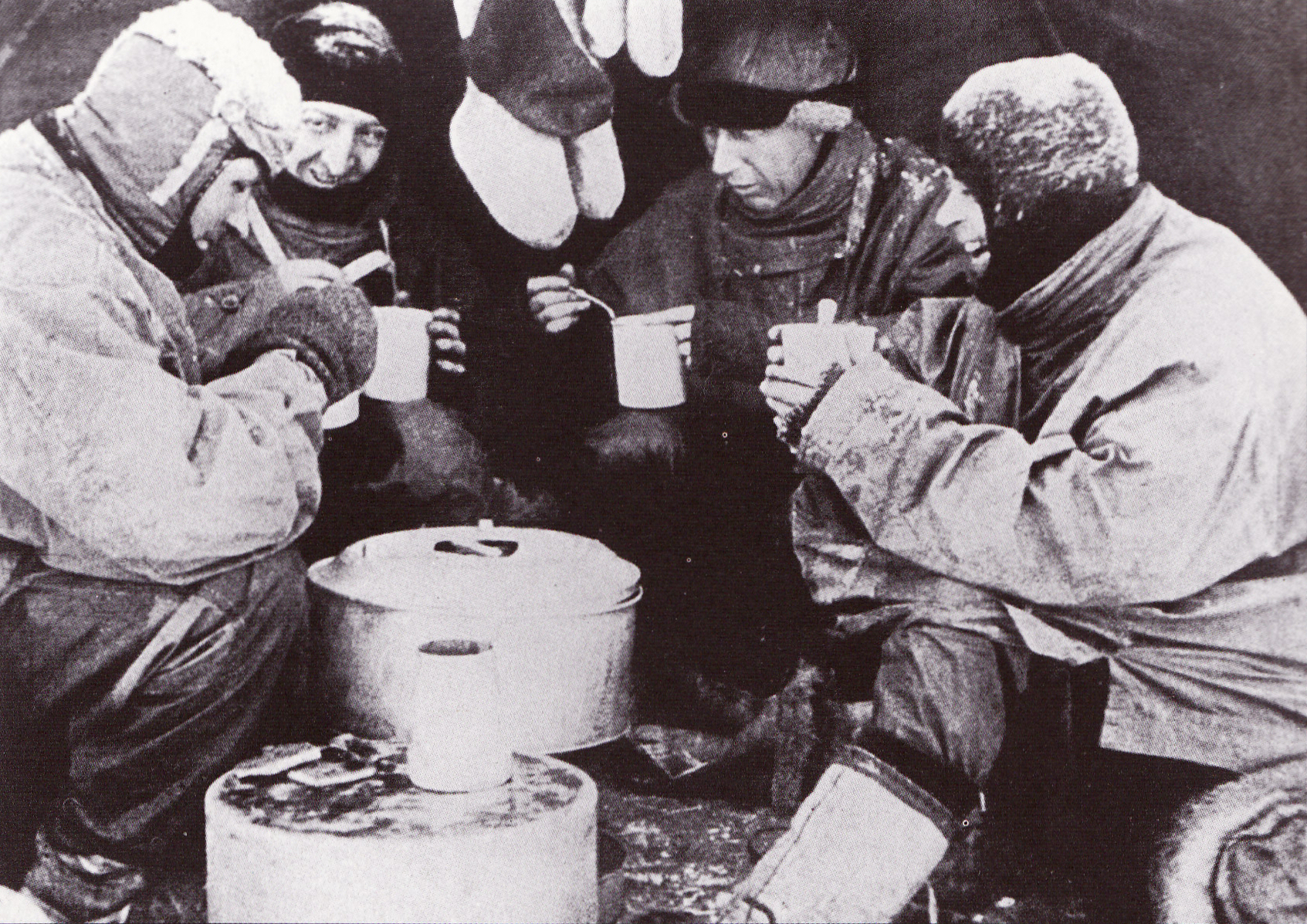
Evans, Bowers, Wilson and Scott having a meal

By the time they arrived at the pole, the health of Scott's team had significantly deteriorated, whereas Amundsen's team actually gained weight during the expedition. Although Scott's team managed to maintain the scheduled pace for most of the return leg and hence was virtually always on full rations, their condition continued to worsen rapidly (the only delay occurred when they were held for four days by a blizzard and had to open their summit rations early as a consequence.)

Apsley Cherry-Garrard in his analysis of the expedition estimated that even under optimistic assumptions the summit rations contained only a little more than half the calories actually required for the man-hauling of sledges. A carefully planned 2006 re-enactment of both Amundsen's and Scott's travels, sponsored by the BBC, confirmed Cherry-Garrard's theory. The British team had to abort their tour due to the severe weight loss of all members. The experts hinted that Scott's reports of unusually bad surfaces and weather conditions might in part have been due to their exhausted state which made them feel the sledge weights and the chill more severely.

Scott's calculations for the supply requirements were based on a number of expeditions, both by members of his team (e.g., Wilson's trip with Cherry-Garrard and Bowers to the Emperor penguin colony which had each man on a different type of experimental ration) and by Shackleton. Apparently, Scott did not take the strain of prolonged man-hauling at high altitudes sufficiently into account.

Since the rations contained no B and C vitamins, the only source of these vitamins during the trek was from the slaughter of ponies or dogs. This made the men progressively malnourished, manifested most clearly in the form of scurvy.

Scott also had to fight with a shortage of fuel due to leakage from stored fuel cans which used leather washers. This was a phenomenon that had been noticed previously by other expeditions, but Scott took no measures to prevent it. Amundsen, in contrast, had learned the lesson and had his fuel cans soldered closed. A fuel depot he left on Betty's Knoll was found 50 years later still full.

Dehydration may also have been a factor. Amundsen's team had plenty of fuel due to better planning and soldered fuel cans. Scott had a shortage of fuel and was unable to melt as much water as Amundsen. At the same time Scott's team were more physically active in man-hauling the sledges.

== Clothing and goggles ==
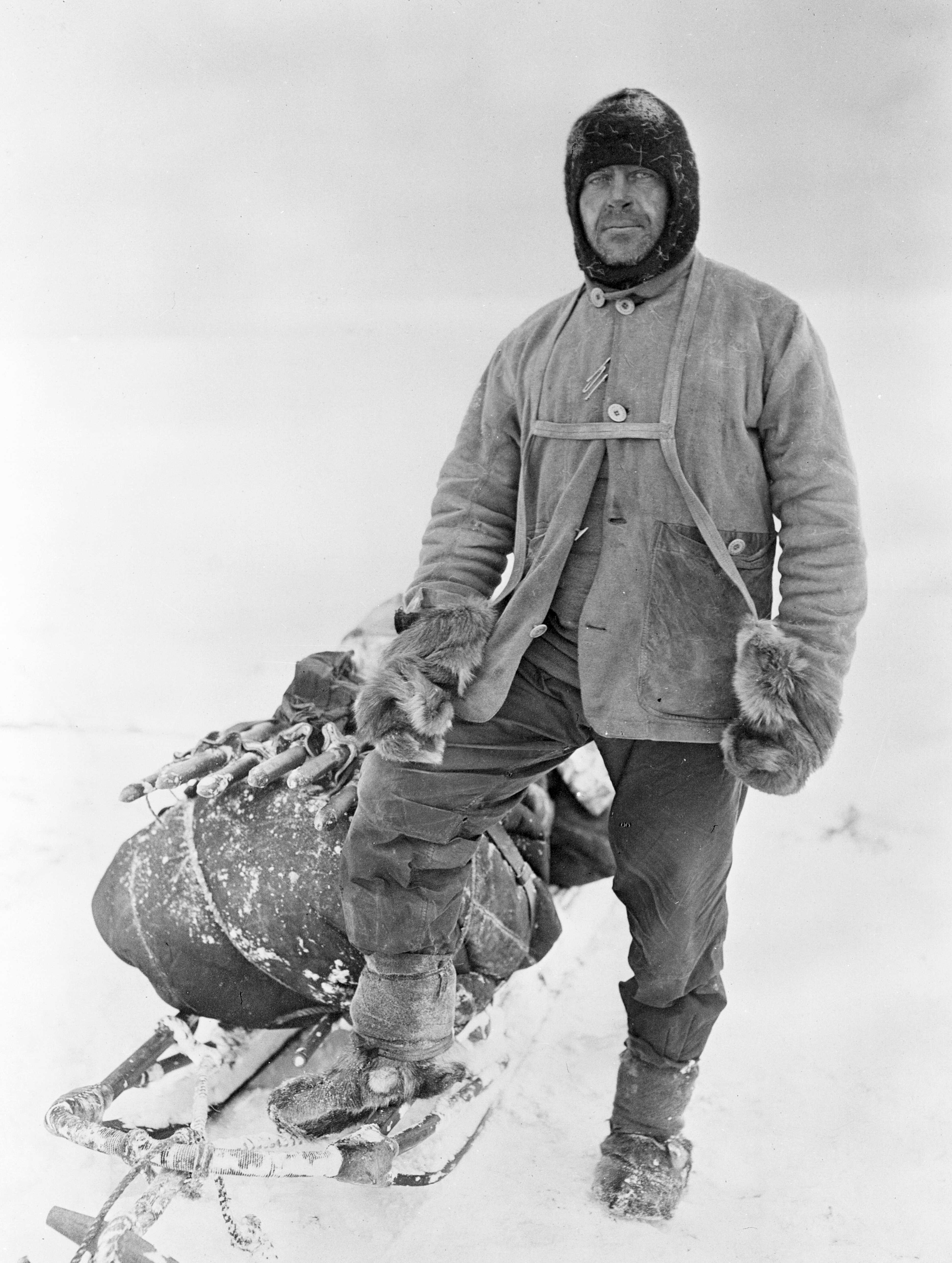
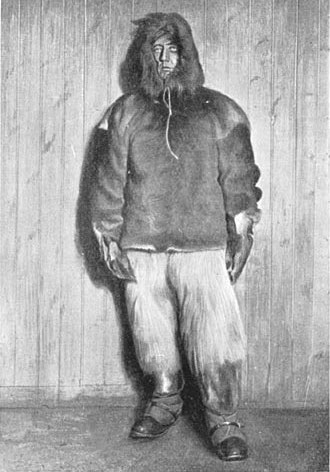
Scott's gear compared to Amundsen's furs

Explorer Ranulph Fiennes and others have asserted that Scott's team was appropriately dressed for man-hauling in their woolen and wind-proof clothing and that Amundsen's, because they were skiing, was appropriately dressed in Inuit-style fur garments. Skiing at the pace of a dog team is a strenuous activity, yet Amundsen never complained about the clothing being too hot. That is because the furs are worn loosely so air circulates and sweat evaporates. Scott's team, on the other hand, made regular complaints about the cold.

Amundsen's team did initially have problems with their boots. However, the depot-laying trips of January and February 1911 and an abortive departure to the South Pole on 8 September 1911 allowed changes to be made before it was too late.

Scott's team suffered regularly from snow blindness, which sometimes affected over half the team at any one time. By contrast, there was no recorded case of snow blindness during the whole of Amundsen's expedition. On the return journey, Amundsen's team rested during the "day" (when the sun was in front of them) and travelled during the "night" (when the sun was behind them) to minimise the effects of snow blindness.

== Delay in meeting Scott's returning party ==
In 1921, 'Teddy' Evans wrote in his book South with Scott that Scott had left the following written orders at Cape Evans.

About the first week of February I should like you to start your third journey to the South, the object being to hasten the return of the third Southern unit [the polar party] and give it a chance to catch the ship. The date of your departure must depend on news received from returning units, the extent of the depot of dog food you have been able to leave at One Ton Camp, the state of the dogs, etc ...It looks at present as though you should aim at meeting the returning party about 1 March in Latitude 82 or 82.30.

He did however place a lesser importance upon this journey than that of replenishing the food rations at One Ton Depot.

He continued his instructions in the next paragraph "You will of course understand that whilst the object of your third journey is important, that of the second is vital. At all hazards three X.S. units of provision must be got to One Ton Camp by the date named (19th January), and if the dogs are unable to perform this task, a man party must be organised." with that qualification he closed his notes regarding his instructions for the dogs.

Expedition member Apsley Cherry-Garrard did not mention Scott's order in his 1922 book The Worst Journey in the World. However in a postscript to his privately published 1948 edition, after Atkinson's and Lady Scott's deaths in 1929 and 1947 respectively, Cherry-Garrard acknowledged the existence of Scott's order and provided reasons why Atkinson, and later he himself, failed to comply: Atkinson was too exhausted at the beginning of February to set off to meet Scott, and the lack of dog food at One Ton Depot made a timely start impractical. Karen May of the Scott Polar Research Institute goes further by suggesting that the instruction about saving the dogs for the following season was Atkinson's own invention. Cherry-Garrard discusses Scott's order. Cherry-Garrard writes that he and Edward Atkinson reached Cape Evans on 28 January. Scott had estimated Atkinson would reach camp by 13 January. Atkinson, now the senior officer, discovered that the dog handler Cecil Meares had resigned from the expedition and that neither Meares nor anyone else had resupplied dog food to the depots. Cherry-Garrard also wrote "In my opinion he [Atkinson] would not have been fit to take out the dogs in the first week of February".

On 13 February, Atkinson set off on the first lap southwards to Hut Point with the dog assistant, Dimitri Gerov, and the dogs to avoid being cut off by disintegrating sea ice. Atkinson and Gerov were still at Hut Point when, on 19 February, Tom Crean arrived on foot from the Barrier and reported that Lt Edward Evans was lying seriously ill in a tent some 55 kilometres (35 mi) to the south and in urgent need of rescue. Atkinson decided that this mission was his priority and set out with the dogs to bring Evans back. This was achieved and the party was back at Hut Point on 22 February.

Atkinson sent a note back to the Cape Evans base camp, requesting either the meteorologist Wright or Cherry-Garrard to take over the task of meeting Scott with the dogs. Chief meteorologist Simpson was unwilling to release Wright from his scientific work and Atkinson therefore selected Apsley Cherry-Garrard. It was still not in Atkinson's mind that Cherry-Garrard's was a relief mission and, according to Cherry-Garrard's account, told him to "use his judgement" as to what to do in the event of not meeting the polar party by One Ton, and that Scott's orders were that the dogs must not be risked. Cherry-Garrard left Hut Point with Dimitri and two dog teams on 26 February, arriving at One Ton Depot on 4 March and depositing the extra rations. Scott was not there. With supplies for themselves and the dogs for twenty-four days, they had about eight days' time before having to return to Hut Point. The alternative to waiting was moving southwards for another four days. Any travel beyond that, in the absence of the dog food depot, would mean killing dogs for dog food as they went along, thus breaching Atkinson's "not to be risked" order. Cherry-Garrard argued that the weather was too poor for further travel, with daytime temperatures as low as −37 °F (−38 °C), and that he might miss Scott if leaving the depot, and thus decided to wait for Scott. On 10 March, in worsening weather and with his own supplies dwindling, Cherry-Garrard and Gerov turned for home. apparently mostly in blizzard conditions (although no blizzard was recorded by Scott some 100 miles further south until 10 March), and returned to Hut Point on 16 March, in poor physical condition and without news of the polar party. Meanwhile, Scott's team were fighting for their lives less than 70 miles (113 km) away. Atkinson would later write, "I am satisfied that no other officer of the expedition could have done better". Cherry-Garrard was troubled for the rest of his life by thoughts that he might have taken other actions that could have saved the polar party.

On the return journey from the pole, Scott reached the 82.30°S meeting point for the dog teams three days ahead of schedule, around 27 February 1912. Scott's diary for that day notes "We are naturally always discussing possibility of meeting dogs, where and when, etc. It is a critical position. We may find ourselves in safety at the next depot, but there is a horrid element of doubt." By 10 March it became clear that the dog teams were not coming: "The dogs which would have been our salvation have evidently failed. Meares [the dog-driver] had a bad trip home I suppose. It's a miserable jumble."

Around 25 March, awaiting death in his tent at latitude 79.40°S, Scott speculated, in a farewell letter to his expedition treasurer Sir Edgar Speyer, that he had overshot the meeting point with the dog relief teams, writing "We very nearly came through, and it's a pity to have missed it, but lately I have felt that we have overshot our mark. No-one is to blame and I hope no attempt will be made to suggest that we had lacked support."

== Other reasons for Scott's failure ==
=== Geology samples ===
Scott's team continued to haul over 14 kg (30 lb) of rock samples. This would appear to be a major handicap when pulling a sledge in a race against the weather and a shortage of food and fuel. Scott could have left the samples at one of the cairns along the way to be picked up later. However, Ranulph Fiennes has suggested that the extra weight would not have been a major handicap. Tryggve Gran on the other hand thought "they might have saved themselves the bother".

=== Final five-man team ===
Scott's planning, equipment and rations had been based on three sledge teams of four men ascending the Beardmore, with a team turning back every 10 days or so as rations required, finally leaving one four-man team to attempt the pole. At the last moment, when down to two teams (Scott's and Evans's), Scott decided to send a returning party of three and take on five. This increased the cooking time for the team of five and affected the fuel supply. It also meant the Evans party of three had to try to split the ration pack (at a time when they were cold and tired and later when one member was suffering from scurvy) to leave an allowance for the fifth man in Scott's party. This also will have affected the seepage of fuel from cans which were opened and then re-closed and left for several weeks before Scott's team got to them. Moreover, for some unexplained reason Scott had ordered Evans's team to cache their skis a week before, so Bowers (the fifth man) walked to the pole and back to the cached skis (360 miles) while the rest of Scott's team skied.

=== Navigation ===
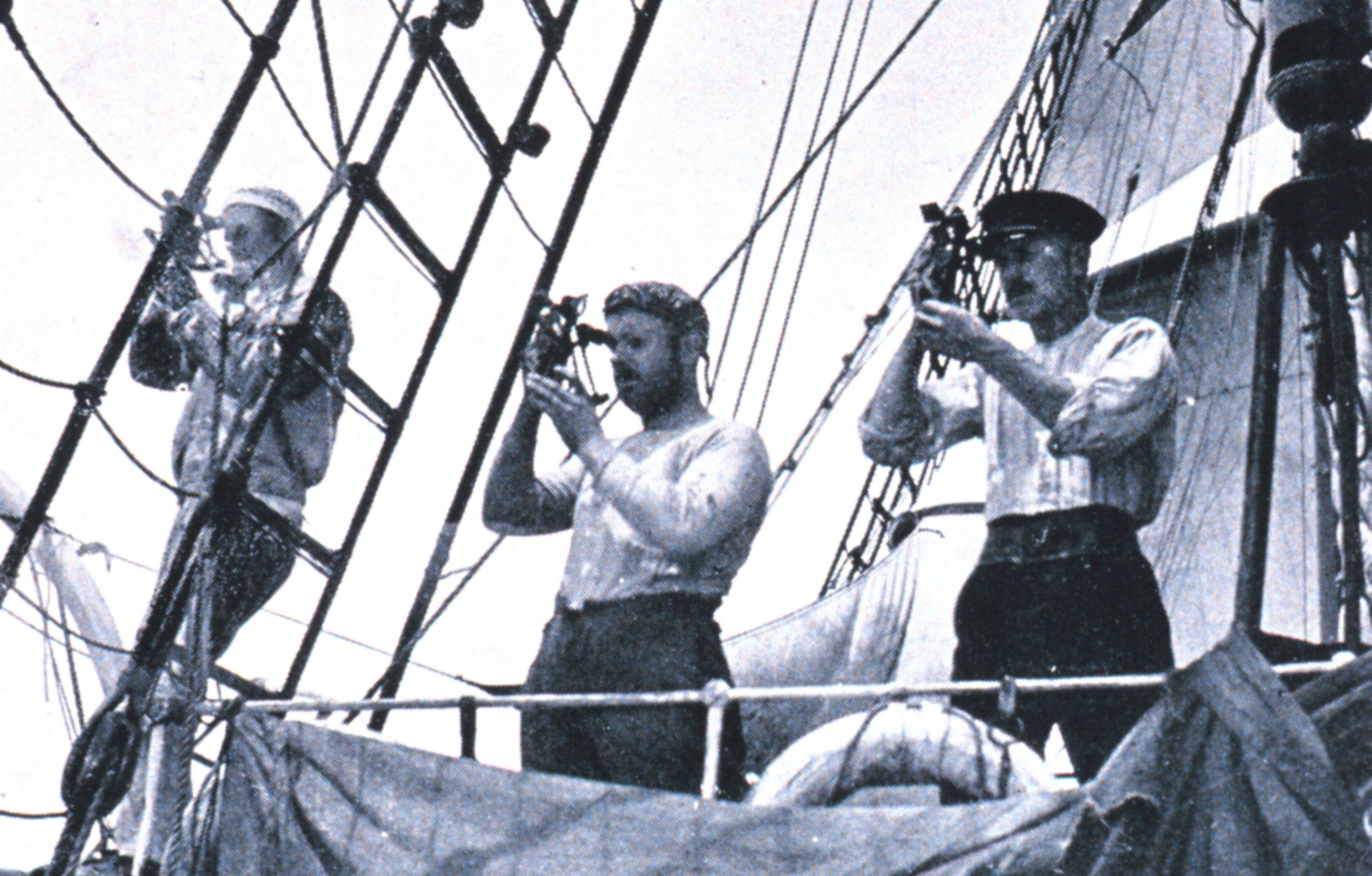
Amundsen's crew taking an observation.

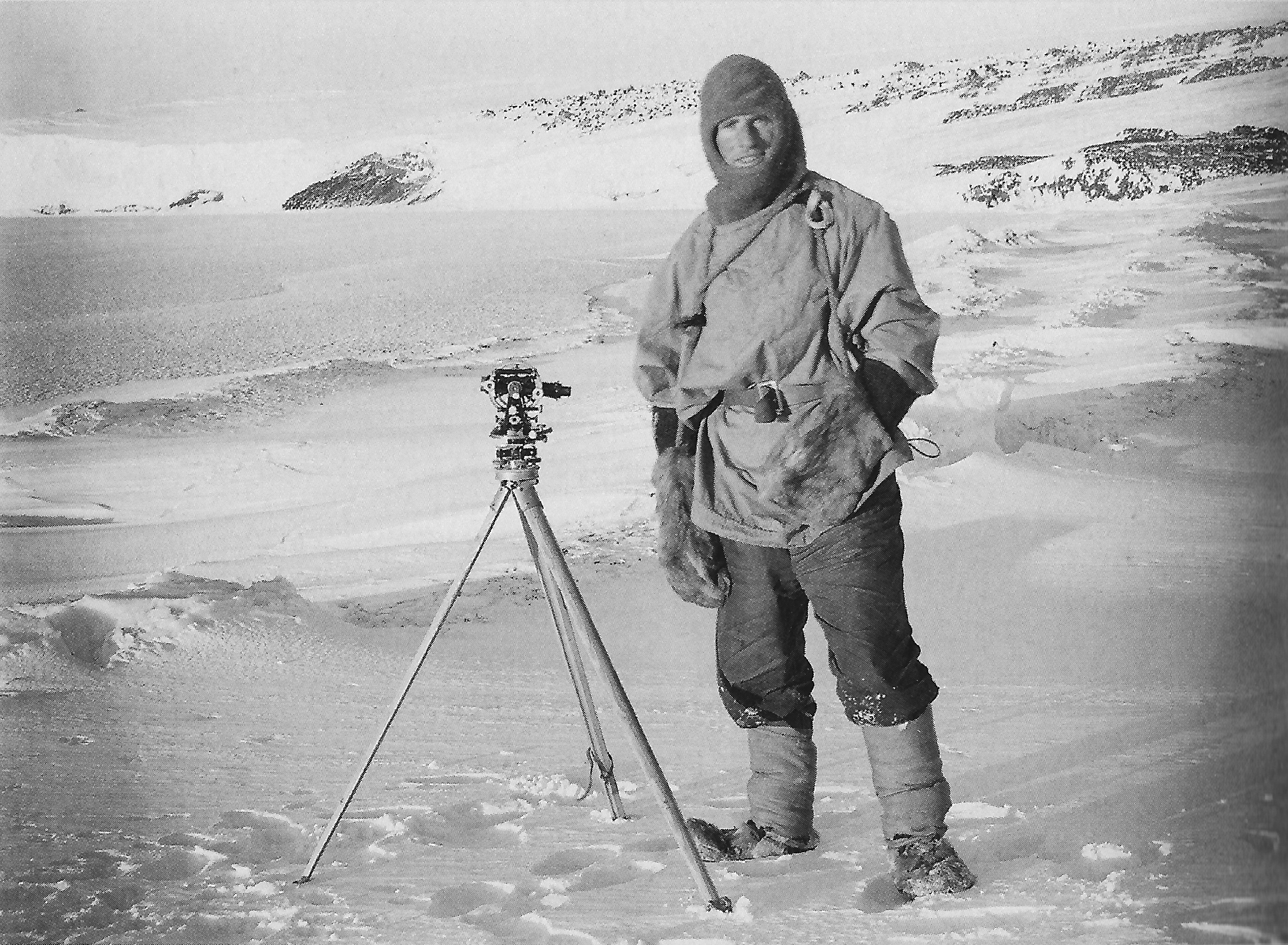
Evans with a theodolite.

Amundsen used prepared navigation sheets that simplified the calculations for his team when they were tired and cold. Four out of his team of five were qualified navigators. Amundsen's expedition also used a sextant during the journey, which is a relatively light and simple piece of equipment. He also attended a symposium that reviewed how to fix position at high latitudes. Scott used a theodolite which is heavier and requires more mental arithmetic. Scott also lacked navigators having only one per team. Scott dismissed Cherry-Garrard's request for navigational training and Wilson only attempted to learn how to read latitudes at the last moment.

=== Camp routine ===
Amundsen used canisters that left his sledges permanently lashed and loaded. Scott's team had to unload, and load and re-lash their sledge at every camp, no matter what the weather.

== Timelines of Amundsen and Scott expeditions ==
Event	Amundsen Expedition	Scott Expedition	Comments
Expedition announcement	1910-09-09	1909-09-13	Amundsen keeps his South Pole ambitions secret after learning that Cook and Peary claimed the North Pole in 1908/9. He only discloses his actual plans from Madeira on his southbound journey.
Departure for 'the south'	1910-06-31	1910-06-16	Amundsen's Fram departs Kristiania, Norway officially bound for the North Pole. Scott's Terra Nova departs Cardiff, Wales for the South Pole.
Arrival in the Antarctic	1911-01-14	1911-01-04	Terra Nova trapped in ice for 20 days
Base camp	Bay of Whales, 78° 30' S	Cape Evans, 77° 38' S	Amundsen's route through unknown land Scott's route the same as that charted by Shackleton until 88° 23' S
Distance to the pole	1,334 kilometres (829 mi; 720 nmi)	1,445 kilometres (898 mi; 780 nmi)	Amundsen 111 kilometres (69 mi; 60 nmi) closer to the pole
Furthest south depot	82° S	79° 29' S	Scott latest depot a good 30 kilometres (19 mi; 16 nmi) less south than planned, possibly detrimental on their return.
Expedition start	1911-10-20	1911-11-01	Amundsen 11 days ahead of Scott
80° S	1911-10-23	1911-11-18	1,112 kilometres (691 mi; 600 nmi) to the pole, Amundsen 26 days ahead
81° S	1911-10-31	1911-11-23	1,001 kilometres (622 mi; 540 nmi) to the pole, Amundsen 23 days ahead
82° S	1911-11-05	1911-11-28	890 kilometres (550 mi; 480 nmi) to the pole, Amundsen 23 days ahead
83° S	1911-11-09	1911-12-02	778 kilometres (483 mi; 420 nmi) to the pole. Amundsen 23 days ahead
84° S	1911-11-13	1911-12-15	667 kilometres (414 mi; 360 nmi) to the pole, Amundsen 32 days ahead
85° S	1911-11-17	1911-12-21	556 kilometres (345 mi; 300 nmi) to the pole, Amundsen 34 days ahead
86° S	1911-11-27	1911-12-26	445 kilometres (277 mi; 240 nmi) to the pole, Amundsen 29 days ahead
87° S	1911-12-04	1912-01-01	334 kilometres (208 mi; 180 nmi) to the pole, Amundsen 27 days ahead
88° S	1911-12-06	1912-01-06	222 kilometres (138 mi; 120 nmi) to the pole, Amundsen 31 days ahead
88° 23' S	1911-12-07	1912-01-09	180 kilometres (110 mi; 97 nmi) to the pole Amundsen 33 days ahead Southernmost point reached by Shackleton, 1909-01-09.
89° S	1911-12-10	1912-01-13	112 kilometres (70 mi; 60 nmi) to the pole, Amundsen 34 days ahead
89° 46' S	1911-12-13	1912-01-16	25 kilometres (16 mi; 13 nmi) to the pole, Scott finds the first proof of Amundsen
The Pole, 90° S	1911-12-14, 15:00	1912-01-17, 18:30	Reached the South Pole, Amundsen 34 days ahead of Scott
Termination	1912-01-25, 04:00: Amundsen's expedition returns to base camp after 99 days en route and no casualties, after a round-trip of approx. 3,440 kilometres (2,140 mi; 1,860 nmi).	Scott's expedition dies on return journey 1912-02-17: Evans dies at 84°S; 1912-03-16: Oates dies at 80°30′ 1912-03-19: Final camp of Scott, Wilson and Bowers at 79°40′, 11 Nm (18 km) short of One Ton Depot at 79° 29' S 1912-03-29: Approximate date of Scott, Wilson and Bowers dying, 150 days after embarking 1912-11-12: Bodies found by the search party of Tryggve Gran.	
Departure from the Antarctic	1912-01-30	1913-01-26	
Expedition fate known to public	1912-03-08: Amundsen sends a telegram from Hobart, Tasmania informing the world that he reached the South Pole	1913-02-10: The world is informed of the tragedy when Terra Nova reaches Oamaru, New Zealand	
