= Nigel Pullman =

British officer and executive

Nigel Reginald Pullman JP (born 1947) is a former British Army officer and newspaper executive. In 2012–13, he was one of the two Sheriffs of the City of London.

== Biography ==
Pullman was educated at Sherborne School before going to the Royal Military Academy Sandhurst. He was commissioned into the Royal Corps of Signals in 1968, serving with the Brigade of Gurkhas and the United Nations in Cyprus (1974–75). He was promoted to the rank of captain before leaving regular military service. He then joined the Inns of Court & City Yeomanry (Territorial Army), retiring in 1988. In 2016, he was appointed Honorary Colonel of 68 (Inns of Court & City Yeomanry) Signal Squadron and of the Band of The Royal Yeomanry (Inns of Court and City Yeomanry). He was appointed to Her Majesty's Commission of Lieutenancy for the City of London in 2014.

After the army, Pullman worked for the Financial Times (1979–96) before becoming clerk to the Worshipful Company of World Traders (1997–2008). He was Master of the Leathersellers' Company for 2010–11 and Sheriff of the City of London in 2012–13. In retirement, he was chairman of the City of London Livery Committee (2013–16), a governor of Colfe's School in Lewisham (2002–16), and is clerk of the City & Metropolitan Welfare Charities, as well as a number of other voluntary roles in the charity and livery world.

== Honours and decorations ==
- UN Cyprus Medal

== Arms ==
Coat of arms of Nigel Pullman

Crest
A Dolphin hauriant Argent eyed langued finned and scaled Gules resting the fins on a Sword point downwards Argent hilt and pommel Or
Escutcheon
Carnation two Pallets Argent over all a Roebuck passant reguardant Gules attired and unguled Sable resting the dexter forehoof on a Ship's Wheel Azure
Motto
Coniuncti Fortiores
