= Odd Grønvold =

Norwegian royal servant

Odd Grønvold (8 September 1907 – 18 February 1992) was a Norwegian royal servant.

He was born in Kristiania, and was a grandnephew of the former private secretary to King Haakon VII of Norway, Hans Aimar Mow Grønvold. He was hired as secretary to Crown Prince Olav of Norway in 1954, and when Olav ascended the monarch's throne in 1957, Grønvold was hired as court marshal. In this position he assisted lord chamberlain Ingvald Smith-Kielland, who had left the marshal office in 1955. Grønvold was later promoted to lord chamberlain, serving from 1966 to 1985. He was decorated with the Grand Cross of the Order of St. Olav in 1982.

He was married to Ellinor Grønvold, who served as lady-in-waiting since 1956. In 1958 the entire court of the Norwegian royal family comprised as little as seven people; Smith-Kielland, Odd and Ellinor Grønvold, Richard Andvord, Else Werring, Ingeborg von Hanno and Vincent Bommen.
