= Worshipful Company of Feltmakers =

Livery company of the City of London

The Worshipful Company of Feltmakers is one of the ancient livery companies of the City of London.

The Feltmakers, or makers of felt hats, were incorporated by letters patent granted by James I in 1604, receiving an extended royal charter in 1667. The Company gradually lost its role as a trade association for felt hat makers, due to both advancements in technology and the increased popularity of silk hats. Like many City livery companies, the Feltmakers' Company is now primarily a charitable institution, but has numerous milliners amongst its members.

Ranking sixty-third in the order of precedence for City livery companies, the Feltmakers' Company motto is Decus Et Tutamen, a Latin phrase taken from Virgil meaning An Ornament and a Safeguard. (The phrase also appears around the milled edge of certain pound coins.)

The Company's Master is Peter Winfield, who was installed as the 423rd Master Feltmaker on 2 October 2026. Masters normally serve for one year. The Company's Upper Warden is Simon Wood and its Clerk is Squadron Leader Hazel Ewen.

== See also ==
- Worshipful Company of Haberdashers
