= Baron Mountevans =

Barony in the Peerage of the United Kingdom

Baron Mountevans, of Chelsea in the County of London, is a title in the Peerage of the United Kingdom, created in 1945 in favour of the celebrated Antarctic explorer, Admiral Sir Edward Evans. As of 2017 the title is held by his grandson, the fourth Baron, who succeeded his brother in 2014.

== Barons Mountevans (1945) ==
- Edward Ratcliffe Garth Russell Evans, 1st Baron Mountevans (1881–1957)
- Richard Andvord Evans, 2nd Baron Mountevans (1918–1974)
- Edward Patrick Broke Evans, 3rd Baron Mountevans (1943–2014)
- Jeffrey Richard de Corban Evans, 4th Baron Mountevans (b. 1948)

The heir apparent is the present holder's son, the Hon. Alexander Richard Andvord Evans (b. 1975).

== Line of succession ==
- Admiral Edward Ratcliffe Garth Russell Evans, 1st Baron Mountevans (1881–1958)
  - Richard Andvord Evans, 2nd Baron Mountevans (1918–1974)
    - Edward Patrick Broke Evans, 3rd Baron Mountevans (1943–2014)
    - Jeffrey de Corban Richard Evans, 4th Baron Mountevans (b. 1948)
      - (1) Hon. Alexander Richard Andvord Evans (b. 1975)
      - (2) Hon. Julian James Rowntree Evans (b. 1977)
  - Hon. Edward Broke Evans (1924 - 2007)
    - (3) Julian Phillip Broke Evans (b. 1956)
    - (4) William Garth Evans (b. 1959)

== Arms ==
Coat of arms of Baron Mountevans
Crest Between two cross crosslets fitchee Sable a demi lion erased reguardant Or holding between the paws a boar's head also Sable. Escutcheon Argent two bars wavy Azure between three boars' heads Sable. Supporters On either side a king penguin Proper. Motto Libertas
