= Edward Evans, 1st Baron Mountevans =

Royal Navy Admiral (1880–1957)

Admiral The Right Honourable The Lord Mountevans KCB DSO SGM
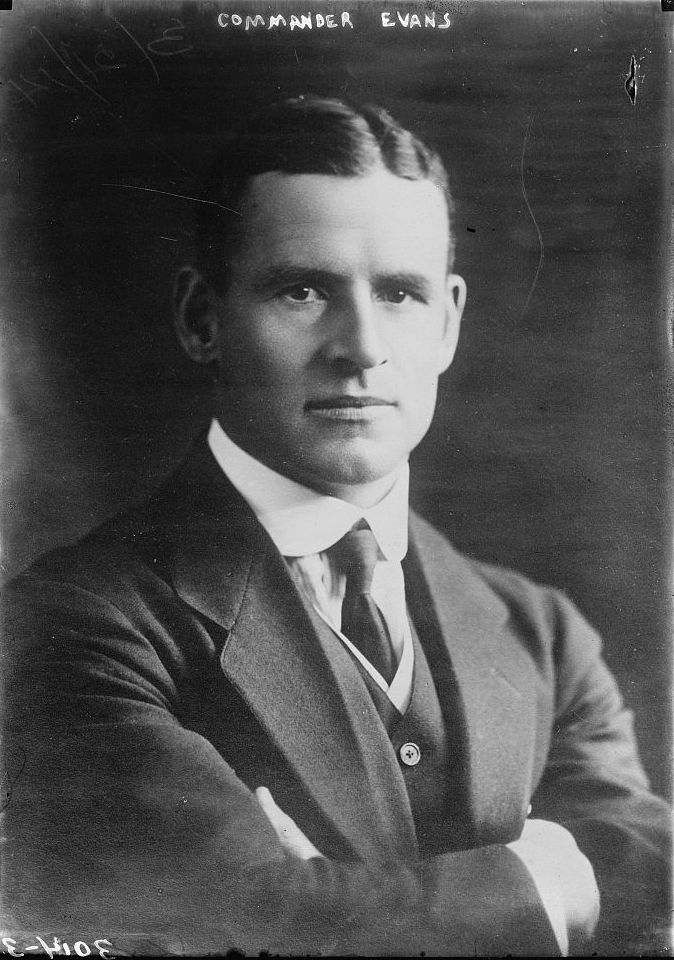
- Born: 28 October 1880; London, England
- Died: 20 August 1957 (aged 76); Gålå, Norway
- Spouse(s): Hilda Russell (m. 1904; died 1913); Elsa Andvord (m. 1916)
- Military career
- Allegiance: United Kingdom
- Branch: Royal Navy
- Service years: 1896–1941
- Rank: Admiral
- Nickname: "Teddy"
- Commands: Nore Command (1935–1939); Africa Station (1933–1935); HM Australian Squadron (1929–1931); HMS Repulse (1926–1927); RN Minesweeping and Fishery Protection Flotilla (1923–1926); HMS Carlisle (1921–1922); HMS Broke (1917); HMS Viking (1915); HMS Mohawk (1914); British Antarctic Expedition (1913)
- Conflicts: First World War: Battle of Dover Strait; Second World War
- Awards: Knight Commander of the Order of the Bath; Distinguished Service Order; Knight of the Order of St John; Sea Gallantry Medal; Mentioned in Despatches; Grand Officer of the Order of the Tower and Sword (Portugal); Commander of the Royal Norwegian Order of St Olaf; War Medal (Norway); Commander of the Order of the Belgian Crown (Belgium); Officer of the Order of Leopold (Belgium); Officer of the Legion of Honour (France); Croix de Guerre (France); Knight of the Military Order of Savoy (Italy); Navy Cross (United States)
- Other work: London Regional Commissioner for Civil Defence (1939–1945); Special Naval Attaché to Norway (1940); Younger Brother of Trinity House

Admiral Edward Ratcliffe Garth Russell Evans, 1st Baron Mountevans, KCB, DSO, SGM (28 October 1880 – 20 August 1957) was a Royal Navy officer and Antarctic explorer.

Evans was seconded from the navy to the Discovery expedition to Antarctica in 1901–1904, when he served on the crew of the relief ship, and afterwards began planning his own Antarctic expedition. However, he suspended this plan when offered the post of second-in-command on Robert Falcon Scott's ill-fated Terra Nova expedition to the South Pole in 1910–1913, as captain of the expedition ship Terra Nova. He accompanied Scott to within 150 miles of the Pole, but was sent back in command of the last supporting party. On the return he became seriously ill with scurvy and only narrowly survived.

After the expedition Evans toured the country giving lectures, and returned to his naval duties as a commander in the summer of 1914. He spent the First World War as a destroyer captain, becoming famous as "Evans of the Broke" after the battle of Dover Strait in 1917. He commanded a cruiser at Hong Kong in 1921–1922, where he was awarded a medal for his role in rescuing passengers from the wrecked vessel Hong Moh, and then spent several years commanding the Home Fisheries Protection Squadron before being given command of the modern battlecruiser HMS Repulse. He later commanded the Australian Squadron and the Africa Station before becoming Commander-in-Chief, The Nore, one of the Navy's senior Home Commands; during this time, unusually for a serving officer, he was also Rector of the University of Aberdeen.

After four years at the Nore, Evans handed over command in early 1939, and was appointed Civil Defence Commissioner for London during the preparations for the Second World War; after the German invasion of Norway he travelled there to liaise with King Haakon VII, a personal acquaintance. He remained in a civil defence role throughout the War, though he had officially retired from the Navy in 1941, and was raised to the peerage in 1945, sitting in the House of Lords as a Labour member.

== Early life ==
Edward Ratcliffe Garth Russell Evans, known to his family and friends as "Teddy", was born in London on 28 October 1880, at a mews near Berkeley Square. He was the second of three sons born to Frank Evans and his wife Eliza, née McNulty. Frank Evans, a young barrister at Lincoln's Inn, hailed from a large Lancashire family of Welsh descent; his father had been a provision merchant in Oldham. Eliza McNulty's family were of Irish origin and lived at Deptford.

The family were respectably middle-class, but the three Evans children did not behave as respectably as might be expected; when Edward was nine, he and his brothers frequently roamed far into the East End, on one occasion being detained by the police after a theft. Edward and his older brother Joe were admitted to the Merchant Taylors' School in 1890, when he was ten, and were expelled for fighting and truancy a year later. He was then sent to a relatively modern school in the countryside near Croydon, which aimed to educate "troublesome boys"; despite being the youngest boy and often victimised and homesick, he enjoyed the rural environment and responded well to the teaching. He later attended a school in Maida Vale where he obtained high marks but slipped back into his old misbehaviour; the headmaster responded by making him a prefect, which shocked Evans into self-discipline. He became one of the school's star performers, with a string of prizes, before leaving at 14.

Evans sought a career at sea, and while at school had tried, but failed, to obtain a cadetship with the Royal Navy training ship HMS Britannia. The alternatives open to him were to be "crammed" by an expensive tutor and resit the Britannia examination, or to attend the cheaper privately run training ship HMS Worcester, which mainly trained officers for the Merchant Navy. His father chose the latter, and Evans joined the Worcester in January 1895. He was heavily bullied, but by the middle of his second year had found his place, and gained a reputation as an able and diligent – if still troublesome – cadet. He won several prizes, culminating in a coveted Navy cadetship in his final year.

As a Midshipman Evans was posted to the cruiser HMS Hawke in the Mediterranean in 1897, a ship noted for her immaculate presentation and strict conduct, which was not entirely to Evans' taste. In August he became seriously ill with brucellosis, after drinking contaminated milk, and was sent home to recover for three months. During this time, he gained a lasting fanaticism for physical fitness, walking forty or fifty miles in a day and swimming for hours in the sea; he would maintain this state of fitness for decades to come. After returning to duty, he was posted to the battleship HMS Repulse and then the sloop HMS Dolphin, following which he was examined and passed as a sub-lieutenant. He then studied at the Royal Naval College, Greenwich, interrupted with a posting to HMS Majestic, where he first encountered then-Lieutenant Robert Falcon Scott.

== First Antarctic expedition, 1902–1904 ==
In July 1901, the British National Antarctic Expedition – the "Discovery Expedition" – sailed from London aboard RRS Discovery, with Scott in command. Part of the planning for the expedition had provided for a relief ship to follow a year later, in case Discovery was lost in the Antarctic; on reading a newspaper article about this some months later, Evans saw an opportunity for adventure and wrote to Sir Clements Markham, the organising force behind the expedition. He met Markham twice in the following weeks, and made a strong impression. In early 1902, Evans was seconded from the Navy to be second officer aboard the relief ship, the SY Morning, an ageing ex-whaler.

The Morning sailed from London in July 1902, and after a severe storm and a refit in Christchurch, New Zealand, headed for the Antarctic on 6 December to search for the expedition in their winter quarters, somewhere in the Ross Sea. After working steadily south-east from Cape Adare and along the ice-front to Cape Crozier, the limit of their search range, they found a message from the expedition, directing them back towards McMurdo Sound. Here the two crews met – the two ships were separated by fifteen miles of ice, requiring long sledge journeys – with Evans among the first party to greet the Discovery's crew. A week later, Scott, Ernest Shackleton, and Edward Wilson returned from their journey inland, sick with scurvy and snow-blindness, but triumphant at having reached 82°17′S, a new "Farthest South". Evans privately recorded that having known the three was "a great thing in my life". While in the Antarctic, Evans was promoted to lieutenant on 31 December 1902.

At the end of March 1903 the Morning was ordered to return, leaving supplies with the Discovery, still sealed in the ice. Several crew were exchanged, including Shackleton, who was considered not healthy enough to remain for the winter, though personal conflicts with Scott may have played a part in the decision. Once back in New Zealand, Evans applied for a temporary posting to HMS Phoebe stationed in the country, while the Morning was refitted for another relief voyage, this time organised by the Admiralty rather than the Royal Geographical Society. She sailed south again in November, in company with a second relief ship, Terra Nova, and met the Discovery in January 1904. Evans was given charge of a party of men laying explosives to blast a channel through eight miles of ice, which they achieved in eleven days, bringing the Discovery out just before a heavy gale struck. In recognition of his work with the expedition, Scott named a mountain overlooking the Sound as Mount Evans.

Shortly before sailing south for the second time, Evans' engagement to a New Zealand woman, Hilda Russell, had been announced. Hilda was the daughter of T. G. Russell, a prominent local solicitor, and the niece of George Russell, one of the Members of Parliament for the Christchurch area. Evans arrived back in Christchurch on 1 April 1904, and the couple were married on 13 April. They arrived back in England in October, where Evans was awarded the Bronze Polar Medal and rejoined the navy, specialising as a navigation officer. In 1907 he briefly considered applying to join Shackleton's Antarctic expedition, but decided instead that it was important to spend more time in his naval career, to avoid limiting his future prospects.

== Second Antarctic expedition, 1910–1913 ==
In 1909, Evans finally succumbed to the lure of the Antarctic, and announced – with Markham's blessing – that he would organise an expedition to explore King Edward VII Land. He planned an expedition to the Pole, but as a secondary objective; "the circum-navigation of the great Antarctic continent appealed to me far more". Evans initially sought support in Cardiff for a Welsh National Antarctic Expedition. Around the same time, Scott began planning a new expedition in response to Shackleton's recently completed Nimrod Expedition – the two were by this time rivals – and on hearing of this Evans abandoned his own project, transferring his funding and support to Scott. In return, Scott appointed him second-in-command. Evans brought so much Cardiff and Welsh sponsorship that Scott named Cardiff the home port of the expedition ship, Terra Nova and made Evans Captain. Despite this partnership, the two were never close, with the clash between Scott's reserve and Evans' openness accentuated by the difference in rank and age. Scott later described Evans in his diary as carried by "boyish enthusiasms" and "well-meaning, but terribly slow to learn", deeming that he was much more capable as a sailor than an explorer on land, and probably would never be suited to command his own expedition.

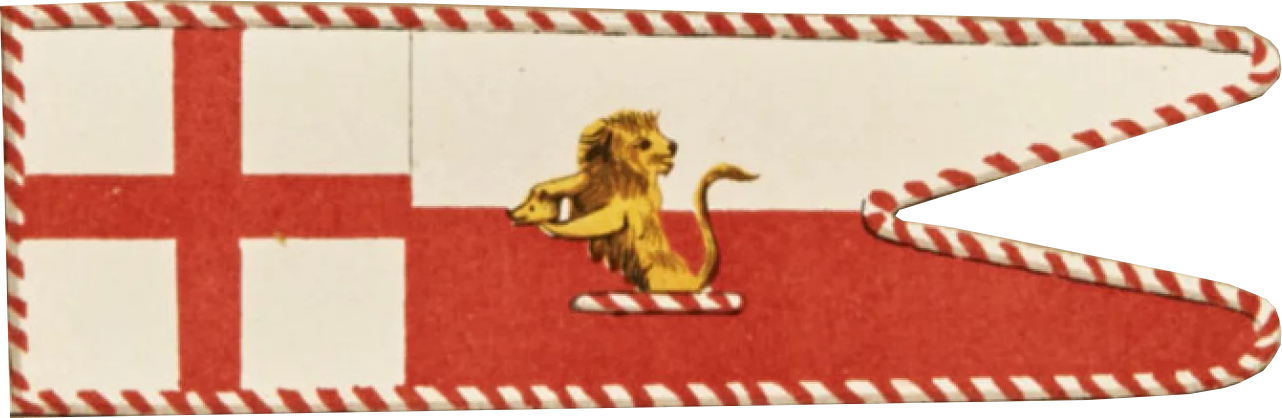
Sledge flag used by Evans in Antarctica during the Terra Nova Expedition

The expedition landed on the west side of Ross Island on 4 January 1911, at a site Scott named Cape Evans in Evans' honour. Evans joined the main shore party, leaving the Terra Nova in the hands of Lieutenant Harry Pennell, and worked to establish a series of depots along the Great Ice Barrier for the use of the Polar expedition later in the year. After wintering in the Cape Evans hut, the party began to prepare for the main journey in August and September. Evans was given command of the Motor Party, which was to leave first, taking four men and two tracked motor sledges south onto the Barrier with supplies for the main expedition, which would follow with dogs and ponies.

In the event, the motor sledges failed to work as planned; the engines proved unreliable, frequently refusing to start until heated, or stopping after a short distance. The first broke down permanently on 30 October, five days after starting, and the second followed a day later. The four men reorganised their loads and pushed south pulling a single sledge with 740 pounds (340 kg) of equipment and supplies. They managed about the same speed as before the breakdown, and made the rendezvous six days ahead of the main party, who caught up with them on 21 November. Two of Evans' party (the motor mechanic and an assistant) returned north, and the Motor Party was reorganised as the "Man-hauling Party". with Evans leading Chief Stoker Lashly, Surgeon-Lieutenant Atkinson and C. S. Wright, a Canadian physicist. The group pushed onwards until 5 December, when they were halted by a blizzard for four days, working through their supplies but unable to press south. The remaining ponies from the main expedition had to be shot before moving on. On arriving at the Beardmore Glacier on 10 December, their route off the Barrier, the dog parties were also sent back, leaving the entire expedition to be man-hauled.

At this point, the expedition was made up of three groups of four men, all man-hauling their sledges. However, two of the groups were relatively rested, whilst Evans and Lashly had been pulling a sledge since 1 November. This began to tell, with the group dropping behind and causing tensions with Scott, who grew frustrated and impatient with Evans' perceived carelessness and disorganisation. On 20 December, the first supporting party turned back, leaving eight men to press onwards; Evans' team was reorganised comprising himself, Lieutenant Bowers, Lashly, and Petty Officer Crean. On 3 January, Scott announced that Evans would not continue to the Pole, but would take his team, the Last Supporting Party, back north. Evans privately attributed this to his physical exhaustion – he and Lashly had pulled a loaded sledge for six hundred miles by this stage – and recorded his reactions stoically, though Bowers described him as "frightfully cut up". The groups parted emotionally on 4 January, and Evans, Lashly and Crean turned to head back, only 160 miles (260 km) from the Pole – Bowers had remained with the main party.

The journey back was difficult, as until this point the sledges had been handled by four-man teams, and the reduction to three slowed them considerably. In an attempt to save several days, the party descended from the plateau by sledging several hundred feet down the deeply crevassed Shackleton Icefalls onto the Beardmore Glacier, rather than take the slower and safer climb down the mountainside. The three emerged battered but without major injury, despite having reached speeds that Evans estimated at close to sixty miles per hour. Once on the glacier, however, Evans began to suffer severe physical problems. He was initially afflicted with snow-blindness, making him unable to see clearly, and later began to develop the early signs of scurvy. These signs rapidly multiplied, leaving him weakened and constantly in severe pain, and within a couple of weeks he had deteriorated to the point that he was being pulled on the sledge by Lashly and Crean. Evans was the only one to develop scurvy to this degree, and a number of arguments have been put forward as to the reason. However, it seems likely that the root cause was that unlike the other explorers, Evans had apparently tried to avoid eating seal meat (in particular seal liver) during the winter, which he disliked but which was a rich source of Vitamin C. As his companion Frank Debenham put it many years later, "Teddy really was a very naughty boy and wouldn't eat his seal meat".

On 13 February, Evans attempted to order them to abandon him, but they refused, in what Evans later called "the first and last time my orders as a naval officer were disobeyed". They were finally forced to halt by a blizzard on 17 February, thirty-five miles from the base camp at Hut Point, when it became clear that the two men would no longer be able to pull the sledge. Lashly remained to look after Evans while Crean headed north; after walking for eighteen hours, he arrived at the hut where he met Atkinson with an assistant and a dog team. They headed south as soon as the weather cleared, finding Evans near to death, and carefully brought him back to the camp. He arrived there a few days before the Terra Nova returned, and he was returned to the ship to be nursed back to health. He remained bedridden until April, when he arrived in New Zealand.

After meeting Amundsen, recently returned from the Pole, and being reunited with his wife, Evans headed back to England, where he spent the northern summer of 1912 recuperating and raising funds for the Expedition. There, he met King George V, who promoted him to the rank of commander. Returning south later in the year, Evans commanded the Terra Nova on its relief journey; it arrived at McMurdo Sound on 18 January, the anniversary of Scott's arrival at the Pole, to be greeted by the news of the polar party's death. Recording his "overwhelming sorrow" at the news, Evans assumed formal command of the expedition in lieu of Scott, and organised the final departure of the expedition from the continent.

Evans' wife, Hilda, became ill with peritonitis on board the Oranto on 14 April 1913 whilst on her way to England with her husband after his return from Scott's second and fateful expedition. She was operated on by the ship's doctor on 15 April. Conscious when the ship reached Naples on the 17th she stayed on board but after setting back to sea, she died at midnight of 18 April. Hilda was buried in Toulon, France. A memorial to Hilda Evans is to be found in Linwood Cemetery, Bromley, Christchurch, New Zealand at Block 46 Plot 205 – the Russell family grave.

In 1921, Collins published Evans' first hand account of the Terra Nova Expedition under the title South With Scott. A century on, Evans' account has been re-examined in the light of a recovered cache of correspondence dealing with the expedition. Issues canvassed were: whether Evans took crucial supplies from food and fuel depots that had been had laid out in advance thus leaving Scott perilously short during his return journey, whether Evans impeded plans for a dog team rescue mission that Scott had planned should he be late in returning from the Pole, the obfuscation of when Evans fell down with scurvy, and the degree of personal animosity between Evans and Scott.

== First World War ==
Following his Antarctic service, Evans had a successful naval career, serving at the outbreak of the First World War in 1914 in the rank of commander.

On 20 April 1917, while on night patrol of the Dover Barrage near Goodwin Sands, he commanded the destroyer HMS Broke in an action against six German destroyers of the Kaiserliche Marine that had started to bombard Dover. Along with HMS Swift, Evans engaged the German destroyers in what became known as the Battle of Dover Strait. A torpedo from HMS Swift sank one of the enemy destroyers, G85. Then the Broke deliberately rammed another, G42, almost breaking it in two. The two ships became locked together and for a while there was close-quarters fighting on Broke's deck until the Broke managed to break free. The German destroyer sank while the remaining German warships escaped. The badly damaged Broke was towed home, while the similarly damaged Swift made her own way back. The action gained him immediate promotion to the rank of captain, award of the DSO, and made Evans a popular hero, feted in the British press as "Evans of the Broke". Evans wrote an account of his activities on the Dover Patrol in his book Keeping the Seas (1920).

Evans married Norwegian Elsa Andvord in 1916, by whom he had two children: Richard Evans, 2nd Baron Mountevans (born 1918), and Cdr the Hon Edward Evans (born 1924), both of whom left children.

== Inter-war service ==
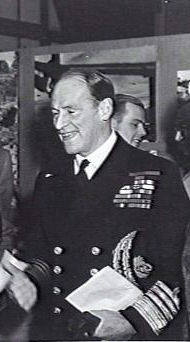
Admiral Sir Edward Evans in 1944

While in command of HMS Carlisle on the China Station, Evans rescued 200 survivors from the SS Hong Moh. His actions, including swimming to give direction on the sinking ship, earned him several awards for life-saving.

In February 1928 he was promoted to rear-admiral commanding the Royal Australian Navy Fleet (formally titled "Rear Admiral Commanding HM Australian Squadron"). In November 1932 he was made vice-admiral. He was commander-in-chief of the Africa Station and Deputy High Commissioner of the British Protectorates of Bechuanaland, Swaziland and Basutoland from 1933 to 1935. He served as Commander-in-Chief, The Nore, an operational command position of the Royal Navy based at Chatham in Kent, from 1935 to 1939 and was promoted to admiral in July 1936.

Evans was advanced to Knight Commander of the Order of the Bath (KCB) in 1935, and appointed a Knight of Grace of the Order of St John of Jerusalem in 1937.

== Second World War ==
Recalled in 1939, the following year Evans participated in the Norwegian campaign, after which he retired from the Royal Navy on 9 January 1941. During the remainder of the Second World War he served as London Regional Commissioner for Civil Defence. On 12 November 1945, he was created a Peer as Baron Mountevans, of Chelsea in the County of London. He was Rector of the University of Aberdeen from 1936 to 1942.

== Retirement ==
On 4 March 1947 Mountevans was on board a Norwegian vessel, MV Bolivar, when it broke in two and was wrecked on the Kish Bank 13 kilometers from Dalkey Island. He and 44 others on board were rescued by the Dún Laoghaire and Howth RNLI lifeboats.

In 1947 Evans chaired a committee to formalise the rules of professional wrestling in the UK. These rules became known as the Admiral-Lord Mountevans rules.

Evans died in Norway on 20 August 1957 and was succeeded by his son Richard Evans, 2nd Baron Mountevans. He was buried in the family plot at the Vår Frelsers gravlund cemetery in Oslo.

== Honours and awards ==
Coat of arms of Edward Evans, 1st Baron Mountevans
Crest Between two cross crosslets fitchee Sable a demi lion erased reguardant Or holding between the paws a boar's head also Sable. Escutcheon Argent two bars wavy Azure between three boars' heads Sable. Supporters On either side a king penguin Proper. Motto Libertas

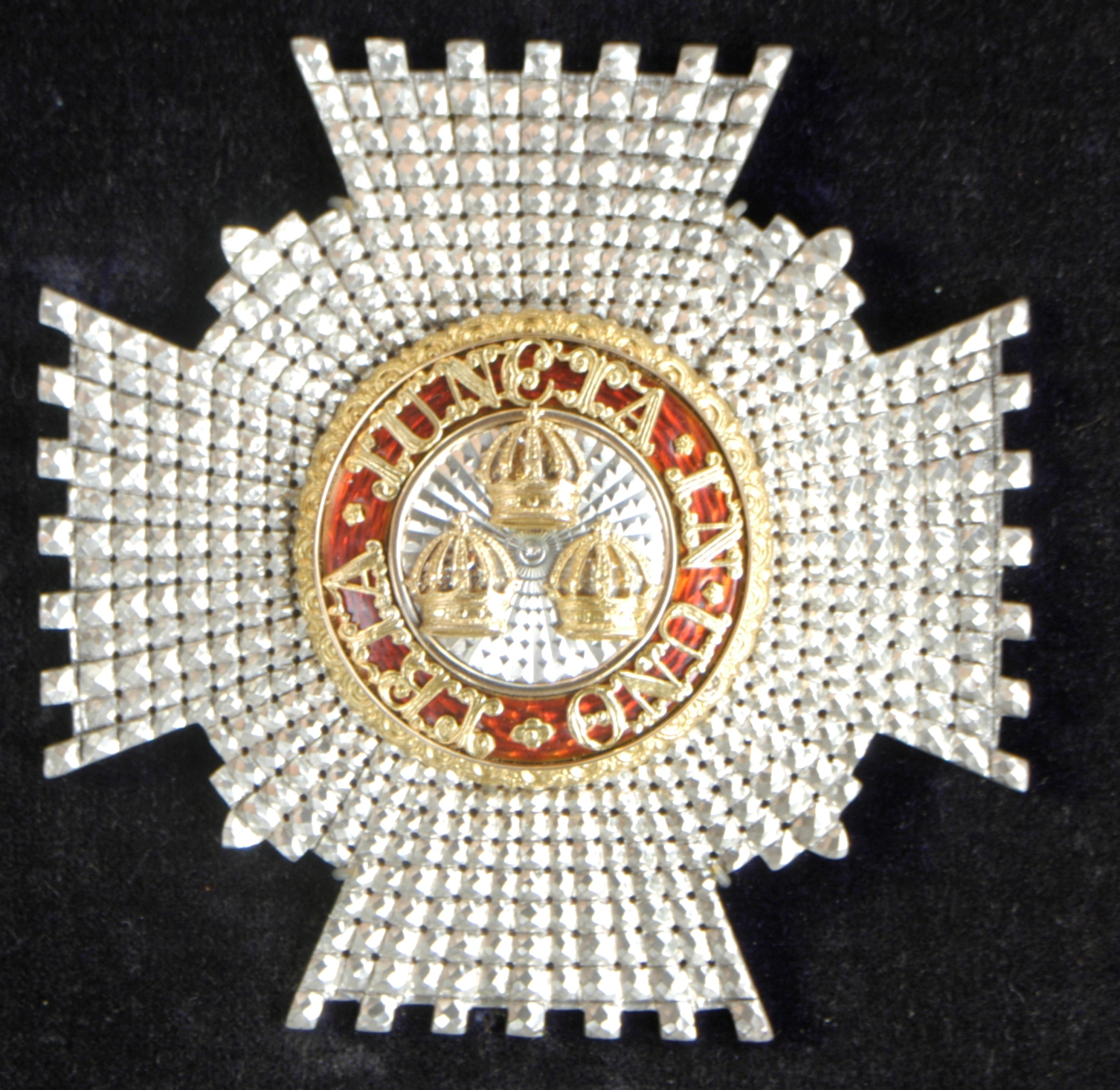
KCB breast star

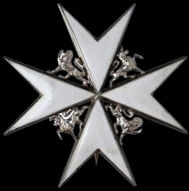
KStJ breast star

Edward Evans received numerous honours and decorations for his Antarctic efforts, military service and for life-saving (given with London Gazette entries, where available):

Companion of the Order of the Bath (LG 16 May 1913, p. 3507), (Knight Commander (1935))
Companion of the Distinguished Service Order (LG 10 May 1917, p. 4481)
Knight of Grace of the Order of St John of Jerusalem (20 December 1937)
Grande-Oficial of the Order of the Tower and Sword – Portugal (LG 17 Jan 1919, p. 887)
Commandeur of the Order of the Crown – Belgium (LG 8 Apr 1921, p. 2797)
Kommandør of the Royal Norwegian Order of St Olaf (1939)
Officier of the Legion of Honour – France (LG 20 Jul 1917, p. 7427)
Officier of the Order of Leopold – Belgium (LG 1 Jan 1917, p. 11)
Cavaliere of the Military Order of Savoy – Italy (1905)
Croix de Guerre – France (LG 22 Jun 1917, p. 6257)
Navy Cross – United States (LG 16 Sep 1919, p. 11583)
Médaille Civique – Belgium (LG 12 Dec 1919, p. 15432)
Antarctic Polar Medal (Silver) (LG 25 Jul 1913, p. 5322)
Sea Gallantry Medal (1921).

He was made a Freeman of several municipalities: Calgary, Alberta, Canada (1914); Dover (1938); Chatham (1939); Kingston upon Thames (1945); the City of London (1945); and Chelsea (1945).

Evans also received various awards: recognising the part he played at the Hong Moh disaster in the South China Sea: Médaille Civique of Belgium, 1st Class for saving life at sea (1919); Board of Trade Silver Medal for Saving Life at Sea (1921); Special Gold Medal from Lloyd's for saving life (1921);
for his part in expeditions: King Edward VII and King George V Medal
for Antarctic Exploration: Silver Polar Medal (24 July 1913); Gold Medallist of Royal Hungarian and Royal Belgian Geographical Societies; Livingstone Medallist; Gold Medals from the Cities of Paris and Rouen, and from the Geographical Societies of Marseille, Rouen, and Newcastle; honorary member of many Geographical Societies;
and, in academia: LLD, Aberdeen Univ, (1936).

== In popular culture ==
In the 1948 film Scott of the Antarctic, Evans was played by Kenneth More. In the 1985 Central Television serial, The Last Place on Earth, Evans was played by Michael Maloney, and his wife Hilda was played by Jane Laurie.

== Publications ==
Works about Antarctica

- Voyages of the 'Terra Nova' (1913)
- Rear-Admiral E. R. G. R. Evans C.B., D.S.O., R.N. (1921). South with Scott. Collins.
- British Polar Explorers (1944)
- The Desolate Antarctic (1950)
- The Antarctic Challenged (1955)
- Man of the White South: The story of Captain Scott (1958)

Other works

- Keeping the Seas (1920)
- Adventurous Life (1946)

Children's literature

- The Adventures of Peter. (1924)
- The Mystery of the 'Polar Star' (1927)
- The Treasure Trail (1927)
- To Sweep the Spanish Main! (1930)
- For The White Cockade (1931)
- The Exile (A Story for Boys) (1933)
- Spanish Death (1933)
- Troopers of the King (1933)
- The Ghostly Galleon (1933)
- Noel Howard, Midshipman (1935)
- Pirate's Doom (1930)
- Ghosts of the Scarlet Fleet (1932)
- The Mystery Chest

== See also ==
- History of Antarctica
- Cape Evans
- Comparison of the Amundsen and Scott Expeditions

== Sources ==
- Lord Mountevans (1946). Adventurous life. London: Hutchinson.
- Pound, Reginald (1963). Evans of the Broke: a biography of Admiral Lord Mountevans KCB, DSO, LLD. London: Oxford University Press.
- Thursfield, H. G. (2004). "Evans, Edward Ratcliffe Garth Russell, first Baron Mountevans (1880–1957)". Oxford Dictionary of National Biography (online ed.). Oxford University Press. doi:10.1093/ref:odnb/33036. (Subscription, Wikipedia Library access or UK public library membership required.)
- Woolven, Robin (2001). Civil Defence in London 1935–1945: the Formation and Implementation of the Policy for, and the Performance of, the Air Raid Precautions (later Civil Defence) Services in the London Region (PDF) (Thesis). King's College, London.
- Cherry-Garrard, Apsley: The Worst Journey in the World. ISBN 0-88184-478-0
- Evans, E. R. G. R. South With Scott Collins, London, 1921.
- Fiennes, Ranulph (2003). Captain Scott. Hodder & Stoughton Ltd. ISBN 0-340-82697-5.
- Huntford, Roland: The Last Place on Earth. ISBN 0-689-70701-0
- Preston, Diana: A First Rate Tragedy. ISBN 0-618-00201-4

Peerage of the United Kingdom
New creation	Baron Mountevans; 1945–1957	Succeeded by Richard Andvord Evans
Military offices
Preceded by George Hyde	Rear Admiral Commanding HM Australian Squadron; 1929–1931	Succeeded by Leonard Holbrook
Preceded by Sir Hugh Tweedie	Commander-in-Chief, Africa Station; 1933–1935	Succeeded by Sir Francis Tottenham
Preceded by Sir Hugh Tweedie	Commander-in-Chief, The Nore; 1935–1939	Succeeded by Sir Studholme Brownrigg
Academic offices
Preceded by Walter Elliot	Rector of the University of Aberdeen; 1936–1942	Succeeded by Stafford Cripps
