= Richard Andvord (born 1886) =

Norwegian military officer and diplomat (1886–1965)

Richard Andvord (6 March 1886 – 26 January 1965) was a Norwegian cavalry officer, diplomat and aide-de-camp for the Norwegian royal family.

== Early life and career ==
Andvord was educated in commerce in Leipzig and Oxford. In 1911 he was employed as a cavalry officer, and between 1916 and 1927 he served as Norwegian military attaché in Bern, Vienna, Helsinki and London. From 1927 to 1930 he was an aide-de-camp of King Haakon VII of Norway. He held the titles of cavalry captain (rittmester) from 1930, and from 1949 kammerherre.

== Later career ==
During the occupation of Norway by Nazi Germany, Andvord was arrested in December 1944 in Hamar for "hostile behaviour" towards Germans. He was imprisoned in Grini concentration camp from 18 December 1944 to the liberation of Norway. In 1945 he was hired as director of the Royal Stables, and stayed in this position until 1960. He was succeeded by Erik Blankenborg Prydz. Curiously, the head of the Royal Stables had no responsibility for horses or equipages, but the motor vehicles owned by the Norwegian royal family as well as all car driving in connection with events at the Royal Palace. Andvord also acted as driver for foreign dignitaries, guiding them on their way to royal audience. In 1958 the entire court of the Norwegian royal family consisted of as few as seven people; Richard Andvord, Ingvald Smith-Kielland, Odd Grønvold and Ellinor Grønvold, Else Werring, Ingeborg von Hanno and Vincent Bommen.

== Legacy and death ==
In 1959 Andvord was decorated as a Commander of the Royal Norwegian Order of St. Olav, and he also held four royal medals and several foreign orders of knighthood. He died in January 1965, 79 years old.
