= Hans Aimar Mow Grønvold =

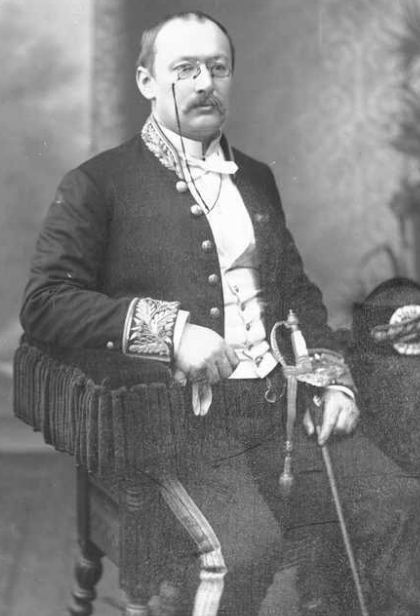
Hans Aimar Mow Grønvold.

Hans Aimar Mow Grønvold (26 June 1846 – 25 July 1926) was a Norwegian civil servant and music writer.

He was born in Søfde Municipality as a son of vicar Bernt Olaus Grønvold (1819–1900). He was a third cousin of painters Bernt and Marcus Grønvold and educator Didrik Grønvold, and a granduncle of Odd Grønvold.

He graduated with the cand.jur. degree, and from 1885 to 1906 he was a deputy under-secretary of state in the Ministry of Labour. In 1906 he was appointed as private secretary to King Haakon VII of Norway.

Grønvold was also a music critic in the newspapers Aftenbladet from 1867 to 1881 and Aftenposten from 1881 to 1886, and issued books in this field. He was also chair of the Hoved Line, from 1904. He died in 1926.
