= Marcus Grønvold =

Norwegian painter (1845–1929)

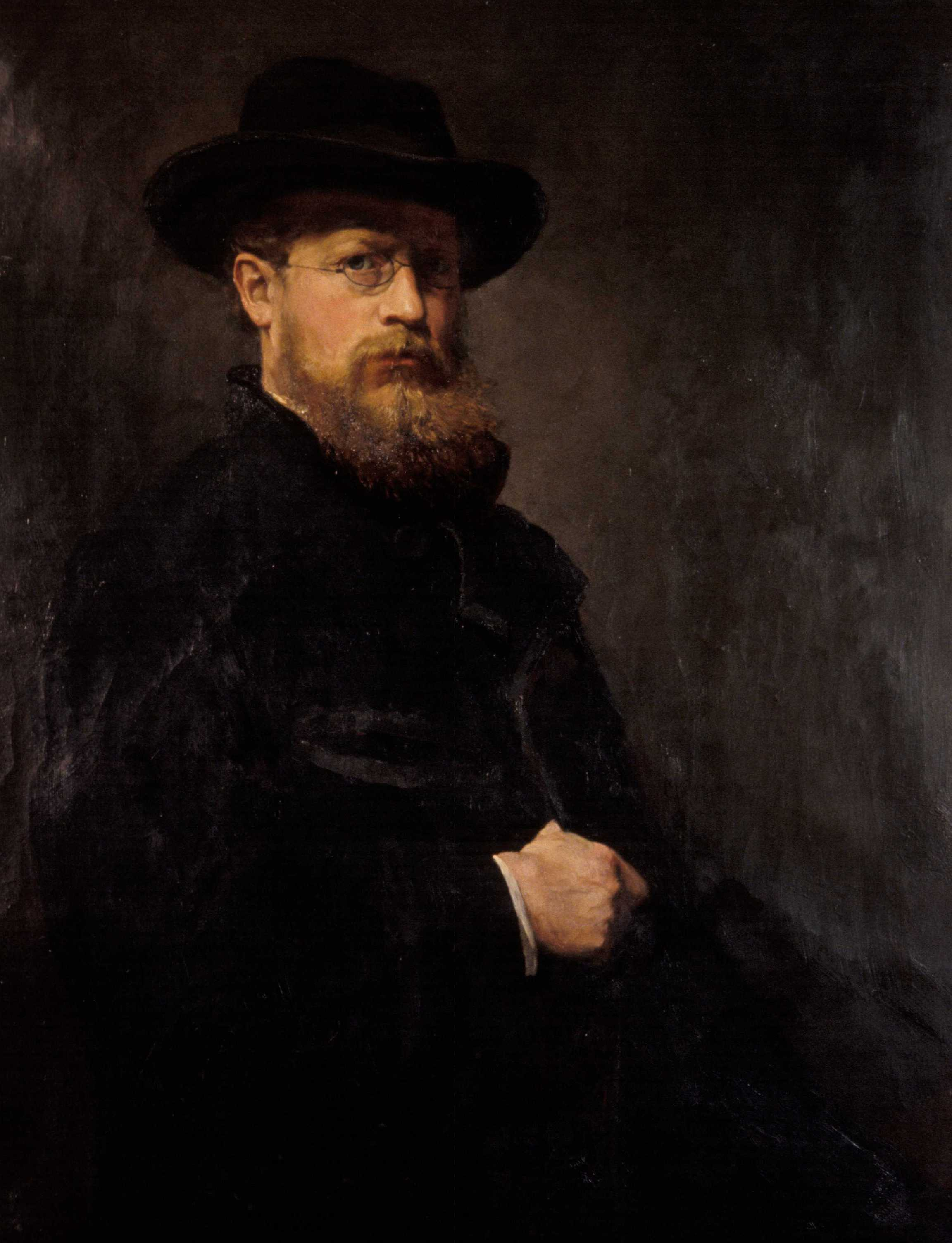
Marcus Grønvold self portrait (1878)

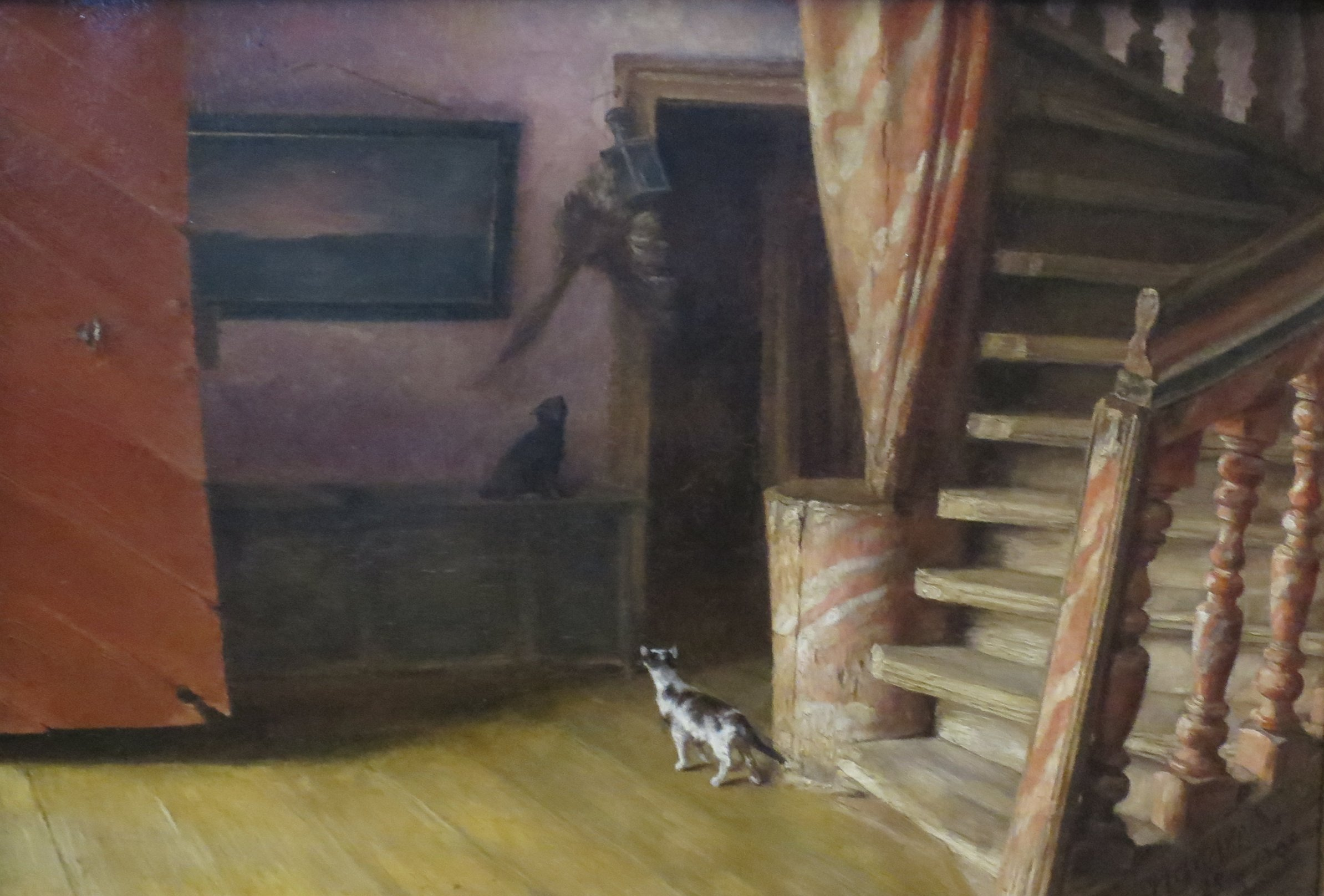
Staircase in the Rosendal Manor (1903)

Marcus Frederik Steen Grønvold (5 July 1845 – 10 October 1929) was a Norwegian painter. He painted genre scenes, historical and religious motifs and portraits as well as landscapes.

== Biography ==
Grønvold was born in Bergen, Norway. His father Christian August Grønvold (1810–1889) was vicar at St. Jørgens Hospital in Bergen. He was the brother of painter Bernt Grønvold (1859-1923) and educator Didrik Hegermann Grønvold (1855–1928). His third cousin Hans Aimar Mow Grønvold (1846–1926) was private secretary to King Haakon VII of Norway.

He studied at the Royal Danish Academy of Fine Arts in Copenhagen between 1866 and 1869 under August Schneider. In Munich he trained under Wilhelm von Diez from 1870 to 1871, Otto Seitz from 1871 to 1874 and under Karl Piloty between 1874 and 1877. After study trips to Norway, Switzerland, Italy and Paris, he settled at Munich in 1881. He published his memoirs Fra Ulrikken til Alperne in 1925. He has two works in the National Gallery of Norway. His art is on display at museums in Bergen, Cologne and Frankfurt.
