= C. Tybring-Gjedde =

Norwegian wholesale business

C. Tybring-Gjedde ASA was a Norwegian wholesaler which was founded in Oslo in 1918 and sold paper goods, office supplies, household goods and other items.

== History ==
C. Tybring-Gjedde ASA was founded by Carl Christopher Tybring-Gjedde (1897–1975). His son, Willi Harald Tybring-Gjedde (1930–2022), businessman, art collector and father of Fremskrittsparti politician Christian Tybring-Gjedde, later took over as leader. Harald Tybring-Gjedde then took over in 1990.

C. Tybring-Gjedde had its main office and branches in Oslo, but was later established across Norway. The firm also had an initial public offering. The company was involved in the printing industry for a while. The company printed business cards, at first for companies, but then also to private individuals, from 1969. Their "cash & carry" principle meant that customers picked their items through self-service direct from the wholesaler and paid directly. The stores had an age limit, so children under a certain age were not allowed to enter the stores.

The company expanded to Denmark and Sweden in the 1990s. In 2001, it was taken over by the supermarket chain Binders. In 2005, C. Tybring-Gjedde was joined with the family owned Rich. Andvord AS to make Andvord Tybring-Gjedde (ATG), and in 2006 it was taken over by the Dutch office supplies company Buhrmann, which was again taken over by the American Staples in 2008.
