= Rich. Andvord =

Norwegian company

Rich. Andvord AS
- Founded: 1865
- Fate: merged with C. Tybring-Gjedde, 2005
- Headquarters: Oslo, Norway

Rich. Andvord AS was a Norwegian company.

It was established in 1865 by Richard Andvord, who traded with pens, paper and other writing materials through an outlet near Stortorvet, Oslo. He soon expanded into a larger company, including book printing and bookbinding in the company portfolio.

In later times it acquired Grieg Kalenderforlag and Emo, among others. In 2005 it was merged with C. Tybring-Gjedde to form the new company Andvord Tybring-Gjedde.
