= Edson =

Edson may refer to:

== Places ==
=== Canada ===
- Edson, Alberta

=== United States ===
- Edson, Kansas, an unincorporated community
- Edson, South Dakota, a ghost town
- Edson, Wisconsin, a town
  - Edson (community), Wisconsin, an unincorporated community

== People ==
=== Given name ===
- Édson, a list of people with the Portuguese given name, often written as Edson
- Edson (footballer, born 1977), Brazilian footballer
- Edson (footballer, born 1987), Brazilian footballer
- Edson (footballer, born 1990), Brazilian footballer
- Edson (footballer, born 1991), Brazilian footballer
- Edson (footballer, born 1998), Brazilian footballer
- Edson Álvarez (born 1997), Mexican footballer
- Edson Arantes do Nascimento (1940–2022), Brazilian footballer, better known by his nickname Pelé
- Edson Braafheid (born 1983), Dutch footballer
- Edson Buddle (born 1981), American soccer player
- Edson Fachin, Brazilian jurist and lawyer
- Edson Minga (born 1979), Congolese footballer
- Edson B. Olds (1802–1869), American politician
- Edson Olf (born 1986), Dutch politician
- Edson A. Putnam (1832–1917), American politician
- Edson Stroll (1929–2011), American actor
- Edson Warner (1930–2019), Canadian sports shooter
- Edson White (1849–1928), American Seventh-day Adventist and publisher

=== Surname ===
- Allan Edson (1846–1888), Canadian painter
- Billy Edson (1874–1965), football player, lawyer, and politician in Iowa
- C. L. Edson (1881–1975), American newspaper columnist, humorist, and poet
- Calvin Edson, American soldier and sideshow performer
- Carroll A. Edson (1891–1986), early leader in the Boy Scouts of America; co-founder of the Order of the Arrow scouting honor society
- Charles Edson (1864–1936), American composer
- Evelyn Edson (born 1940), American medievalist and historian of cartography
- Fanny Carter Edson (1887–1952), American geologist
- Franklin Edson (1832–1904), 85th Mayor of New York
- Gary R. Edson, president of Conservation International
- Gus Edson (1901–1966), American cartoonist (originally "Edelstein")
- Hilary Edson (born 1965), American soap opera actress
- Hiram Edson (1806–1882), pioneer of the Seventh-day Adventist Church
- J. T. Edson (1928–2014), English author of American Westerns
- Jerrod Edson (born 1974), Canadian novelist
- Job A. Edson (1854–1928), president of the Kansas City Southern Railway
- John Joy Edson, American banker
- Katherine Philips Edson (1870–1933), American labor and women's rights activist
- Lewis Edson (1748–1820), early American composer
- Marcellus Gilmore Edson (1849–1940), Canadian pharmacist who was the first person to patent peanut butter
- Margaret Edson (born 1961), American playwright
- Merritt A. Edson (1897–1955), U.S. Marine Corps General
- Mike Edson (born 1942), British Church of England clergyman
- Norman Lowther Edson (1904–1970), New Zealander biochemist
- Rich Edson (born 1981), American journalist
- Richard Edson (born 1954), American actor
- Russell Edson (1935–2014), American poet, novelist, writer and illustrator
- Susan Ann Edson (1823–1897), American doctor and personal physician to James A. Garfield
- William Alden Edson (1912–2012), American scientist and engineer

== Other ==
- Edson Range, a rifle range at Camp Pendleton, near Oceanside, California
- USS Edson, a destroyer of the United States Navy
