= Édson =

Édson, often spelled Edson, is a name common in Portuguese.

The name is found as early as the 1920s, for example in the name of the businessman Edson Queiroz. The most famous holder of the name is the footballer Pelé, born Edson Arantes do Nascimento, although his name is given as Edison on his birth certificate. The name Édson alone has been taken as a mononym by many Brazilian footballers, but most notably Édson Boaro (1959) from the 1986 World Cup squad.

== People ==
People with the name include:

- Edson (footballer, born 1977), Brazilian footballer playing for Korona Kielce
- Édson (footballer, born 1984), Guinea-Bissauan footballer
- Édson (footballer, born 1985), Brazilian footballer
- Edson (footballer, born 1987), Brazilian footballer
- Edson (footballer, born 1990), Brazilian footballer
- Edson (footballer, born 1991), Brazilian footballer
- Edson (footballer, born 1998), Brazilian footballer
- Edson Arantes do Nascimento (1940–2022), Brazilian footballer known as Pelé
- Edson Araújo (born 1980), Brazilian footballer
- Edson Barboza (born 1986), Brazilian-American mixed martial artist
- Édson Bastos (born 1979), Brazilian footballer
- Edson Bindilatti (born 1979), Brazilian decathlete and bobsledder
- Édson Boaro (born 1959), Brazilian footballer
- Edson Cariús (born 1988), Brazilian footballer
- Édson Di (born 1979), Brazilian footballer
- Edson Gaúcho (born 1955), Brazilian footballer
- Édson Nobre (born 1980), Angolan footballer
- Edson Paraíba (born 1992), Brazilian footballer
- Edson Pinheiro (born 1979), Brazilian Paralympic athlete
- Edson Ratinho (born 1986), Brazilian footballer
- Édson Ribeiro (born 1972), Brazilian sprinter
- Edson Silva (footballer, born 1986), Brazilian footballer
- Edson Sitta, Brazilian footballer
- Edson Tavares, Brazilian football manager
