= Edeson =

Edeson is a surname. Notable people with the surname include:

- Arthur Edeson (1891–1870), American cinematographer
- Matt Edeson (born 1979), English footballer
- Robert Edeson (1868–1931), American actor and vaudeville performer

== See also ==
- Edson (disambiguation)
