= Allan Edson =

Canadian landscape painter (1846–1888)

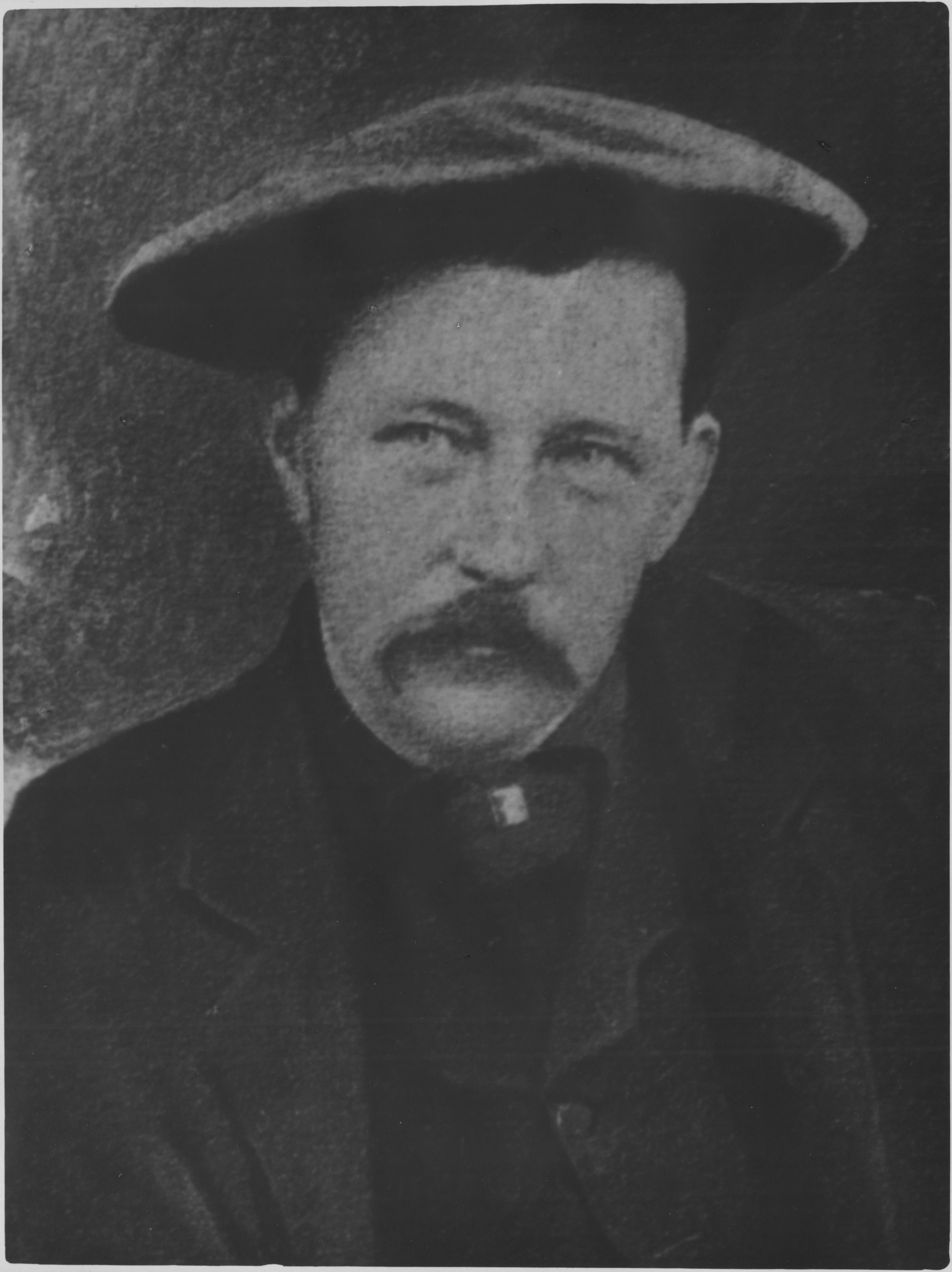
- Edson, undated
- Born: Allan Aaron Edson; December 18, 1846; Eastern Townships, Canada East
- Died: May 1, 1888 (aged 41); Sutton, Québec

Aaron Allan Edson RCA (1846–1888) was one of Canada's most prominent landscape artists in the 1870s.

== Biography ==
At nine, his family settled in Stanbridge, Quebec, where his father ran a hotel. Nearby was a bank owned by John Carpenter Baker, a patron of the arts who helped start the careers of Edson and another local painter, Wyatt Eaton, by helping to pay for art lessons and buying their works. In addition to his art studies, Edson received a standard commercial education.

In 1861, he moved to Montréal, where he worked as the bookkeeper for a frame maker and art dealer named Augustus Pell, who introduced him to local artists. Around 1863, he took lessons from Robert Scott Duncanson, an American painter who lived there during the Civil War. This was followed by two years in London, England, where he studied further. In London, he was influenced by the Pre-Raphaelite Brotherhood's propensity for detailed compositions. Upon his return, he became a founding members of the Society of Canadian Artists in 1867, the earliest Canadian professional body of artists, and participated in their first exhibition in 1868. He was also one of the original member of the Ontario Society of Artists, founded in 1872, and the Royal Canadian Academy of Arts, established in 1880 with Royal patronage. At one of their first exhibitions, some of his works were purchased by Princess Louise for herself and her mother, Queen Victoria.

He exhibited regularly throughout Canada. He also presented his works at the Royal Academy of Arts in London, the Paris Salon and two world's fairs: the Centennial Exposition in Philadelphia and the Exposition Universelle in Antwerp.

In the early 1880s, he went to live in France, spending most of his time in Cernay-la-Ville, where he studied with Léon Germain Pelouse. From 1886 to 1887, he was in London, then returned to Canada, settling in Sutton, Québec. The following year, he died of complications from pneumonia, which he caught while on an expedition to paint winter scenes.

== Selected paintings ==
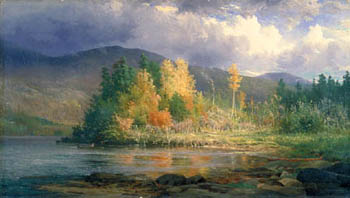
The Coming Storm at
Lake Memphremagog

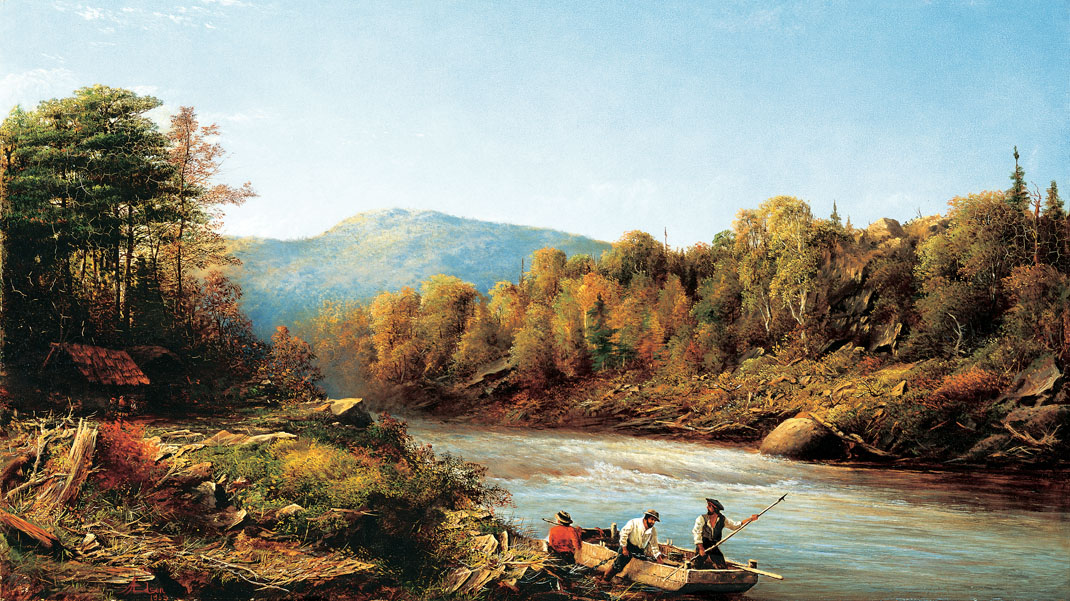
Lumberjacks on the
Saint-Maurice River

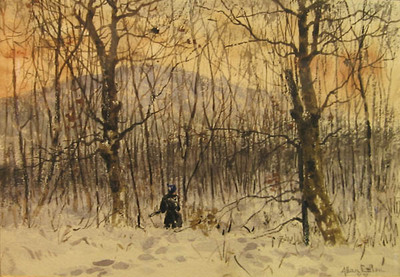
Québec Winter

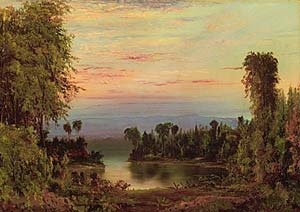
The Pike River
