= C. L. Edson =

American writer

- Born: Charles Leroy Edson; September 6, 1881 or December 6, 1881; Wilber, Nebraska, U.S.
- Died: December 4, 1975 (aged 93 or 94); Topeka, Kansas, U.S.
- Education: University of Kansas
- Occupations: Columnist; humorist; author; poet
- Spouse: Lena Fern Bear
- Writing career
- Period: 1900–1937

Charles Leroy Edson (September 6 or December 6, 1881 – December 4, 1975) was an American newspaper columnist, humorist, and poet whose work appeared in New York papers in the first decades of the 20th century. He wrote a guide to writing newspaper humor, The Gentle Art of Columning: A Treatise on Comic Journalism (1920), and an autobiography, The Great American Ass (1926). Edson also wrote for several national publications.

Edson's career suffered after he published his autobiography, which included an extensive personal attack on Franklin P. Adams, a New York colleague. In 1935 he joined the Federal Writers' Project in Topeka, Kansas and stayed there until 1937. Thereafter, little is known about the specifics of his life, though in 1963, he was reported to be living in relative obscurity and poverty in a Topeka hotel. After the building was demolished, he resided at a nursing home in the city until his death in 1975.

== Early life and education ==
Edson was born in Wilber, Nebraska, son of James Bassett and Emma Lillian (Thomas) Edson, and uncle of William Alden Edson. His birth date is variously listed as September 6 or December 6, 1881. His father was a descendant of John Alden, signatory of the Mayflower Compact. The Edson side of the family also dates to early colonial times, with Deacon Samuel Edson arriving in Salem, Massachusetts in 1639. Edson's father was a wealthy farmer and merchant, but imposed an austere lifestyle on his family. In 1918, Edson's mother successfully sued his father for half of his net worth.

Edson attended public schools in Cuba, Kansas, and enrolled at the University of Kansas in 1900. While there he started a literary magazine called The Automobile. He printed the magazine himself, illustrating it with woodcuts carved with a penknife. In 1901, Carl Sandburg, editor of a college literary magazine in Galesburg, Illinois, saw an issue of The Automobile. Sandburg's Lombard Review reprinted one of Edson's poems and, in a separate notice, praised Edson's work. Edson and Sandburg exchanged letters, sharing an enthusiasm for the ideas of Elbert Hubbard, the poetry of Walt Whitman, and socialism. They last corresponded in 1942.

== Career ==
=== Early newspaper work ===
In 1905, Edson married Lena Fern Bear. That same year, he began working for the Kansas City Star, first as a reporter but soon as a humor columnist. He worked for the Star for the next two years, then moved to the Arkansas Ozarks in 1907 with the intention of starting an artists' and writers' colony. Although at least ten people spent time there, most soon returned to the city. Edson left but regularly returned to his farm there over the next decade, observing the customs, attitudes, and speech patterns of his rural neighbors, which formed the basis for much of his later writing.

By 1908 the Edsons had returned to Kansas City where their only child, Helen Poe Edson was born. Edson moved to Tulsa, Oklahoma in the spring of 1910 to become the new associate editor of the Tulsa Post and their first resident light verse poet, publishing 10 to 15 poems a week. Years later, Edson claimed to have published 5,000 poems in his lifetime.

In 1911, Edson moved to Girard, Kansas to work for the socialist weekly Appeal to Reason. At this time, the publication was near the height of its popularity, with a national readership of 475,000. But just a few months after Edson joined the staff the paper went into a crisis due to its coverage of what turned out to be a false story. In the ensuing scandal, Appeal to Reason's circulation suffered and Edson was dismissed. He was soon rehired at the Kansas City Star, and was persuaded by his editor to write about his time at Appeal to Reason. Edson wrote the story, the Star was sued as a result, and he was fired.

=== New York columnist ===
Leaving his wife and daughter in Arkansas, Edson went to New York in 1912 where he began writing a humor column called “An Arkansas Man on Broadway” for the New York Evening Mail. Edson joined a staff that included columnist Franklin P. Adams, muckraking journalist Zoe Beckley, illustrator Rube Goldberg, sports writer Grantland Rice, and drama critic Brock Pemberton. For his column, Edson adopted the persona of an Ozark mountaineer commenting on Manhattan life from a country perspective. In 1914, after Adams left the paper, Edson was selected to take over his column, “Always in Good Humor.” Edson wrote the column for less than a year, giving it up to return to Arkansas.

In 1916 Edson returned to New York to write an art and culture column for the New York Morning Telegraph. He focused mostly on Greenwich Village, covering local and visiting artists and writers including Ray Stannard Baker, Albert Boni, Guido Bruno, Max Eastman, Elsa von Freytag-Loringhoven, Harry Kemp, Alfred Kreymborg, Amy Lowell, Neysa McMein, Alla Nazimova, and Mary Pickford. Edson was critical of the bohemians living in Greenwich Village, especially Guido Bruno, "the Barnum of Bohemia," who turned his Washington Square garret into a tourist attraction and was receiving financial backing from the wife and son of the owner of the Morning Telegraph. Edson was fired from the Morning Telegraph in July 1916 for insubordination.

=== Mooseheart ===
In 1917 Edson moved to Aurora, Illinois to work as editor of the monthly magazine for Mooseheart, a home for disadvantaged children recently opened by James J. Davis, the Director General of the Loyal Order of Moose. During this time Edson also ghostwrote Davis's autobiography, The Iron Puddler, which described Davis's experiences as a young Welsh immigrant worker in a Pennsylvania steel mill. The book was published in 1922, one year after Davis's appointment to serve as United States Secretary of Labor.

=== The Gentle Art of Columning ===
Edson moved back to New York in 1918 to begin the most successful period of his career. Over the next half-decade he published widely in national publications, wrote another column for the Evening Mail and published The Gentle Art of Columning: A Treatise on Comic Journalism (1920) with prefaces by Don Marquis, Franklin P. Adams, Christopher Morley, and George Horace Lorimer. Edson was invited to join the Lotos Club, one of the oldest literary clubs in the United States, fondly called the "Ace of Clubs" by early member Mark Twain. The Gentle Art of Columning sold well and was still being used as a textbook in journalism classes several decades later.

After the success of his first book, Edson moved to Charleston, South Carolina with the intention of giving up newspaper work to write serious literature. He worked on his autobiography, but also became associate editor for the Charleston News and Courier. He wrote a column for the paper and later simultaneously wrote a column for the Norfolk Virginian-Pilot. He also sold a feature called “Tongue Twisters” to the Adams Newspaper Syndicate and wrote the six-volume Edson Pocket Library.

=== The Great American Ass ===
In 1926, while still in Charleston, Edson published his autobiography. He wanted to call it The Autobiography of an Ass and release it under his own name, but Brentano's, his publisher, overruled him on both counts. The book was published as The Great American Ass by Anonymous, with the idea that curiosity about the identity of the author would stimulate sales. In a 1928 letter to Robert Marks, a Charleston friend, Edson vented his frustration at how the book had been handled. "It needs revision damn badly. For instance, Sam Ornitz edited the opening paragraph to say that “Wilber, Nebraska, is not to be found on any map, it is exotically discovered for you in the works of Willa Cather…” The facts are, Wilber is the county seat of Saline County, and I was actually born there, and Willa Cather actually lived there at the same time. Sam supposed, of course, that I was just romancing. And without investigating, he announced there was no such town as Wilber, Saline County, Nebraska. All the critics knew better...therefore they concluded I was a liar in denying the existence of the town, a fool in not knowing the town existed, and finally, a coward in writing anonymously—all of which was not my fault at all."

The Great American Ass was a critical failure, but despite Edson's complaint, better editing would not have disposed critics more kindly to the story he chose to tell. The book catalogs the pretentious and petty tendencies of the narrator's Puritan ancestors, focusing on his father as the main villain. Edson also ascribes these traits to his New York colleague Franklin P. Adams, exposing him as a Chicago native who adopted the tastes, dress, and accent of the Harvard elite only upon arrival in New York. Adams was a popular columnist at the time and one of the founders of the Algonquin Round Table.

Despite mostly negative reviews, The Great American Ass generated enough sales to reach the New York Tribune's nonfiction best seller list. Time described it as the “freakish self-history” of a man "with passionate grievances, Tom o' Bedlam's honesty and a spilling store of acrid Americana to relate… The father looms as a monument of malicious, brooding egotism…" On the other hand, O. O. McIntyre called it “…as honest a book as ever written,” and Harold Trump Mason, owner of the avant-garde Centaur Press, sent a copy to D. H. Lawrence.

== Later years and death ==
Edson left Charleston for New York in 1927 in an attempt to revive his career, but his recent publishing failure and long absence from the city undermined his efforts. Times were changing as well, and his style of writing was losing its appeal. He earned some money by ghostwriting the story of prize fighter Abe the Newsboy.The Life Story of Abe the Newsboy was published in 1930 and still in print in 1960, but Edson received no royalties. By the end of his final stay in New York, Edson was destitute. Robert Marks reported to a mutual acquaintance: “I feel sorry as hell for old Edson. I've seen him fairly often, and while I like him a lot I think he's pretty hopeless. He is neither fish, flesh, fowl, nor good red herring. He has made enemies of everyone, has no practical sense, and little social poise.”

In 1930 Edson moved to Olathe, Kansas in search of work. He lived with relatives, occasionally selling a story or a poem. In 1935 he moved to Topeka, Kansas and joined the Federal Writers' Project. He worked on the Topeka City Guide and the Kansas volume of The American Guide, but regularly clashed with his supervisors, and in 1937 he was dismissed.

In 1963, a reporter for the Kansas City Star found Edson living on a government relief check in a Topeka railroader's hotel slated for demolition. The reporter wrote a feature on Edson, presenting him as a once-famous columnist now facing eviction and an uncertain future. The Star story was syndicated nationally by the Associated Press, putting Edson briefly in the national spotlight. Twelve years later, Edson died at a nursing home in Topeka on December 4, 1975. Depending on varying reports of his birth date, he died either at the age of 93 or 94.

== Selected works ==
- 1908: “Ballad of Kansas City,” updated by the author and reprinted by the Kansas City Star in 1946 as “Kansas City Saga.”
- 1908-09: “An Experiment in Living,” an eight-part series published in the Kansas City Star, based on Edson's experiences in the Arkansas Ozarks.
- 1914: Sunflowers,: A Book of Kansas Poems, edited by Willard Wattles. Edson was the major contributor (with 17 poems) in a collection including works by Vachel Lindsay, John Greenleaf Whittier, William Allen White, Eugene Fitch Ware, and Harry Kemp.
- 1916: “Comings and Goings In and About Manhattan,” a New York Telegraph column covering art and culture.
- 1920: The Gentle Art of Columning: A Treatise on Comic Journalism. Brentano's, New York.
- 1922: The Iron Puddler, ghostwritten autobiography of Secretary of Labor James J. Davis.
- 1924: The Edson Pocket Library, a set of six short (32-48 pages) books. Three are long poems, two are political fables, and one is a collection of light verse.
- 1926: The Great American Ass: An autobiography, by Anonymous. Brentano's, New York.
