= Edson, South Dakota =

Coordinates: 45°01′17″N 102°11′15″W

Edson is a ghost town in Meade County, in the U.S. state of South Dakota.

== History ==
Edson was laid out in 1909 by R. P. Edson, and named for him. A post office called Edson was established in 1910, and remained in operation until 1949.
