= William Alden Edson =

American engineering academic (1912–2012)

- Born: October 30, 1912
- Died: April 13, 2012 (aged 99)
- Education: University of Kansas; Harvard University
- Employer(s): Bell Laboratories; Illinois Institute of Technology; Georgia Institute of Technology; American Electronic Laboratories; SRI International
- Awards: IEEE Fellow

William Alden Edson (October 30, 1912 – April 13, 2012) was a scientist and engineer specializing in vacuum tube oscillators, radar, antennas and microwave technologies. His work spans universities, research institutions and commercial ventures. He taught at Illinois Institute of Technology, Georgia Institute of Technology and Stanford University.

He was a researcher at Bell Laboratories and later at the Stanford Research Institute (now SRI International). He also worked at General Electric and EMTECH, a company that he helped to found. His books, articles and patents have advanced technology in computers, radar detection and communications, for both civilian and defense applications. His works have been widely cited in scientific literature.

== Early life and education ==
Edson was born in Burchard, Nebraska to an educated farming family. Most of his childhood was spent in Olathe, Kansas, where his father, William Henry Edson, owned a modest farm. C. L. Edson was his uncle. His mother, Pearl (Montgomery) Edson was the librarian at the Carnegie library in Olathe. He had two siblings, married Saralou Peterson, and had three daughters. He was known as 'Bill' to friends and colleagues.

Edson attended the University of Kansas, where his father had also studied. There he earned his B.S. and M.S. degrees in Electrical Engineering in 1934 and 1935 respectively. He then entered Harvard University as a Gordon McKay scholar. The Gordon McKay endowment to Harvard was established upon the death of the entrepreneur in 1893, and was intended "to promote applied science..." by "aiding meritorious and needy students in pursuing those subjects..." Edson was a member of Tau Beta Pi and Sigma Tau and an associate member of Sigma Xi. Edson received his D.Sc. in Electrical Engineering from Harvard University in 1937, at the age of 25.

== Career ==
After earning his doctorate, he joined Bell Laboratories in the Murray Hill district of New York City as a member of the technical staff. Edson resigned that position to become an assistant professor at the Illinois Institute of Technology in 1941. In 1943 he returned to Bell Labs, recruited by Fred Terman, to become a staff member at its Radio Research Lab (RRL), a critical part of the U.S. government's counter-communications effort during World War II.

From about 1947 until 1952, Edson was a professor of Electrical Engineering at the Georgia Institute of Technology. In July 1952, he was named the Director of the School of Electrical Engineering, and also worked on sponsored research via the Georgia Tech Research Institute.

Interested in moving to California, Edson approached Fred Terman at Stanford University in Palo Alto, California, the area now widely known as Silicon Valley. Edson joined the faculty as Acting Professor, Electrical Engineering and was on the staff of Stanford Electronics Research Laboratory (ERL). In 1956, Edson was working for General Electric in Palo Alto, CA. Among other work, there he co-authored a proposal called ERMA (Electronic Recording Machine, Accounting), which proposed the commercialization of a research project, starting with installation for Bank of America, but intended to be sold to other banking entities.

In the early 1960s, he co-founded Electromagnetic Technologies Co. (EMTECH), which did much of its business with the U.S. Department of Defense. EMTECH was later acquired by American Electronic Laboratories (AEL), a Pennsylvania company. Edson, president of EMTECH at the time of the acquisition, left AEL to remain in the Silicon Valley area. In 1964, he was invited to speak at the Goddard Electronics Colloquia Series in Greenbelt, Maryland. On November 25, his topic was "The Design of Oscillators and Concept of Frequency Stability". The Colloquia series was designed for "keeping our electrical engineers abreast of the latest developments in their field by exposing them to recognized leaders in the electronics profession from throughout the country."

Edson joined the staff of the Stanford Research Institute (SRI) in Menlo Park, in 1971. He worked there until his retirement in 1986, and part-time until April 2006.

== Awards and memberships ==
In 1957, Edson was named a Life Fellow by the IEEE for "contributions in the fields of education and microwave electronics". He has been awarded over 20 patents by the U.S Patent Office.

In addition to his decades-long participation in IEEE, Edson was a longtime member of the Institute of Radio Engineers (IRE) and an active participant in the Western Electronics Show and Convention (WESCON), American Physical Society, American Association for Advancement of Science, American Society for Engineering Education, and the National Society for Professional Engineers.
