= Edson (footballer, born 1990) =

Brazilian footballer

Personal information
- Full name: Edson dos Santos Reis
- Date of birth: February 26, 1990 (age 36)
- Place of birth: Conceição do Jacuípe, Brazil
- Height: 1.83 m (6 ft 0 in)
- Position: Striker

Team information
- Current team: Ceilândia

Youth career
- 2002–2014: Vitória

Senior career*
Years	Team	Apps	(Gls)
2008–2015	Vitória	11	(10)
2008	→ Consadole Sapporo (loan)	0	(0)
2012	→ Botafogo-SP (loan)	6	(7)
2012	→ CRB (loan)	15	(3)
2013	→ Ituano (loan)	4	(0)
2013	→ Fortaleza (loan)	6	(2)
2014	→ Comercial (loan)	7	(1)
2014	→ Salgueiro (loan)		
2015	Caxias do Sul	7	(3)
2015–2017	Veranópolis	9	(0)
2017	Mogi Mirim	7	(4)
2017–2018	Novo Hamburgo	4	(0)
2018–2019	Suwaiq Club		
2019	Rio Claro	5	(0)
2020–2021	SC São Paulo		
2021	Linense	2	(0)
2021–2022	Bahia de Feira	6	(0)
2022–2023	Pacajus	48	(14)
2022	→ Fluminense EC (loan)	2	(0)
2023–2024	Tupy de Jussara		
2024–	Ceilândia	0	(0)
- * Club domestic league appearances and goals as of 21:54, 12 March 2024

Edson dos Santos Reis, or simply Edson (born February 26, 1990), is a Brazilian striker. He currently plays for Ceilândia.
