= Cernay-la-Ville =

- Commune
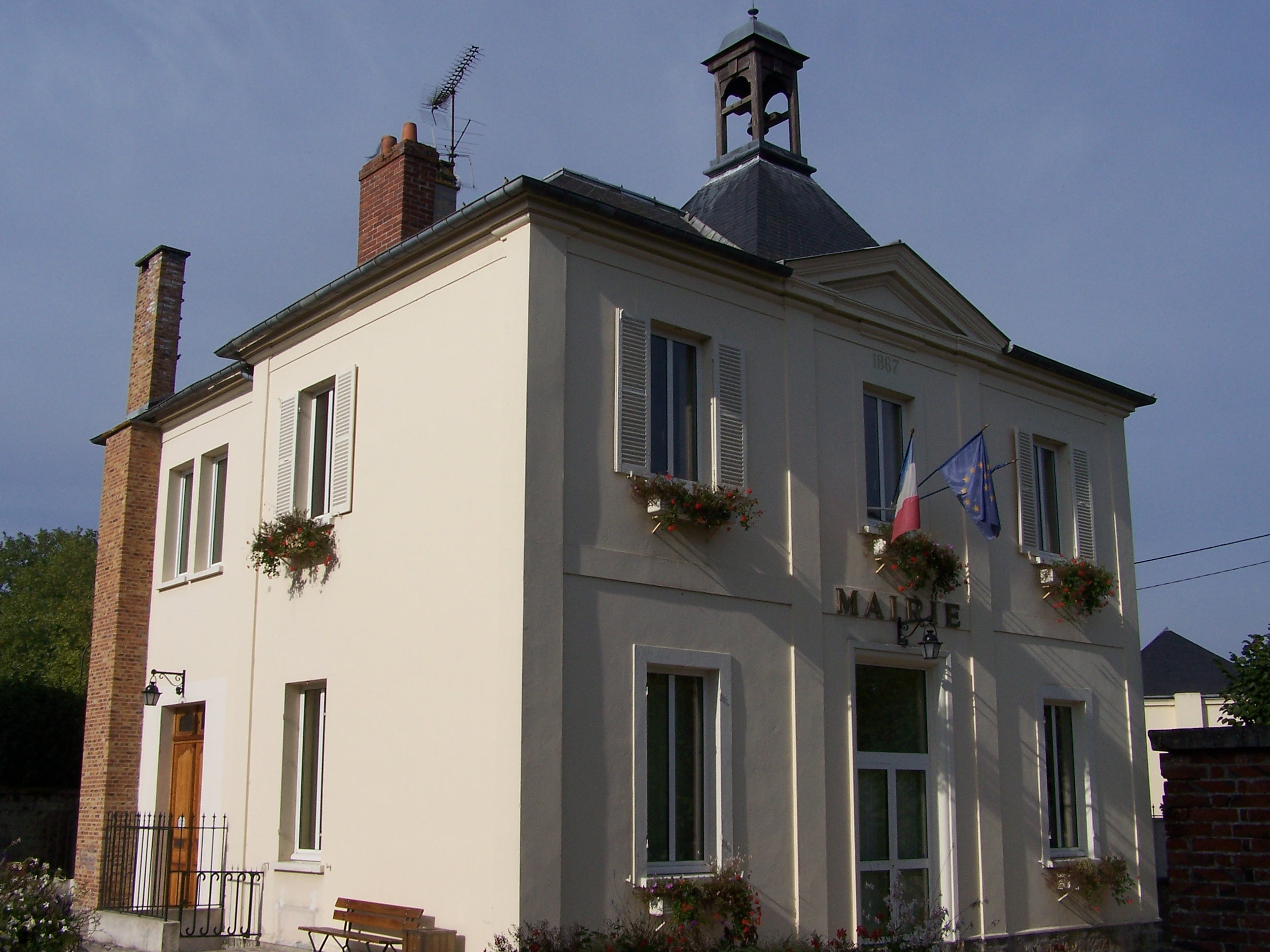
- Town hall
- Location of Cernay-la-Ville
- Location within France Location within Île-de-France (region)
- Coordinates: 48°40′27″N 1°58′32″E
- Country: France
- Region: Île-de-France
- Department: Yvelines
- Arrondissement: Rambouillet
- Canton: Rambouillet
- Intercommunality: CA Rambouillet Territoires

Government
  - Mayor (2020–2026): Claire Cheret
- Area^{1}: 9.77 km^{2} (3.77 sq mi)
- Elevation: 170 m (560 ft)
- Highest elevation: 178 m (584 ft)
- Lowest elevation: 111 m (364 ft)
- Population (2023): 1,516
  - Density: 155/km^{2} (402/sq mi)
- Demonym: Cernaysiens
- Time zone: UTC+01:00 (CET)
  - Summer (DST): UTC+02:00 (CEST)
- INSEE/Postal code: 78128 /78720
- ^{1} French Land Register data, which excludes lakes, ponds, glaciers > 1 km^{2} (0.386 sq mi or 247 acres) and river estuaries.

Cernay-la-Ville (French pronunciation: [sɛʁnɛ la vil]; lit. 'Cernay-the-City') is a rural commune in the Yvelines department in the Île-de-France region in north-central France.

== Geography ==
=== Location ===
Cernay-la-Ville is located between Rambouillet and Chevreuse, and inside of Haute Vallée de Chevreuse Regional Natural Park

== See also ==
- Vaux-de-Cernay Abbey
- Communes of the Yvelines department
