= Edson (footballer, born 1987) =

Brazilian footballer

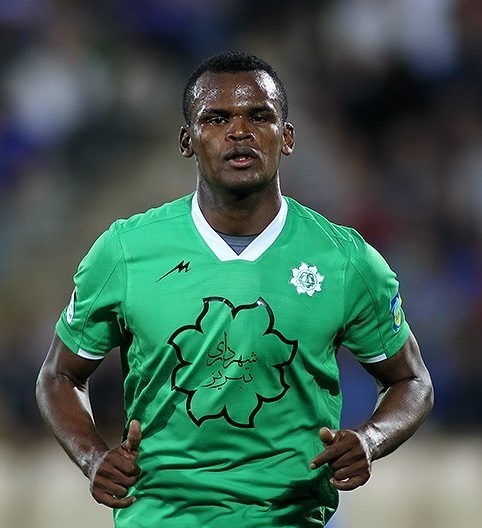
- Edson playing for Machine Sazi

Personal information
- Full name: Edson Henrique da Silva
- Date of birth: 6 July 1987 (age 39)
- Place of birth: Itaquitinga-PE, Brazil
- Height: 1.84 m (6 ft 0 in)
- Position: Centre-back

Youth career
- 2003–2004: Caxias

Senior career*
Years	Team	Apps	(Gls)
2005–2012	Figueirense	65	(0)
2007–2008	→ Belenenses (loan)	2	(0)
2008	→ Académica (loan)	5	(0)
2009	→ Rio Ave (loan)	12	(2)
2010	→ Botafogo (loan)	5	(0)
2011–2012	→ União de Leiria (loan)	20	(0)
2013–2016	Slaven Belupo	65	(3)
2016–2017	Machine Sazi	28	(0)
2017–2018	Gostaresh Foolad	23	(0)
2019	CRB	19	(0)
2020	América-RN	2	(0)

International career
2007	Brazil U20	2	(0)
- * Club domestic league appearances and goals as of 20:00, 18 March 2021 (UTC)

Edson Henrique da Silva or simply Edson (born 6 July 1987) is a Brazilian professional footballer who played as a centre-back.

== Career ==
Born in Itaquitinga-PE, Edson debuted as a senior by playing with Figueirense in the 2005 Campeonato Brasileiro Série A. He played with Figueirense until 2012. After playing with them in the Serie A until 2007, he moved on loan to Portugal to play with Belenenses in the second half of the 2007–08 Primeira Liga season. He stayed in Portugal for the next season, playing on loan with Primeira Liga sides Académica de Coimbra and Rio Ave. In summer 2009, he returned to Figueirense and played until the end of the year with them in the 2009 Campeonato Brasileiro Série B. In 2010, he was loaned to Serie A side Botafogo. In summer 2011, he was loaned again to a Portuguese club, this time to U.D. Leiria and played with them in the 2011–12 Primeira Liga. In summer 2012, he returned to Brazil and played with Figueirense in the 2012 Campeonato Brasileiro Série A. At the end of the year, he was released by Figueirense, and in summer 2013 he signed with Croatian Prva HNL side NK Slaven Belupo.

Edson joined CRB for the 2019 season.

== Honours ==
Figueirense

- Campeonato Catarinense: 2006

Botafogo

- Campeonato Carioca: 2010
