= Forenede Papirfabrikker =

Norwegian paper company

- Formerly: Union Drammen
- Company type: Aksjeselskap
- Industry: Pulp and paper
- Founded: 1907
- Defunct: 1986
- Headquarters: Drammen, Buskerud, Norway
- Products: Greaseproof paper, toilet paper, household paper

Forenede Papirfabrikker was an industrial company in Drammen that produced food paper, toilet paper, and household paper. The company was established in 1907. The factory was put into operation in 1908 and closed in 1986. Today the factory site holds part of the campus of the University of South-Eastern Norway and the Union Scene cultural center in the new Papirbredden district.

== History ==
The factory was built by the same founders as Star Paper Mill, the engineer Emil Ryberg and the manager Haakon Kierulf, and was located in the Grønland area on Strømsø in Drammen, close to Norwegian Paper Mill. Paper production at Forenede Papirfabrikker began on a Fourdrinier machine 120 inches wide, and in 1911 capacity was expanded with a second machine of similar design and width. The plant was driven by electric power and some steam power.

Unlike Gaasvad Papirfabrikk, Forenede Papirfabrikker did not undergo many dramatic changes of ownership. The factory did, however, burn down completely in 1912, with the damage assessed at one million kroner. When the rebuilding was finished in 1913, Union held a 60 percent ownership stake. A third paper machine was added in 1916, and in time the company was run directly from Union's office in Christiania, though Haakon Kierulf continued as the factory's commercial head. Its identity as a plant in the Union group strengthened over the years, and to people in Drammen today the former factory area is known as "Union," where a wide range of cultural activity has since been carried out.

The workforce in the interwar period was around 150 men and 30 women. Capacity had reached 8,500 tonnes of greaseproof a year by 1918, and was around 11,000 tonnes in 1970.

== Production ==
There was never any major change in production. In the last years of operation, production took place on only two of the paper machines, and the main product was toilet and household paper. In 1985 the neighboring company Sunland-Eker expanded its production of such paper with a new machine costing 60 million kroner, which directly threatened the position of Forenede Papirfabrikker in this market. Union began negotiations with Sunland-Eker for it to take over half the production, and with it responsibility for nearly half of the factory's 177 employees. When Union Drammen, which also included Drammen Paper Mills, was closed in 1986, only two producers of tissue paper remained in Norway, Sunland-Eker and Skjærdalens Brug. Whereas the Norwegian industry had previously held most of this market, Swedish and Finnish companies now had over 60 percent.

== Trade union ==
The trade union was branch 21, Forenede Papirfabrikk. It existed before 1916 but started again in 1920. In 1977 the union was merged with branch 12, the Drammen Paper Mills union, to form a new branch no. 35, Union-Drammen.

== Bibliography ==
- Shandy, Fritz H. (1989). «Gaasevadfabrikken. A/S Kierulf & Ryberg», in Strømsø bydelshistorie, vol. III, Fra Strømsø torg til Nøsteodden.
