= Jakob Falkenberg =

Norwegian businessman

Tage Jakob Falkenberg (9 October 1903 – 11 January 1989) was a Norwegian businessman.

== Early life and career ==
He was born in Kristiania as a son of military officer Jens Christian Balthazar Falkenberg (1875–1963) and Swedish wife Kersi Ulrica Petronella Augusta Göransson (1879–1958). He finished his secondary education in 1920 before graduating from the Norwegian Institute of Technology with the siv.ing. degree in chemical engineering in 1924.

He worked for short periods in Skien and Finland, then Riordon Pulp and Paper Company (bought by Canadian International Paper Company) from 1926 and Embretsfos Fabrikker back in Norway from 1929. He also married Vera Høyer in 1929.

== Career ==
In 1933 he was hired in Bøhnsdalen Mills, becoming chief engineer in 1935 and sous chef and managing director of Mathiesen Eidsvold Værk in 1941. During this period he was also a member of Eidsvoll municipal council from 1946 to 1953. From 1953 to 1973 Falkenberg was the chief executive officer of Tofte Cellulosefabrikk.

He chaired the Norwegian Cellulose Association for three non-consecutive periods, chaired the Norwegian Wood Processing Council for two non-consecutive periods, was a board member of Norges Industriforbund for two periods, and chaired a forestry research council from 1959 to 1964. He was also a supervisory council member of Andresens Bank. As he stepped down as chief executive of Tofte Cellulosefabrikk he remained on the board of directors.

Falkenberg was decorated with the King's Medal of Merit in gold, the Order of the White Rose of Finland and the Swedish Order of the Polar Star. He died in January 1989, aged 85.
