= Nordsjö =

Nordsjö may refer to:

- Kjellaug Nordsjö (1926–2021), a Swedish-Norwegian artist
- The North Sea, referred to as Nordsjön in Swedish
- Vuosaari (Nordsjö), a district of Helsinki, Finland
