= Vittingfos Tresliperi og Papirfabrikk =

Norwegian pulp and paper company

- Formerly: Vittingfos Træsliberi; A/S Vittingfoss; AS Nye Vittingfoss
- Type: Aksjeselskap
- Industry: Pulp and paper
- Founded: 1872
- Defunct: 1980
- Fate: Bankruptcy
- Headquarters: Hvittingfoss, Sandsvær, Buskerud, Norway
- Products: Wood pulp, paper

Vittingfos Tresliperi og Papirfabrikk was a wood-processing company in Sandsvær in Buskerud. The company was founded in 1872 and closed in 1980.

== History ==
Anders Olai Haneborg (1836–1920) was the main investor in the company that built Vittingfos Træsliberi in Sandsvær in 1872. He came from a family that had grown from a farm in Aurskog in Akershus into a major owner of land and forest, sawing timber from some of its forests into lumber at its own sawmills. Haneborg became a substantial landowner himself and also set up as a sawmill owner at Lillestrøm with a timber trade in Christiania.

Keenly interested in the new possibilities of wood pulp production in the 1870s, Haneborg invested, a few years after starting the mill at Hvittingfoss, in wood pulp production at Funnefossen in Nes on Romerike in 1874 and in the Varåa in Fet in Akershus in 1878.

=== The factory and the railway ===
Vittingfos Træsliberi was built at the Hvittingen waterfall, which dropped 20 meters across several channels. Fitted with two turbines and four grinding machines, the factory could produce 1,800 tonnes of wood pulp a year with its original machinery. The pulp was at first dried by pressing, but the mill acquired board machines as early as 1876. A third turbine and new grinding equipment in the mid-1880s raised output to 5,000 tonnes a year and required the workforce to grow from 26 in 1885 to 37 in 1887. Most of the timber came from forest owners in Numedal, but Haneborg also secured 10,000 mål of forest by Lake Hajeren, and to bring that timber down to the factory he invested in 1880–1881 in eight kilometers of timber chutes in the Hajer watercourse.

Moving wood pulp from Hvittingfoss to the Vestfold coast, where it could go on to market by rail or ship, was costly and laborious, as it had to be hauled on horse-drawn carts. Haneborg put a self-propelled steam engine with a couple of trailer wagons into this work in 1874, but it proved neither efficient nor cheaper. In the 1890s he sought to have a railway, the "Lågendal Line," built from Larvik to Hvittingfoss. It was built, though it ran to Holmestrand rather than Larvik, and the Hvittingfoss–Holmestrand line opened in 1902. This private railway, with Vittingfos Træsliberi as a significant shareholder and its dominant freight customer, must have raised the mill's market value sharply — welcome for Haneborg, who had been hard hit by the Christiania crash of 1899. The same year the line connected to the Vestfold Line and the coast, Vittingfos Træsliberi was sold to the large English paper and newspaper group Edward Lloyd Ltd., headquartered in London.

=== Paper production and electricity ===
With wood pulp prices low in the early 1900s, Edward Lloyd Ltd. also took up paper production at Hvittingfoss. The factory received a German-made paper machine driven by electricity from a power plant at Nord-fossen, and the mill at Sør-fossen was modernized at the same time. The machine produced thin printing paper for export to the East. By 1907 pulp prices had recovered enough for the owners to risk building a new mill at Nordfossen, choosing hot-grinding machines for their greater capacity over the old cold-grinding ones. A third mill followed in 1912 in the former cleaning building, and the factory also gained a sawmill and planing mill, built mainly to turn the best grinding logs into sawn timber, with the slabs going to the mill and the chips to the paper factory.

The wood-processing business grew strongly, and the Hvittingfoss line opened up timber buying in the districts along its route and the use of imported Russian billets. After the early-1900s expansions, the works produced 25,000 tonnes of wood pulp and about 3,000 tonnes of thin paper a year. The growth reshaped the local community as well: the workforce rose to about 250, most of whom settled near the factory, so that Hvittingfoss grew into a small town.

During the First World War the English owner withdrew and sold the company to a joint-stock company called A/S Vittingfoss. Keen on the energy of the waterfalls, this company quickly set about building a larger power station, and as early as 1917 the waterfall rights and facilities were sold to the town of Tønsberg in Vestfold, whose council members were eager to secure their community a reliable supply of modern hydroelectric power.

The waterfalls in Sandsvær were attractive power sources. When it sold the rights and facilities, Edward Lloyd Ltd. reserved the right to lease the mill, paper factory, and sawmill for further production over the next 14 years, and the lease ran until 1932. After the crash that struck the wood-processing industry in 1921, however, pulp and paper production at Hvittingfoss never settled into stable operation: the factory ran when orders and cheap power were available, while much of the workforce went idle for large parts of the year.

=== Crisis and expansion ===
When Edward Lloyd Ltd. gave up wood processing at A/S Vittingfos in 1932, it was hard to find new parties willing to take over a company that had seen no investment in maintenance or new equipment for two decades. On the initiative of Sandsvær municipality, a transitional arrangement was set up in which Ytre Sandsvær Skogeierforening and the Bruksarbeiderforeningen ran operations together, supplying wood pulp to Svelvik Papirfabrik to raise capital, with the mill master and the cashier acting as daily managers.

In this period, negotiations began with the manager Hans Olaf Nilsen (1873–1951) of Drammen, who had held leadership positions at Åmotsfors Pappersfabrik and Granfos Brug and had helped establish the Eker (1905) and Sunland (1912) paper factories. In 1933 he and a couple of other investors, together with Ytre Sandsvær Skogeierforening and Ytre Sandsvær municipality, formed a new company, Vittingfoss Bruk A/S, which leased the factory.

In 1936 the facilities were sold to a Tønsberg-dominated company that aimed to modernize for fine-paper production on a single paper machine. In 1947 A/S Vittingfoss Bruk bought a Yankee machine with a 92-inch working width from A/S Bamble Bruk; the hollander section was expanded the next year, and in 1952 the premises were enlarged and the company's largest paper machine rebuilt, with the aim of raising production by 30 to 40 percent. Until the 1950s Vittingfoss produced both wood-containing and wood-free paper grades, but from then on it concentrated on wood-containing grades based on pulp from its own mill, and colored paper became a specialty.

=== New difficulties ===
The 1960s and 1970s were difficult for Vittingfos Tresliperi og Papirfabrik, as for many other wood-processing companies, but the company pressed ahead. In 1974 it leased the premises of the closed Vestfos Cellulose in Øvre Eiker and began production there with about 100 employees, but operations at Vestfossen stopped again after little more than a year, and a shortfall in orders brought layoffs at Hvittingfoss too.

The management saw that prices for the factory's paper types were not keeping pace with rising production costs, and turned the focus toward more refined paper ranges that could fetch higher prices. To that end it began cooperating with the Englishman Len Carrington Moule, who had developed recipes for copying pulp for self-copying paper, and in 1976–1977 the factory invested in a new coating unit for such paper and also took up recycled-pulp production. The debt, however, was too large.

A/S Vittingfoss went bankrupt in the summer of 1978, with creditors owed 53 million kroner and 113 employees facing the loss of their jobs. Many took hope when, only a couple of weeks later, the estate administrators won the probate court's approval to form an interim company, AS Nye Vittingfoss, to run the factory for at least a year; it bought the facilities from the estate for 5.5 million kroner. Beset by technical and financial problems, the new Vittingfoss company also went bankrupt in 1980. This time the estate administrators sold off the stocks and production equipment, and the factory's largest paper machine was dismantled and shipped to India, bringing paper production at Hvittingfoss to a definitive end.

== Bibliography ==
- Evju, Hans (1934). «Vittingfoss Bruk», in Skogeieren no. 2, 1934.
- Kittilsen, Ingolf (1947). Vittingfossen i industriens tjeneste 1647–1947. Oslo: Fabritius & Sønners forlag.
- Tråen, Even (2001). «Vannet som energikilde», in Livet langs Numedalslågen. pp. 144–156.
