= Skotselv Cellulosefabrik =

Norwegian cellulose factory

- Formerly: Skotselv Cellulose
- Company type: Aksjeselskap
- Industry: Pulp and paper
- Founded: 1888
- Defunct: 1978
- Fate: Production consolidated at Skien
- Headquarters: Skotselv, Øvre Eiker, Buskerud, Norway
- Products: Sulfite cellulose

Skotselv Cellulosefabrik was an industrial company that produced sulfite cellulose at Skotselv in Øvre Eiker, Buskerud. The company was established in 1888 and closed in 1978.

== History ==
Skotselv Cellulosefabrik was built on old sawmill sites by the Bingselva river in 1888. A range of interested parties among forest owners, timber merchants, industrial investors, and local people bought shares in the new firm, among them Georg Thilesen of Drammen. The local business community was represented by the Bache and Kiøsterud families, the firm Gregersen & Mørch of Modum, Otto G. Rømcke, and P. Ltz. Aass. The brothers-in-law Gregersen and Mørch were probably the leading figures behind the plant; they had founded Kongssagene Brug at Åmot in 1870 and had bought up Hassel Jernverk and the sawmills in Skotselv.

Harald Bugge held the chief technical responsibility at startup, assisted by Th. Quiller and Erland Kiøsterud. Quiller was the one with industry experience, having spent two years at a cellulose factory in the United States. As built, with six boilers, the plant had a capacity of 2,000 tonnes of cellulose a year.

Cellulose production at Skotselv worked well, with fewer problems than the plant started at Vestfossen two years earlier. Toward the end of the 1890s the equipment was modernized and replaced so that 7,000 tonnes a year could be produced. Problems soon followed, however. In 1903 the boiler house burned down, after which the entire factory underwent extensive fireproofing, one measure being the replacement of wooden beams with steel ones. Further improvements followed through the 1900s, and by 1910 the plant had an annual production of 10,000 tonnes.

This was a considerable increase from the 2,000 tonnes a year at startup, and such growth required a large workforce, so the company became one of the district's largest employers early on. Even before the First World War it had over 100 employees.

=== Union takes over ===
Further expansion required capital, and a chance for new investment came when Union Co gained the share majority in Skotselv Cellulose in 1914. After Union's takeover, a new log haul was built for the timber supply and a new turbine plant was installed, and the company gradually began using electric power in addition to steam. As part of the Union group, it made sense to exploit the operational advantages of the other companies Union owned in the area, and a high-voltage line was therefore built from Embretsfos Fabrikker to Skotselv in 1916. At this point the company employed about 165 people.

=== Labor conflicts ===
Workplaces that gathered many people, such as Skotselv Cellulose, were fertile ground for union formation. Many unions were founded in the wood-processing industry after the dissolution of the union with Sweden in 1905, and there was almost a wave of organizing in the Drammen watercourse in 1906. Skotselv Cellulosearbeideres Fagforening was one of many unions founded that year, prompted by the good times the industry was enjoying just after the dissolution.

For the companies it was important to take advantage of the good prices. The management at Skotselv Cellulosefabrik therefore wanted to extend working hours with a Saturday-night shift and had obtained a dispensation from the Factory Inspectorate to do so. The workers at Skotselv protested, and Skotselv Cellulosearbeideres Fagforening was founded to have the extension annulled. The founding meeting was held on Sunday, 28 January 1906. Andreas P. Daler became chairman, Gustav Iversen deputy chairman, and Martin Horgen secretary, with Karl Knive, Oluf Jensen, Johan Torgersen, and Gustav Hære as the other board members. A few weeks later, a meeting was held with cellulose workers from Krogstad, Mjøndalen, Vestfos, Katfos, Embretsfos, and Hellefos, which resulted in a joint appeal from the workers to the government.

The workers protested against the holiday work, and management discontinued the seventh shift in the summer of 1906. This opened a less turbulent period up to the First World War. The major tensions in working life came after the war, whose aftereffects were extensive. In 1921 a conflict arose that also struck the wood-processing industry. A sympathy strike with the seamen brought 100,000 workers into the dispute. Prices fell and sales of wood-processing products were poor, the employers demanded wage reductions, and a two-month lockout followed. The workers eventually had to give in, and wages fell. Ten years later the employers again demanded wage cuts, this time of 15 percent. A long, hard conflict followed; the workers rejected the demand and were locked out, and eventually had to accept a reduction of 8 percent.

Another conflict that struck the wood-processing industry was the Randsfjord conflict of 1929 to 1934, which also involved the Skotselv cellulose factory. It began as a log-floating dispute in Etna-Dokka, with Skog og Land as the central actor on the workers' side. The struggle widened in 1933 when floaters organized in the Paper Union were called out on strike and replaced with strikebreakers. The conflict sharpened further as the Paper Union called the factory workers out in a sympathy strike, bringing 17 factories and 2,300 workers at wood-processing companies in the Drammen watercourse into the dispute. Confrontations between police and workers were very intense, and the conflict was finally resolved through negotiations led by the national mediator.

=== Modernization and increased production ===
Despite the tensions and turbulence in working life, the factory was further modernized and improved during the more settled periods of the interwar years. The engineer Johs. B. Knobel led the most extensive measures. A rebuilding of the wood-cleaning plant in 1928 opened a period of major equipment replacement. A new press for wet cellulose was started in 1935, and the new Kamyr machine reduced the crew needed per shift. Two years later Knobel led a rebuilding of the cellulose boilers that made it possible to produce 12 tonnes of cellulose per boiler per cook. Under Union's management, Skotselv Cellulosefabrik thus survived the interwar crises and took part in the upturn after the Second World War.

Several rebuildings provided the basis for increased production combined with crew reductions. In the early 1950s the factory produced just under 20,000 tonnes of cellulose a year, for which it needed 130 employees. Production capacity improved further through the 1960s, so that by the start of the 1970s the plant could produce 35,000 tonnes of cellulose, yet the number of employees did not rise; producing nearly 32,000 tonnes in 1971 required about 80 workers. The modernization measures thus gave the company a substantial gain in efficiency.

=== Closure ===
Through the 1970s the major structural upheaval in the wood-processing industry also became apparent to the Union group, and there was no way around reducing the number of plants. It was decided that all cellulose production would take place at the plant in Skien, and in 1978 the Skotselv factory was closed.

== Bibliography ==
- Ek, Bent (1998). Fabrikken ved Hellefossen. Borregaard Hellefos 1898–1998. Hokksund, p. 72.
- Ek, Bent. «Da «Fabrikken» ble nedlagt», in Julehefte for Vestfossen 1997.
- Ek, Bent. Den første nogenlunde vellykkede cellulosefabrikk i Norge, article in Eikerbladet.
- Haakonsen, Ronald, ed. 125 år. Union 1873–1998. Skien, pp. 76, 78, 80, 81.
- Kaldal, Ingar (1989). Papirarbeidernes historie. Norsk Papirindustriarbeiderforbund 1913–1988. Oslo, pp. 22, 45, 111–112, 297, 304, 486.
- Moen, Eli (1998). The Decline of the Pulp and Paper Industry in Norway, 1950–1980. Oslo, p. 289.
- Skotselv Cellulosearbeideres Fagforening 50 år 1906–1956.
- Strømme Svendsen, Arnljot (1973). Union 1873–1973. Oslo.
- Teigen, Karin Lieng. «Skotselv cellulosefabrikk» in Eikerminne, 1985.
- Union nytt 3/1952, nr. 2, pp. 8–9.
