= Arvika Municipality =

Arvika Municipality Arvika kommun
- Municipality
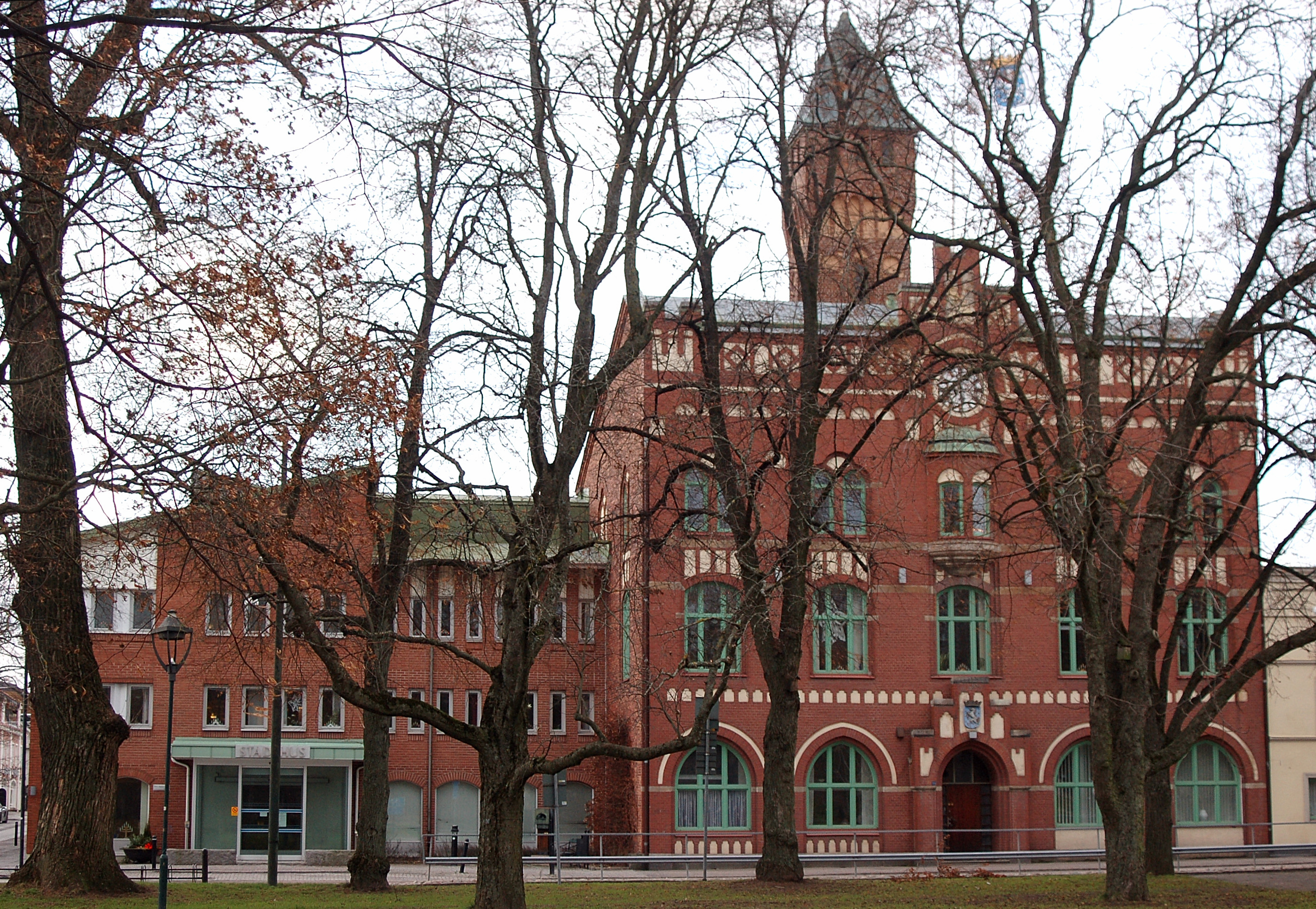
- Arvika Town Hall

- Coat of arms

- Coordinates: 59°39′N 12°35′E
- Country: Sweden
- County: Värmland County
- Seat: Arvika

Area
  - Total: 1,956.13 km^{2} (755.27 sq mi)
  - Land: 1,649.06 km^{2} (636.71 sq mi)
  - Water: 307.07 km^{2} (118.56 sq mi)
- Area as of 1 January 2014.

Population (30 June 2025)
  - Total: 25,443
  - Density: 15.429/km^{2} (39.960/sq mi)
- Time zone: UTC+1 (CET)
  - Summer (DST): UTC+2 (CEST)
- ISO 3166 code: SE
- Province: Värmland
- Municipal code: 1784
- Website: www.arvika.se

Arvika Municipality (Swedish: Arvika kommun) is a municipality in Värmland County in west central Sweden. Its seat is located in the city of Arvika.

The present municipality was created in 1971 when the former City of Arvika was amalgamated with five rural municipalities of Glava, Gunnarskog, Älgå, Brunskog and Stavnäs.

Arvika is most known for the annual Arvika Festival that attracts international artists.

== Localities ==
- Arvika (seat)
- Edane
- Glava
- Gunnarskog
- Jössefors
- Klässbol
- Sulvik
- Åmotfors (partly)

== Demographics ==
This is a demographic table based on Arvika Municipality's electoral districts in the 2022 Swedish general election sourced from SVT's election platform, in turn taken from SCB official statistics.

In total there were 25,838 residents, including 19,885 Swedish citizens of voting age. 50.5% voted for the left coalition and 48.6% for the right coalition. Indicators are in percentage points except population totals and income.

Location	Residents	Citizen adults	Left vote	Right vote	Employed	Swedish parents	Foreign heritage	Income SEK	Degree
Location			%	%					
Agneteberg	2,520	1,866	50.5	48.8	74	79	21	23,474	29
Degerängen	1,424	1,010	57.3	41.7	77	77	23	25,911	31
Dottevik	1,552	1,120	54.5	43.8	65	72	28	20,548	39
Edane-Mangskog	2,670	2,028	50.3	49.0	85	92	8	25,446	36
Glava	972	724	46.9	51.9	72	83	17	20,590	24
Gunnarskog-Bogen	1,937	1,518	41.8	57.7	83	91	9	24,764	28
Haga	1,260	1,030	51.4	47.5	78	88	12	23,790	30
Jössefors	1,325	991	43.0	56.4	78	90	10	26,552	29
Minneberg	1,464	1,176	53.3	45.0	72	78	22	21,998	32
Rosendal	1,255	1,017	52.8	46.5	79	83	17	25,712	33
Solberga	1,986	1,686	57.8	41.0	69	79	21	19,079	35
Solvik	1,615	1,249	50.7	48.8	86	94	6	28,410	38
Stavnäs-Högerud	1,418	1,091	47.3	52.0	85	91	9	25,712	30
Styckåsen	1,382	1,134	61.1	38.5	67	76	24	18,497	28
Taserud	1,340	953	52.0	47.3	86	87	13	28,520	47
Älgå-Ny	1,718	1,292	42.5	57.3	85	90	10	26,020	28
Source: SVT

== Notable natives ==
- Kenny Bräck, racing driver
- Per Eklund, rally and rallycross driver
- Tommy Kristoffersson, rallycross and racing driver
- Håkan Hagegård, opera singer
- Kjellaug Nordsjö, icon painter
- August Warberg, actor
- Jacob de la Rose, ice hockey player
- Hjalmar Frisell, military commander and sport shooter

== Politics ==
Result of the 2018 municipality election (loss or gain from 2014 elections):

- Moderate Party 18.36% ▲ (+3.35%)
- Centre Party 12.46% ▲ (+2.02%)
- Liberals 3.37% ▼ (−1.04%)
- Christian Democrats 2.84% ▲ (+0.92%)
- Swedish Social Democratic Party 39.18% ▼ (−7.53%)
- Left Party 6.75% ▼ (−0.35%)
- Green Party 3.05% ▼ (−2.32%)
- Sweden Democrats 11.95% ▲ (+3.38%)
- Feminist Initiative 1.87 ▲ (+1.66%)
- Other parties 0.16% ▼ (−0.08%)
