= Skotselv =

- Village
- Dyvelgården, Skotselv

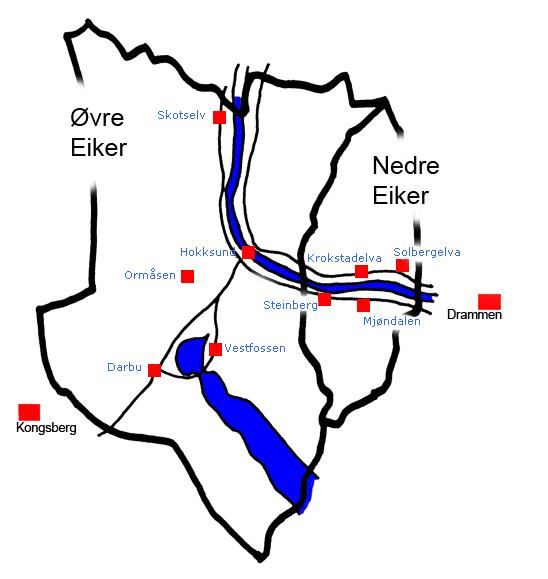
- Local map

- Location in Norway
- Coordinates: 59°50′50″N 9°53′5″E
- Country: Norway
- Region: Østlandet
- County: Buskerud
- Municipality: Øvre Eiker

Area
  - Total: 0.96 km^{2} (0.37 sq mi)

Population (2011)
  - Total: 680
- Time zone: UTC+01 (CET)
  - Summer (DST): UTC+02 (CEST)

Skotselv is a village in the municipality of Øvre Eiker, Norway. Its population (2005) is 684, of which 8 people live within the border of the neighbouring municipality of Modum. It has a railway station on the Randsfjord Line.

== History ==
Skotselv as a small village has existed since the Viking Age. At that time the main river, now called Drammenselva, rose 4 to 5 metres (13 to 16 ft) higher than today's level, making transport and trade by ship highly accessible. The village first started to grow significantly during the first half of the 16th century when the powerful Ulleland family established several sawmills along the river, using the river as a mean of transporting the goods to the region's capital, Drammen.

Hassel jernverk Thomas Fearnley (1854)

Overview with lumber freight on the river, cellulose mill to the left. (1970)

=== Iron Mill period ===
In 1649, Hassel Ironworks (Hassel jernverk) started operation as the area's first iron mill, which was run by the Hassel family . They mainly produced ovens, but expanded into general ironware factory later on. It continued to be the biggest influence on the community until it was finally closed down in 1888.

=== Cellulose Mill period ===
Established the same year as the iron mill shut down, the Skotselv Cellulose Mill (Skotselv Cellullosefabrikk) remained Skotselv's most important workplace. Several modernizations were made during the first part of the 20th century and the company was sold to Labor Union in 1913. The new ownership managed to turn the tide and the growth lasted all the time to 1978 when it was closed for good.

=== Skotselv Power Station ===
Skotselv Power Station (Skotselv Kraftverk) is a hydroelectric dam on the Bingselva. It has installed a Kaplan turbine. The power plant uses the fall in the river. It is owned and operated by Øvre Eiker Energi AS.

== Local attractions ==
- Düvelgården - historic manor house associated with Hassel jernverk
- Bingenselven - local park suitable for camping and outdoor grilling

== Notable people ==
- Timo André Bakken - cross-country skier
- Nikolai Eilertsen - bass guitarist
- Christopher Hornsrud (1859–1960)- Prime Minister of Norway from January to February 1928

== Picture gallery ==
Skotselv Mission Church

Skotselv School

Bingenselven

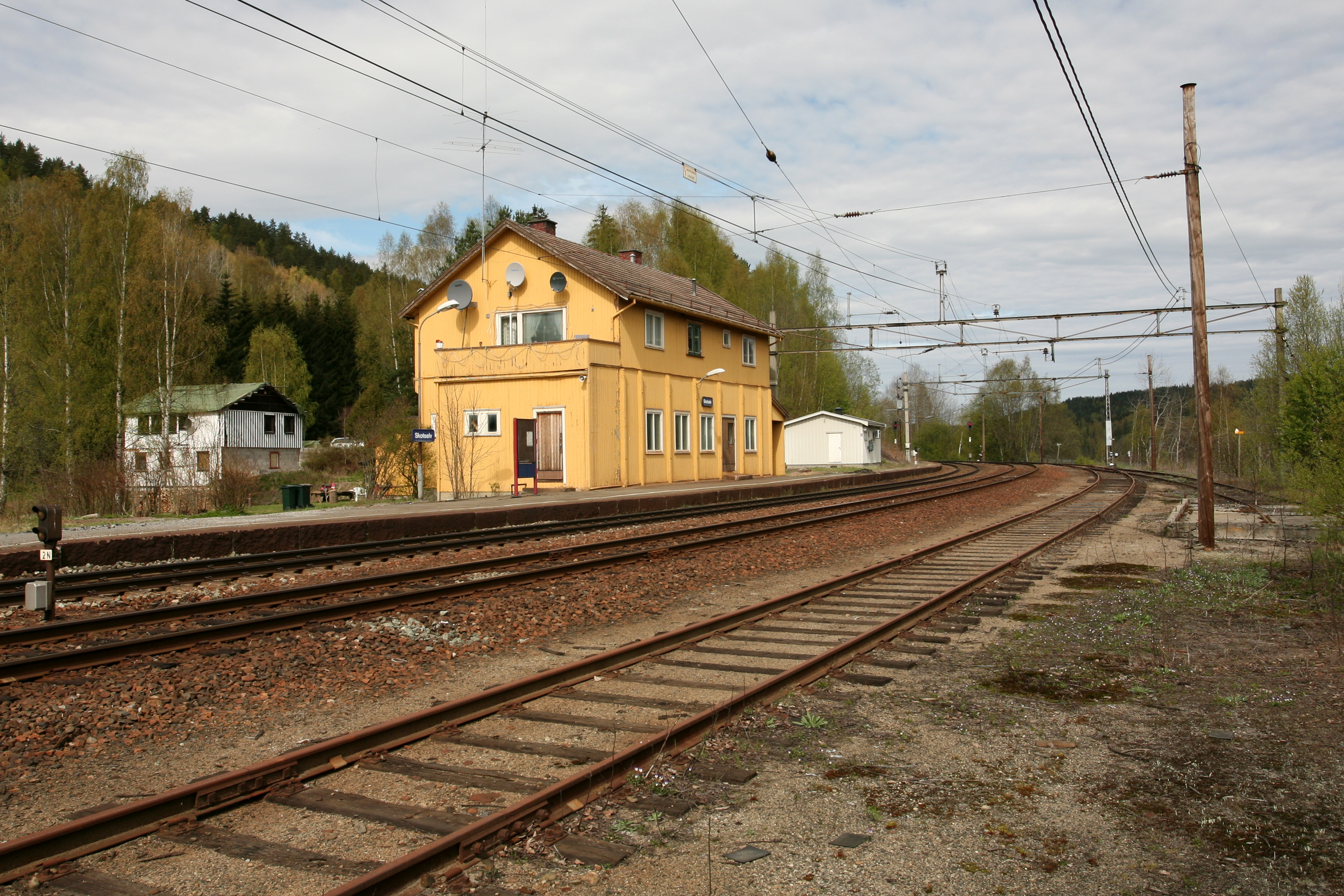
Skotselv Railway Station

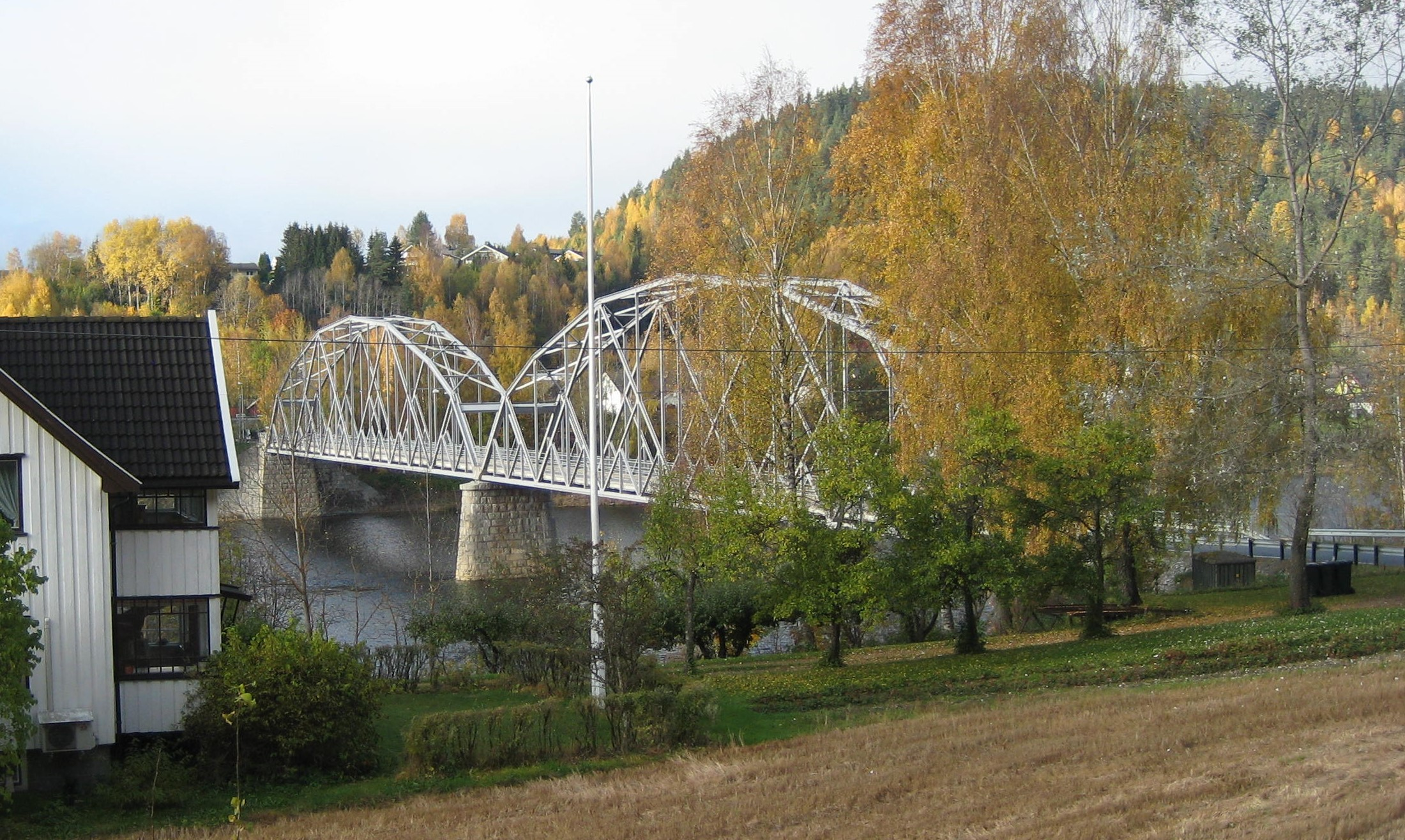
Skotselv Bridge over the Drammenselva

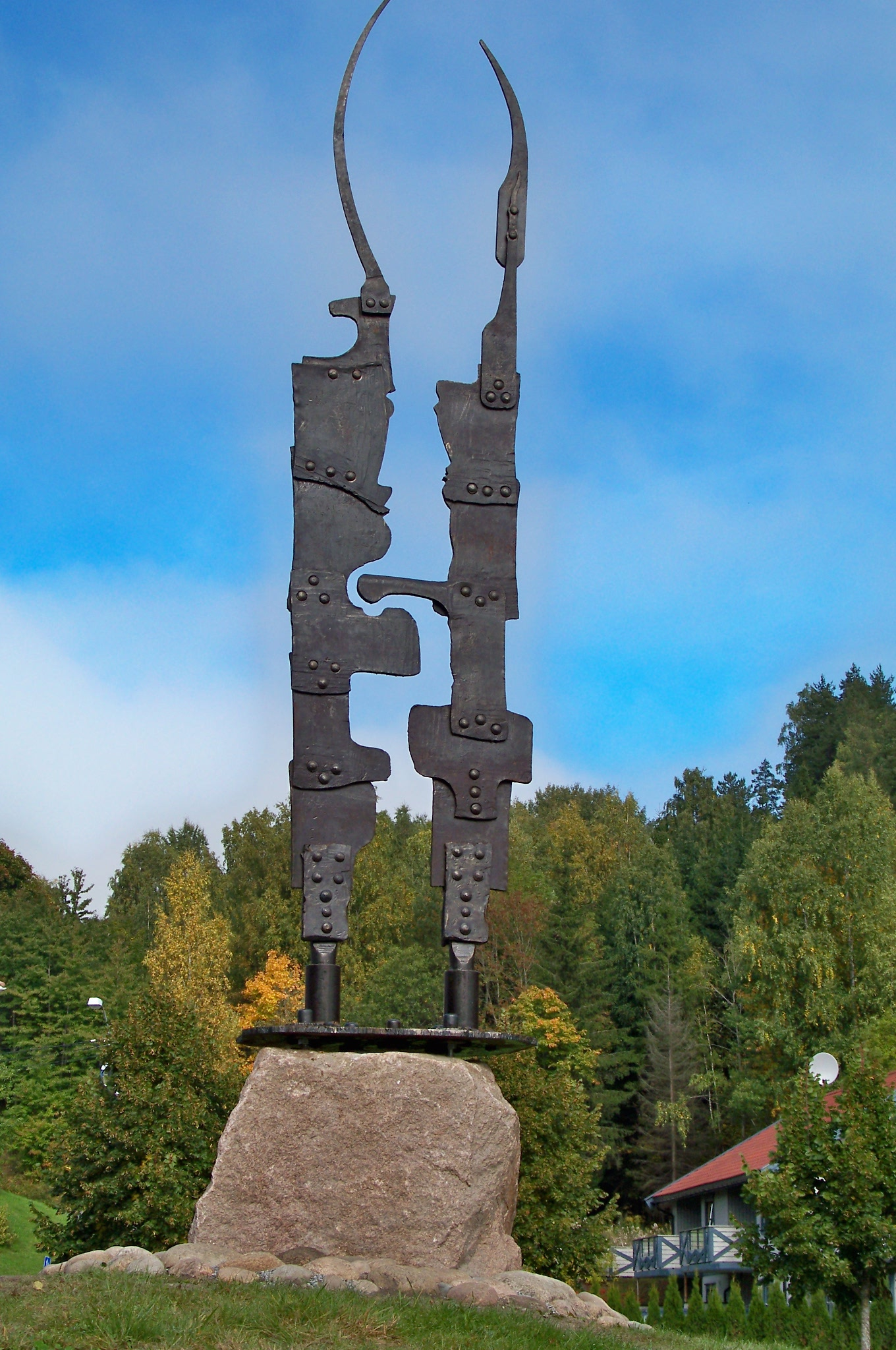
We Are Two
by Arek Arkadiusz Gawecki
