= Embretsfos Fabrikker =

Norwegian wood-processing company

- Formerly: Embretsfos Træsliberi; AS Akerselven-Embretsfos
- Company type: Aksjeselskap
- Industry: Pulp and paper
- Founded: 1872
- Defunct: 1971
- Headquarters: Åmot, Modum, Buskerud, Norway
- Products: Paper, wood pulp, cellulose, tanning extract

Embretsfos Fabrikker was an industrial company in Åmot in Modum municipality that produced paper, wood pulp, cellulose, and tanning extract by the Drammen River. The company was established in 1872, with the cellulose plant put into operation in 1872, the paper mill in 1905, and the tanning extract operation in 1915. It was closed in 1971.

== History ==
Embretsfos Træsliberi was established in Åmot in 1872, when the engineer Johan Ricard Lied bought parts of Embretsfossen for 3,000 speciedaler, close to 12,000 kroner, intending to build a wood-grinding mill. The machinery was supplied by Myrens Verksted, and the founding capital was 22,000 speciedaler, close to 90,000 kroner.

=== The wood-grinding plant ===
Production began in the early summer of 1874 on two horizontal grinding machines driven by a 200 hp turbine. The mill ran with these two machines for six years before modernization began. In 1880 the management adopted a series of improvements that gave the factory six machines, a drying house, and various water and pulp control devices, raising annual production two and a half times; from the 1880s onward the wood pulp was also packed in bales rather than boxes.

Improvements to the wood-grinding mill resumed in 1887, when four new machines were installed, bringing the mill to a full capacity of 10,000 tonnes of pulp a year. Nine years later it burned down, and the reconstruction and expansion that followed left the company with a production capacity of 29,000 tonnes by 1898. With its ten grinding machines, Embretsfos was then among the largest wood-grinding mills in the country.

Ownership changed in the 1890s. In 1893 Akerselvens Papirfabrikker took over Embretsfos, which changed its name to AS Akerselven-Embretsfos. When Akerselvens Papirfabrikker closed in 1898, Embretsfos continued on its own as Embretsfos Fabrikker. From 1905 the Union group in Skien grew more involved by taking charge of selling the company's paper, beginning a long relationship that was formalized when Embretsfos Fabrikker joined the Union group in 1911; from then on Union's director also managed Embretsfos Fabrikker.

=== Cellulose and paper production ===
The company began with wood pulp, but in 1895 it took up the production of sulfite cellulose, buying boilers from Sweden and a sulfur furnace from Germany. Other improvements in the 1890s included a bark drum, a log conveyor, and greater use of hydraulics. By 1896 the company produced 6,000 tonnes of cellulose a year.

Wood pulp and cellulose were not enough for Embretsfos, and the management decided in 1904 to add paper production. The large plant that was built made the company one of the largest producers of newsprint in Norway, behind only Borregaard and Skotfoss Bruk. As the seller of Embretsfos paper, Union Co was closely involved in the development. Two identical machines were installed, each 110 inches wide and running at 110 m/min and capable of 6,000 tonnes of newsprint a year; the first went into operation in late autumn 1905 and PM 2 in the spring of 1906.

=== Modernization and expansions ===
The paper mill's equipment was thoroughly modernized twice before the Second World War. The first round, in the 1920s, raised each machine's capacity to 2,000 tonnes, bringing total annual production to 16,000 tonnes. The larger improvement came in 1930, when PM 2, in operation since 1906, was replaced by a machine of 142 inches working width and a capacity of 15,000–16,000 tonnes of newsprint a year, raising total capacity to 24,000 tonnes.

The grinding mill saw some improvements in the early 1900s as well, including more powerful turbines, but no fundamental change until 1950, prompted by a fire in 1948 that destroyed the old equipment. Official approval of the new facility took some time, but a new grinding mill was rebuilt by 1950. Where the plant had held a capacity of nearly 35,000 tonnes of pulp before the fire, the new mill could produce 45,000 tonnes a year.

The sulfite factory was also improved repeatedly through the 20th century. Its renewal in 1910 replaced four small boilers with one large one, raising annual production to 10,000 tonnes of wet pulp, or 5,000 tonnes dry. Production reached 6,000 tonnes a year in the 1920s, and once the worst of the interwar crises had passed, the management carried out a major modernization in 1937 that nearly doubled annual production to 10,000 tonnes of dry cellulose. During the Second World War the factory was an important producer of feed cellulose. The plant closed in 1959.

The company also took on a further line of production. Faced with the shortage of tanning extract during the First World War, Embretsfos began making tannic acid from evaporated sulfite liquor in 1916. The evaporated liquor was also used as a glue and binder in foundry sand. This use of the waste liquor continued until 1952.

=== The trade union ===
Trade unions formed at many wood-processing companies in the Drammen watercourse in 1906, and Embretsfos was no exception. Branch no. 19 of the Norwegian Paper Industry Workers' Union was founded on 1 February 1906 by workers from Katfos and Embretsfos, and was at first called the Modum Paper and Pulp Workers' Union. When the Katfos employees formed their own union later that year, it took its final name, the Embretsfos Paper and Pulp Workers' Union.

After the Norwegian Paper Industry Workers' Union (NPF) was founded in 1913, part of the Embretsfos union left the older Workers' Union for the new one. From July 1913 to April 1914 the branch was split between the two, a period of frequent internal disputes; the disputes ended in April 1914, when all organized paper workers joined the NPF.

The union had 60 members when it began in 1906, all from Embretsfos, and 240 by that July. In 1956, at the company's peak, the Embretsfos Paper and Pulp Workers' Union had 340 affiliated workers.

Two conflicts stood out before the Second World War. The first was the 1931 lockout, which affected an average of 60,000 workers nationwide over the course of the dispute (see Battle of Menstad) and had a significant impact at Embretsfos Fabrikker, where wage cuts of up to 20–30 percent were demanded; by the end, wages had been reduced by six percent. The second was the Randsfjord conflict of 1930–1934, which began as a log-floating dispute and spread to industry through sympathy strikes at 17 factories in the Drammen watercourse, Embretsfos among them.

=== From heyday to closure ===
The first postwar years, up to the mid-1950s, were a golden period for the company, with steadily rising production and a workforce of nearly 350. The changes that followed set in during the late 1950s and took full effect through the 1960s. As the historian Ingar Kaldal wrote, the production had been shut down piece by piece, the cellulose in the 1950s and a paper machine in 1963. The factory was too small and newsprint sales had failed, and operations could no longer be maintained. When the gates closed in 1971, 140 jobs were lost. The company had remained part of the Union group until the end.

== Bibliography ==
- Kaldal, Ingar (1989). Papirarbeidernes historie. Norsk Papirindustriarbeiderforbund 1913–1988. Oslo, pp. 22, 34, 47, 93, 127, 153, 159, 176, 192, 194, 297, 302ff, 313.
- Embretsfoss papir- og tremassearbeiderforening 50 år. 1955.
- Moen, Eli (1993). Modum – ei bygd med tre elver. Industrialiseringen av ei østlandsbygd 1870–1940. Modum, pp. 31–42, 174–180.
- Norsk Skogindustri, no. 12/1971.
- Strømme Svendsen, Arnljot (1973). Union 1873–1973. En norsk treforedlingsbedrifts liv og eksistenskamp. Oslo, pp. 112–114.
- «Det nye sliperiet ved A/S Embretsfos Fabrikker», unsigned article in Norsk Skogindustri 1950, pp. 349–350.
- «Embretsfoss Fabrikker», unsigned article in Union Nytt no. 6(8), 1951.
