= Skjærdalens Brug =

Norwegian pulp and paper company

- Formerly: Skjærdalens Træsliberi
- Type: Aksjeselskap
- Industry: Pulp and paper
- Founded: 1882
- Defunct: 2013
- Fate: Bankruptcy
- Headquarters: Tyristrand, Ringerike, Buskerud, Norway
- Products: Wood pulp, paper, tissue paper, napkins

Skjærdalens Brug was a Norwegian wood-processing company at Tyristrand in Ringerike. The company was founded in 1882 as a wood-grinding mill (closed in 1931) and was expanded with a paper factory in 1906–1907. The factory ran five paper machines and a converting department for paper goods, producing among other things napkins and silk paper.

In 2007 the factory was bought by Andersen's Emballasje & Design AS. In 2013 the company filed for bankruptcy, which led to the factory being closed.

== Wood-grinding mill ==
There had been a sawmill at Skjærdalen since the mid-1600s. It was consul Jens Gram who in 1882 initiated the establishment of what later became Skjærdalens Brug, and he was the driving force behind its development from a traditional sawmill into a modern wood-processing company. Wood processing at Tyristrand began with the founding of Skjærdalens Træsliberi in 1882. The mill was built on the Skjerva river, with an annual production of 1,400 tonnes of wood pulp at startup. In 1884 production was expanded to 2,400 tonnes. Gram continued the expansion, and a second mill was built in 1887, three kilometers further up the river, allowing the company to produce 2,800 tonnes of wood pulp a year.

By 1906 the company was equipped with two grinding machines and five boilers. The five boilers were probably part of the production of brown wood pulp, which required the wood to be heated beforehand to 140–150 degrees, a process that gave a strong long-fibered pulp. At this facility the company produced 4,500 tonnes of wood pulp a year. It was a common pattern to start as a wood-grinding mill and then move on to cellulose and paper production. Skjærdalen nearly followed this line of development, but here production moved directly to paper in 1906/1907.

== Paper factory ==
The mill burned down in 1906 and was quickly rebuilt, with a new wood-grinding mill and sawmill put in place. A paper factory was also set up, consisting of one machine that produced brown paper based on the company's own wood pulp. Production began in 1907, and the machine had a capacity of 2,000 tonnes a year. The sawmill was also rebuilt after the fire, but with the installation of the paper machine the importance of the sawmill operation was reduced.

From then on Skjærdalen was associated with paper and pulp production. The company underwent several conversions and rebuildings up to the First World War, but combined operation with both wood pulp and paper production was continued. Around the First World War, with a production of 2,000 tonnes on one machine, the company had 130 employees, of whom 110 were men and 20 were women. A trade union for the employees was established in 1912 under the name Skjærdalens Brug fagforening.

The company worked on plans for a sulfite cellulose factory in 1914. The factory was projected next to the local cemetery, which provoked negative reactions. A neighbor assessment was demanded, but the assessment accepted Gram's plans, so there were no formal obstacles to the owner building a factory with a chimney at least 60 meters high on the site, provided that the waste water ran in a closed channel down to Tyrifjorden. The facility was never built. Eight years after the fire the company went bankrupt. In 1914 Karl Melbye came in as owner, and he took over as director in 1915. From 1915 Skjærdalens Brug was a joint-stock company with the Melbye family as principal owners, and for over 90 years the Melbye family were dominant and driving forces in the company's development.

== Tissue paper as a niche product ==
In the 1930s an effort was made toward extensive expansion with a full focus on tissue paper. The raw material was purchased from outside. The machine called PM II was installed in 1931, and production of the thin silk paper, MF tissue, was started. The machine had an annual capacity of 2,000 tonnes. This paper quality was used, among other things, as gift and wrapping paper. The original wood-grinding operation ceased at the same time PM II was installed.

The wood-processing industry underwent extensive reorganizations and restructurings after the Second World War. These changes in working methods and machinery did not affect Skjærdalens Brug to the same degree. Production of silk paper and other fine qualities in a distinctly niche market continued with small changes in working methods and technology, but the factory was expanded a number of times.

In 1964 the company installed the paper machine that had been in operation at Vestfos Cellulosefabrik. PM II, as it was called at Vestfos, became PM IV at Skjærdalens Brug. The machine was 50 years old when it was installed at Skjærdalen in 1964. New machines were also started in 1967 and 1974. After the last new installation, Skjærdalens Brug had six paper machines, on which it produced silk paper, napkins, kitchen rolls, toilet paper, and fruit wrap. In 1978 Skjærdalen produced 14,000 tonnes of paper, on four machines. The special qualities were made with the help of a technology that placed great demands on the machine operators. Although the product range was expanded to cover many qualities, the silk paper, the tissue, produced on two machines, was a hallmark of Skjærdalen since the start of silk paper production in 1931.

For much of the postwar period the company managed to employ around 200 people. As late as 1986 there were 195 workers at Skjærdalens Brug. The major change came in the 1990s, when the workforce was substantially reduced. By 2002 there were 85 who worked there daily. During this period the economy grew steadily more difficult. Chinese competitors with low production costs had achieved a quality and delivery punctuality that challenged the Tyristrand company in Great Britain, which was its most important export market. The factory's situation was not eased by rising energy costs, or by the owning company's substantial share investments losing value dramatically in the downturn that followed the September 2001 attacks in New York. In 2006 the silk paper machine was stopped, but napkin production continued with only 16 employees.

In the autumn of 2007, when Skjærdalens Brug would have celebrated its 100th anniversary, the company's bank refused further credit because of its red balance sheets. The business was rescued when the wholesale firm Andersen's Emballasje & Design AS in Flekkefjord, which saw opportunities in the fact that the Tyristrand factory still had about two-thirds of the napkin deliveries on the Norwegian market, took it over. Production continued under the name Skjærdalens AS. Demand for the napkins remained good, but market prices were low. In 2013 the parent company Andersen's Emballasje & Design went bankrupt, and this time no one was interested in taking over the napkin production, so the last 12 employees had to find other work.

== Bibliography ==
- Buskerud Amt Jubilæumsskrift 1814–1914. Drammen, pp. 300–301.
- Heieren, Reidar: «Et eventyr på tynt papir», 2 pages. Account of Heieren's film about Skjærdalens Brug.
- Kaldal, Ingar (1989). Papirarbeidernes historie. Norsk Papirindustriarbeiderforbund 1913–1988. Oslo, p. 585.
- Sørstrøm, Raymond (2002). Skjærdalen – Stedet og bedriften ved Skjærdalselva på Tyristrand. Skjærdalens Brug fagforening. Tyristrand.
