= Vestfossen =

Village in Øvre Eiker, Buskerud, Norway

Coordinates: 59°43′47″N 9°52′11″E

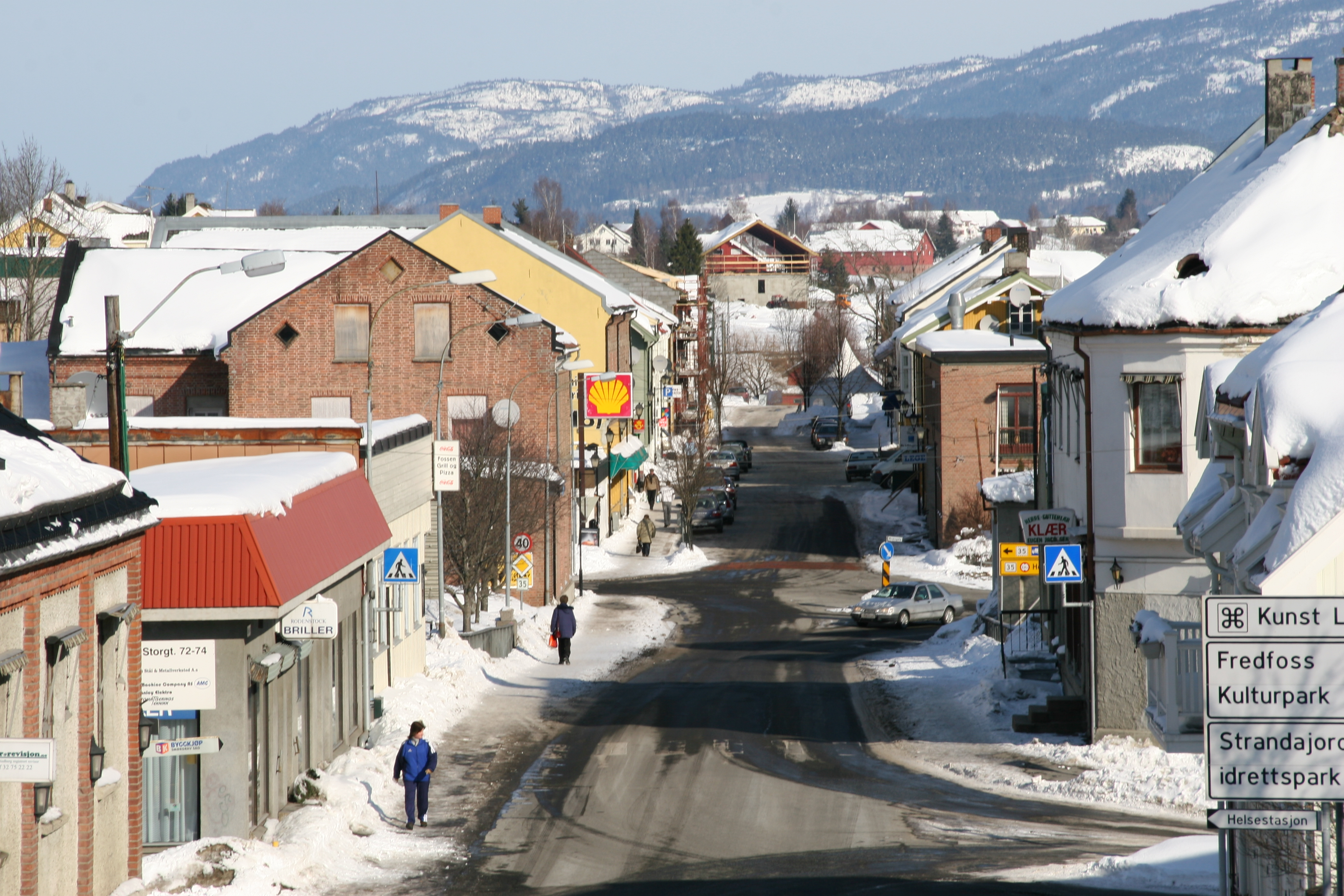
Storgata, main street of Vestfossen

Vestfossen is a village in the municipality of Øvre Eiker in the county of Buskerud, Norway. For the purposes of Statistics Norway, the settlement is an urban area.

Vestfossen is a former industrial city with traditions dating back to the 16th century. As of 2008 Vestfossen had a population of 2,867 according to Statistics Norway.

== History ==
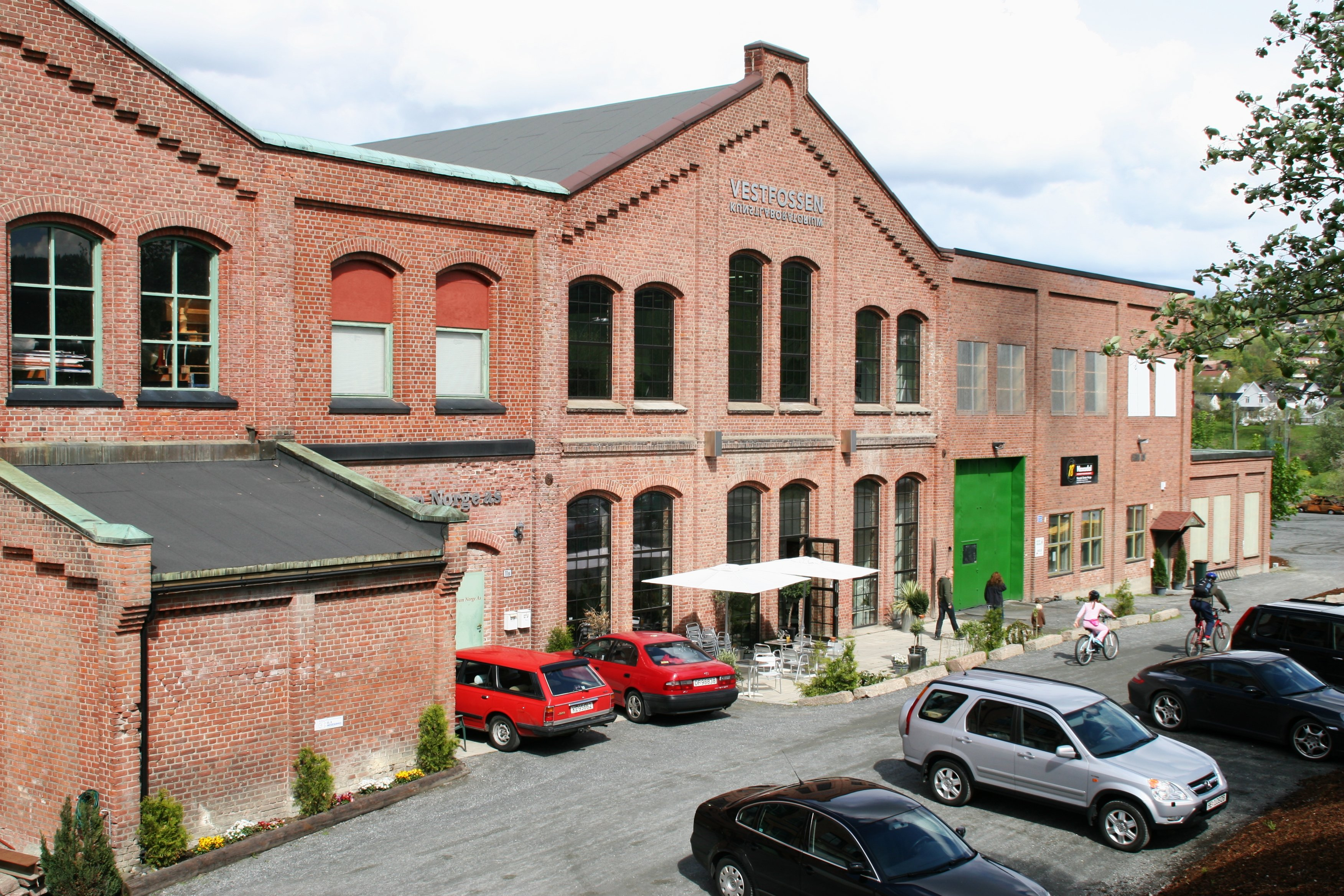
Vestfossen Kunstlaboratorium, formerly Vestfos Cellulosefabrik

The development of Vestfossen and its industrial tradition started during the 1500s. At that time, the manor house known as Fossesholm (Fossesholm Herregård) became the center of a land collecting effort for the purpose of creating a large-scale sawmill industry. Later, other types of industry emerged. The most influential among them were the Fredfos Wool Factory (Fredfos Uldvarefabrik) and the Vestfos Cellulose Factory (Vestfos Cellulosefabrik), a former paper company founded in 1886 as a pulp mill, which operated until declaring bankruptcy in 1967.

An industrial crisis which occurred around 1970 led to the fall of these factories, and large parts of the local industrial infrastructure was unused for a long time. After the year 2000, a cultural effort led to the establishment of several cultural institutions here, most notably the contemporary art gallery of the Vestfossen Art Laboratory (Vestfossen Kunstlaboratorium) founded by artist Morten Viskum. Exhibitions have featured works by Roy Lichtenstein, Claes Oldenburg, Anselm Kiefer, Joseph Beuys, Louise Bourgeois, Cindy Sherman, Bjarne Melgaard, Henrik Sørensen and Harald Sohlberg. Vestfossen now calls itself "the capital of culture".

== Geography ==
Vestfosselva River runs through Vestfossen, flowing out from the two contiguous lakes Fiskumvannet and Eikeren. Vestfosselva is the largest tributary of the Drammenselva. Vestfossen waterfall is dammed and has a power station, Vestfossen kraftverk. On the lower side of the waterfall, the river continued to Hokksund, where it splits into two rivers, Nøstelva and Loeselva, both of which flow into the Drammenselva.

== Fosseholm Manor House ==
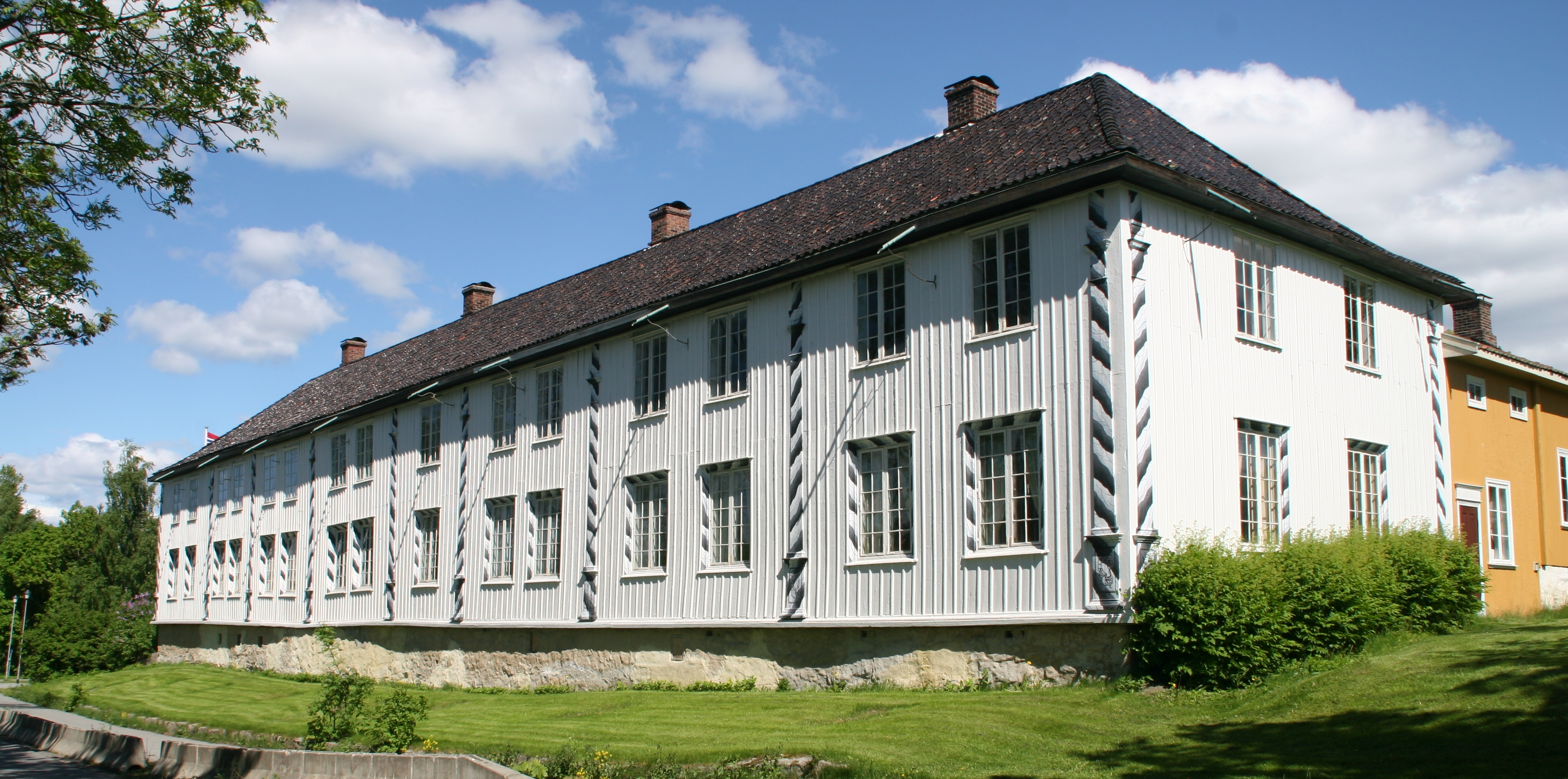
Fossesholm Manor House

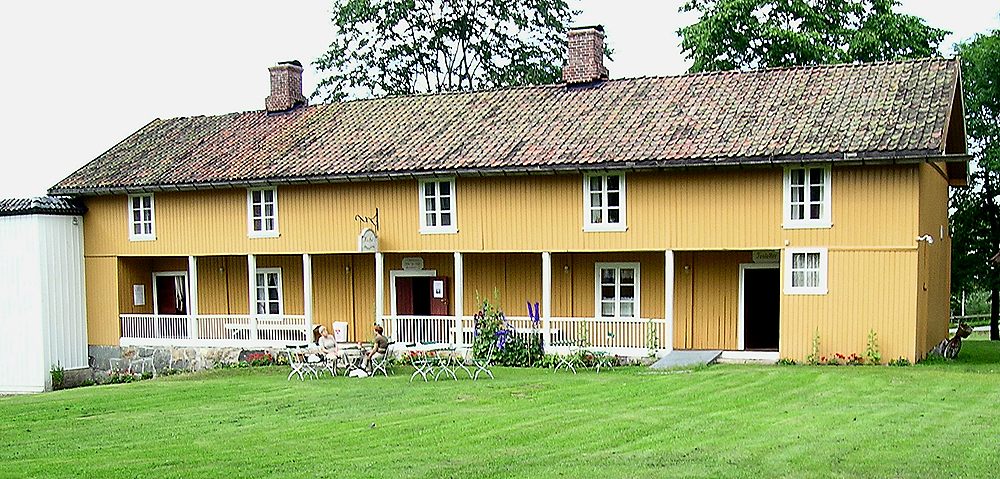
Fossesholm Manor north wing

Between 1541 and 1548, Peder Hanssøn Litle (c. 1500 – 1551), who served as captain as the Akershus Fortress, gained control of properties located on the lower part of the Drammen waterway. The water falls were bought with a view toward operating saw mills and establishing a lumber trade on a large scale. The estate remained within the Litle family until 1616 when Gunde Lange (1570–1645) acquired it and changed the name of the farm to Fossesholm Herregård around 1630.

In 1763, Jørgen von Cappelen (1715–1785) acquired Fossesholm. He expanded the estate and developed a magnificent set of buildings in rococo style inspired by great European manor houses. The Swedish painter Eric Gustav Tunmarck (1729–1789) decorated many of the interior walls with scenes from the farm environment.

The good times for the Norwegian lumber trade came to an abrupt halt when Norway entered into war (1807–1814) which affected the prime lumber market of Great Britain. In 1822 Fossesholm Manor was submitted for auction.

Amund Pedersen Fossesholm (1830–1930), who was the owner of the manor until his death, started a number of local business, including a brewery, sawmill and mill and Vestfossen Træmasse factory (Vestfossen Træmassefabrik). Fossesholm Manor including 22 acres of land was acquired in 1973 by Stiftelsen Fossesholm Herregård.

== Notable residents ==
- Trond Berg Eriksen - Professor and historian
- Kjell Hovda - Former Norwegian biathlete
- Per Olaf Lundteigen - Politician for the Centre Party
- Arne Nævra - Nature photographer
- Kjellaug Nordsjö - Icon painter
- Olaf Olsen - Drummer
- Tove Paule - Norwegian sports official
- Sigurd Simensen - Mayor
- Dagfinn Stenseth - Ambassador and author

== Gallery ==
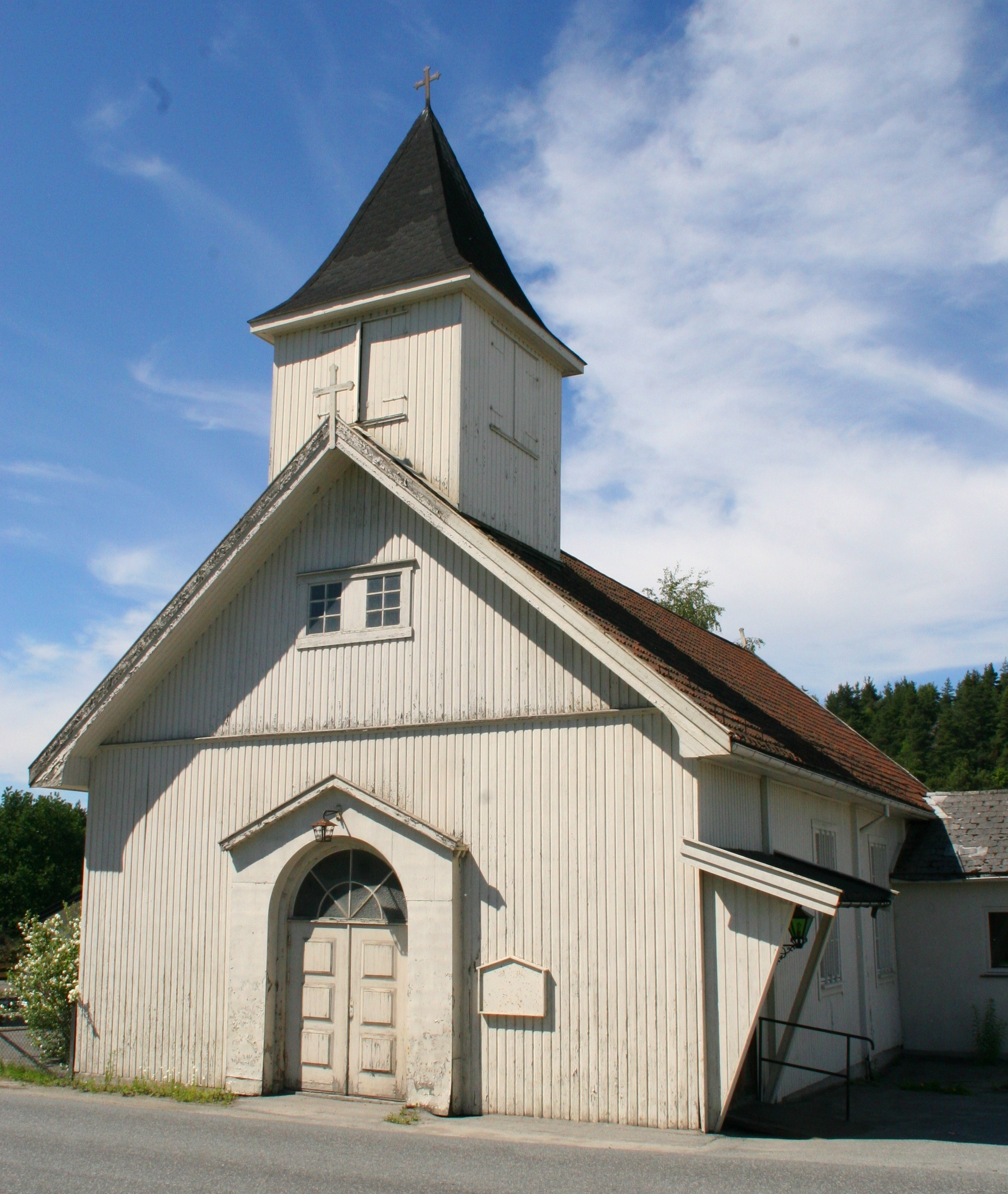
Vestfossen chapel

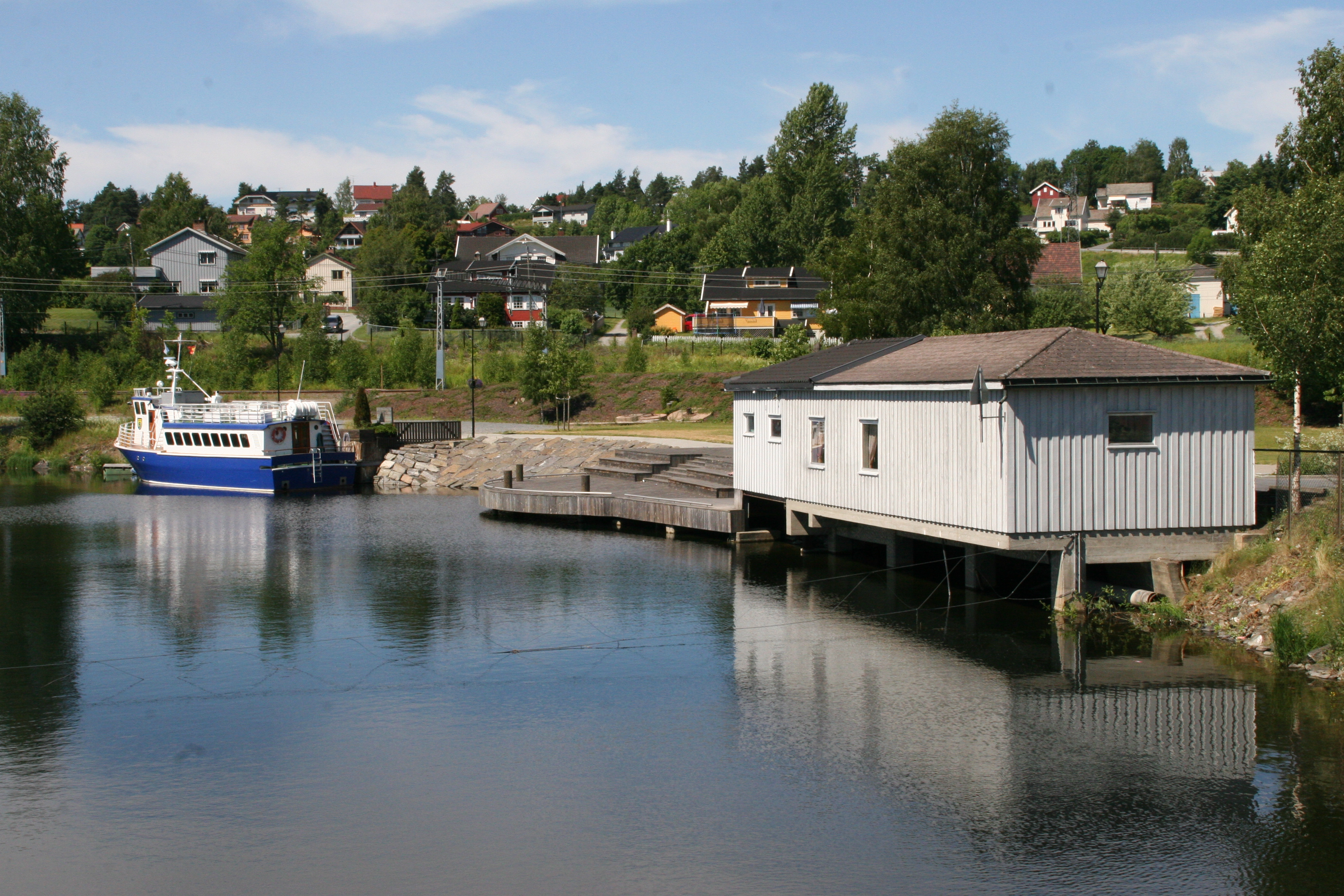
Vestfosselva River

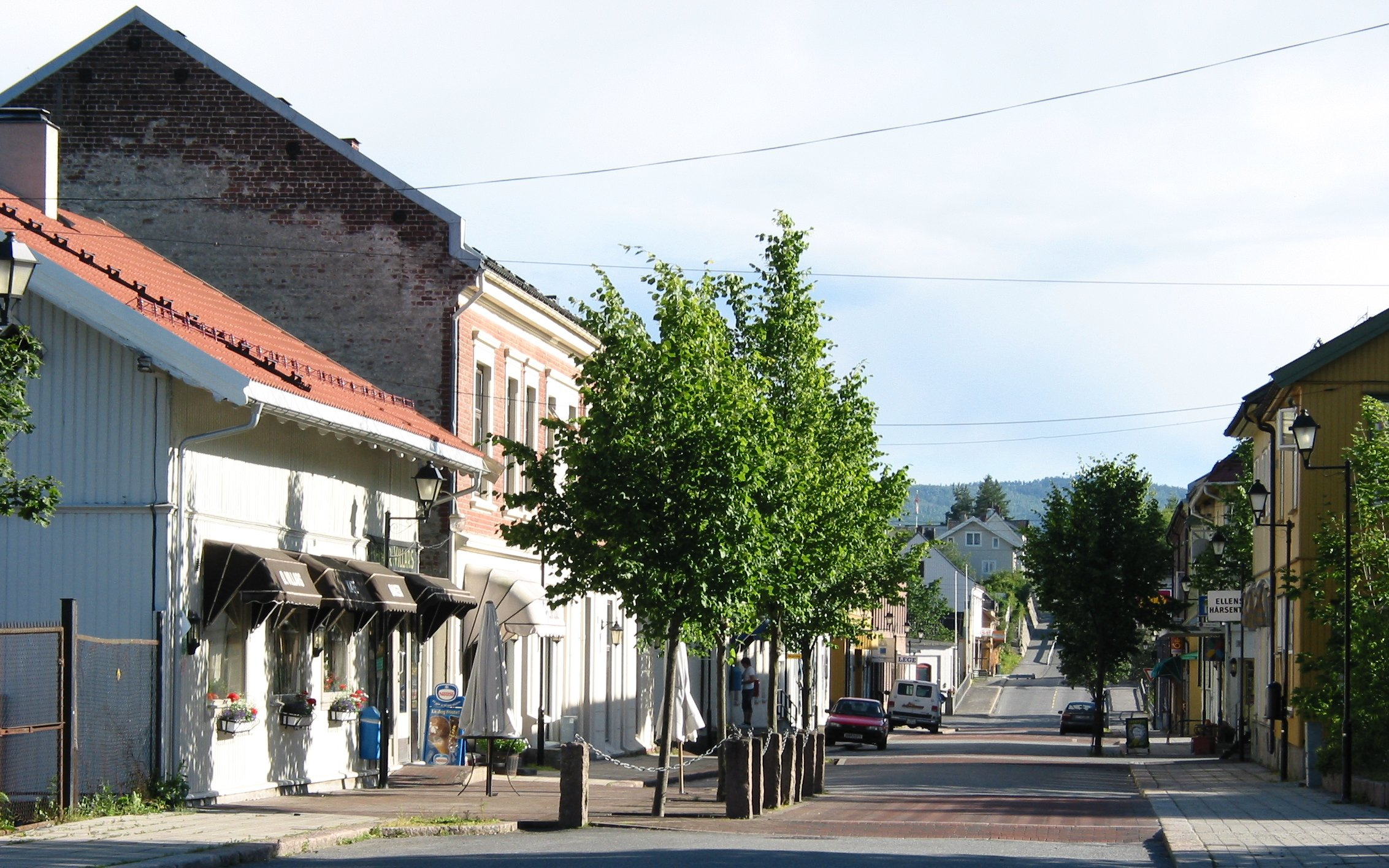
View of Storgata

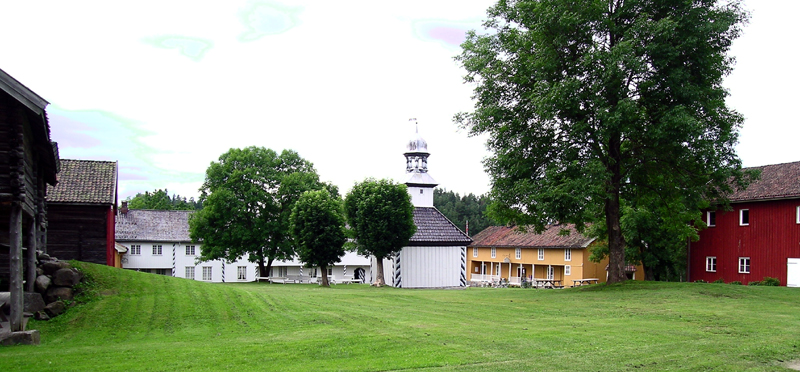
Borggården

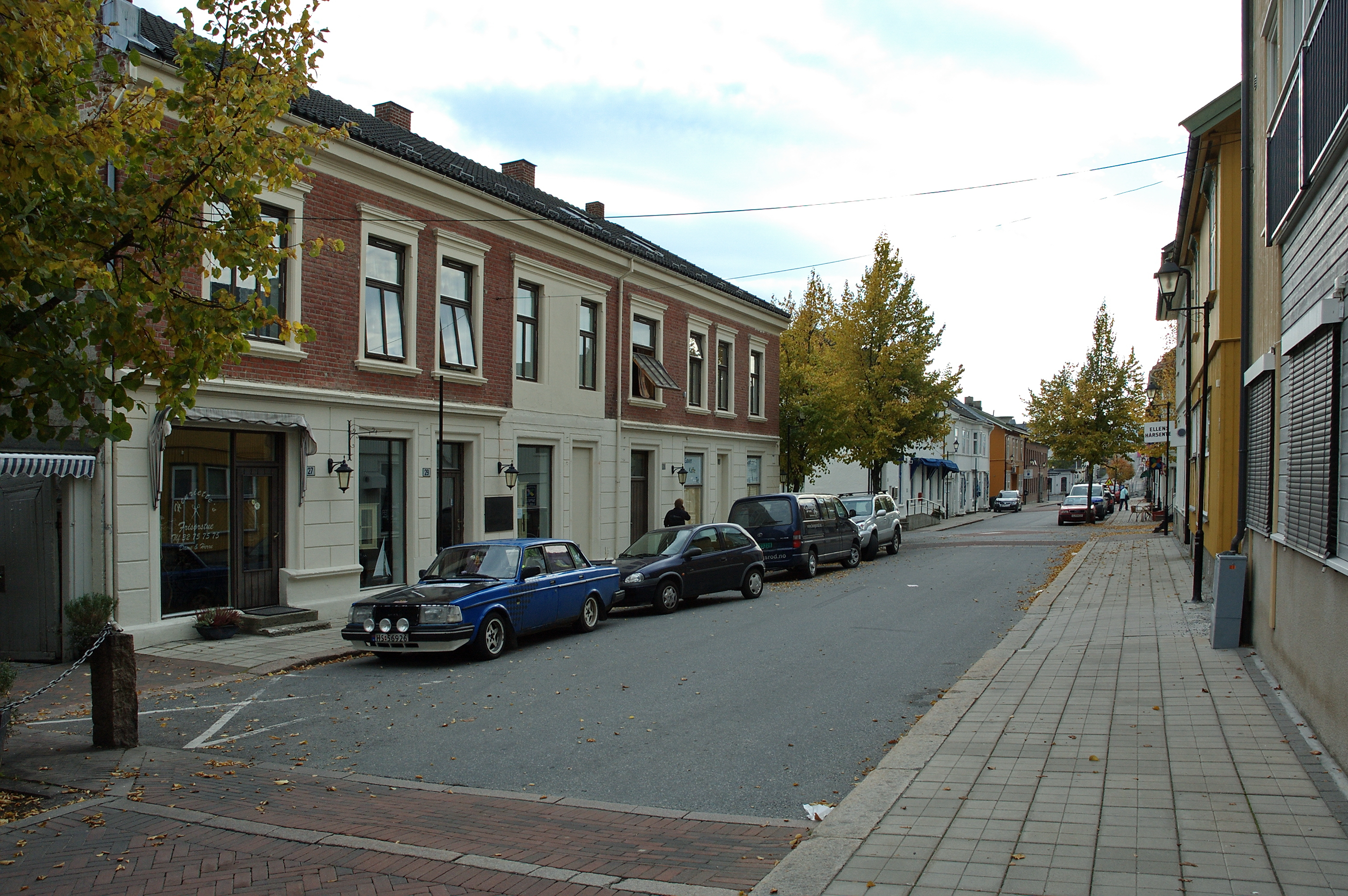
Storgata

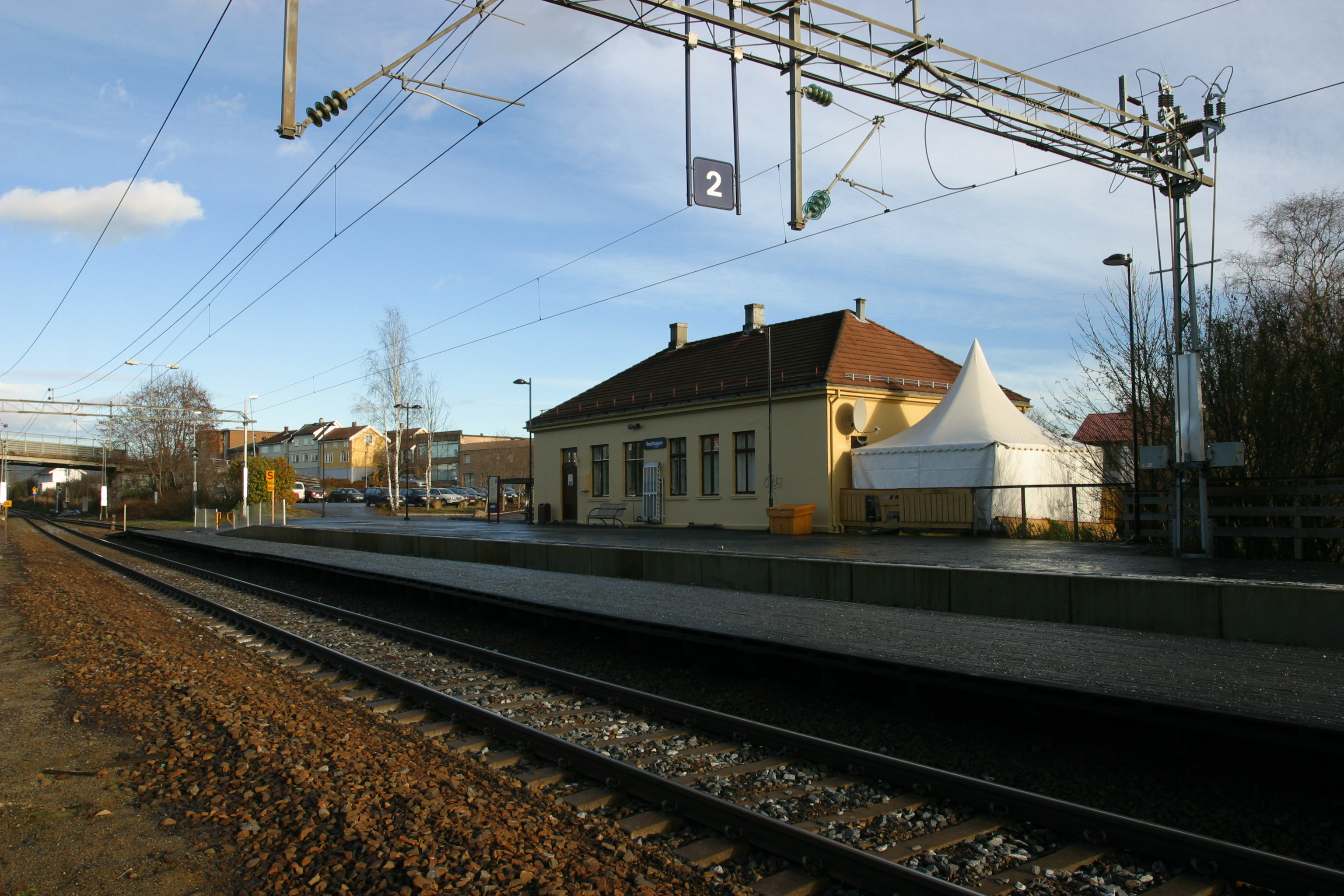
Vestfossen Train Station

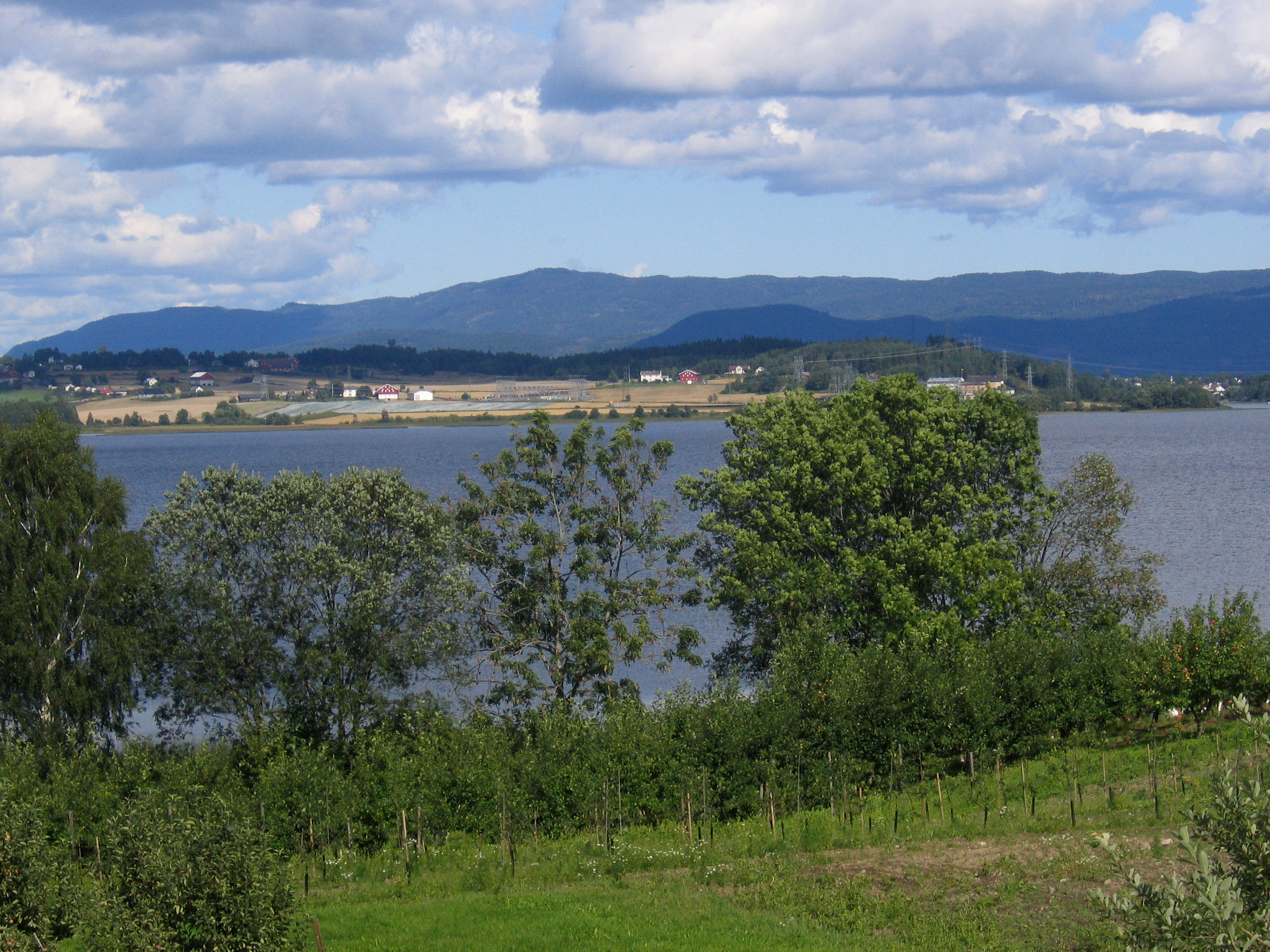
Lake Fiskumvannet

== Other sources ==
- Bent Ek (2005) Elektrisiteten på Øvre Eiker (Øvre Eiker Energi) ISBN 82-303-0583-8
- Øystein Kock Johansen; Bjarnar Moseng (1994) Eikers historie (Øvre Eiker kommune) ISBN 82-993165-0-2
- Øystein Rian (1995) Aschehougs Norgeshistorie, Bd. 5 (Oslo: Aschehoug) ISBN 82-03-22018-5
- Tom Schandy (2016) Øvre Eiker (Forlaget Tom & Tom) ISBN 9788292916216
