= Labro Træsliberi A/S =

Norwegian wood pulp company

- Formerly: Labro Tremasse
- Type: Aksjeselskap
- Industry: Wood pulp
- Founded: 1872
- Defunct: 1917
- Fate: Closed in favor of power production
- Headquarters: Skollenborg, Kongsberg, Buskerud, Norway
- Products: Wood pulp

Labro Træsliberi A/S was a wood-processing factory that produced wood pulp at Skollenborg in Kongsberg, Buskerud. The factory was founded in 1872 and closed in 1917.

== Establishment ==
Labro Træsliberi A/S at Skollenborg near Kongsberg was built in 1872 by a partnership consisting of the supreme court barrister Jacob Thurmann Ihlen (1833–1903) and the wholesalers H. H. Heitmann and Jacob Lauritz Sundt (1828–1889). The machinery was supplied by the Kongsberg brothers Jens Jacob Jensen and Andreas Jensen (1821–1873), who together with Knud Dahl of Gudbrandsdalen ran Myrens Verksted by the Akerselva just outside Christiania. A lieutenant named Steenstrup is said to have led the work of building the factory, probably Peter Steenstrup (born 1845), a mechanical engineer and electrical technician who later taught construction and machine drawing at the Naval Academy; when the construction work was finished, he became factory manager.

Those who were to work at the factory also needed places to live, and to solve this the investors behind the project bought three old ironworks houses at Kongsberg, which were dismantled and re-erected at Labro.

Ihlen, Heitmann, and Sundt invested heavily. From the start the company had three turbines and six grinding machines, and with this machinery Labro Træsliberi quickly reached an annual production of 4,000 tonnes. According to the university librarian Haakon Mathias Fiskaa (born 1894), this was a capacity no other mill could match at the time.

Other sources suggest, however, that the mill at Labro had a difficult start in both technical and financial terms. The gears that transferred power from the turbine shaft to the grindstone spindles were repeatedly damaged, which caused frequent interruptions in operation, a problem that became the subject of a long legal dispute between the mill's owners and Myrens Verksted. As operations began to stabilize toward the end of the 1870s, prices for cross-ground wood pulp fell. After a study trip to Switzerland, the factory manager Steenstrup advised the owners to invest in grinding machines where the billet was ground lengthwise along the fiber. Prices for lengthwise-ground pulp were higher than for the short-ground kind, but both raw-material consumption and operating costs grew, and in business terms the switch to lengthwise grinding was a fiasco; the owners responded by dismissing the factory manager.

== Improvements and expansions ==
In 1884 August Wahlstrøm (1849–1931), who had worked at the engineering office at Myrens Verksted, was hired as his successor. Under his leadership several of the technical problems that had marked the business were corrected. This created new optimism, and Wahlstrøm could launch expansion plans to make better use of the energy in the waterfall and increase capacity considerably. The intake dam for the turbine water was extended, and a new brick mill building was raised below the old one. This mill, called "Norge," was put into operation in 1887. The next year the board decided to continue building by adding a further mill, "Sverige," next to the previous one. Shortly after production began there, the drying house burned down and was replaced by a new boiler house with a modern drying plant. After these rebuildings and expansions, Labro Træsliberi could produce up to 10,000–11,000 tonnes of wood pulp a year. In the first half of the 1880s, when the number of mills in Buskerud rose from seven to fifteen, Labro, with its 72 employees, was still among the largest wood-processing companies in the county.

After the expansions of the 1880s, Labro Træsliberi had an annual timber consumption of 6,000–7,000 dozen logs, bought from forests farther up Numedal. All the floated timber was gathered in a boom above the waterfall, where timber for the mill was separated from that bound for sawmills and wood-processing companies farther down the watercourse. The factory built a timber chute more than 400 meters long to get this timber past the waterfall undamaged, and the timber buyers along the lower part of the watercourse paid a quantity fee to have their timber sent through it. Taking timber from the Lågen up to the mill at Labro was difficult, as the water level outside the factory varied greatly with the seasons and weather. This was considerably eased when Wahlstrøm managed to build an electrically driven log-handling machine powered by a five-horsepower dynamo from a barge on the river.

For many years the transport of wood pulp from the mill to Skollenborg railway station was done with 18–20 horses the company owned; in 1902 the horses were replaced by a cableway. Labro Træsliberi is said to have built a small power plant at Labrofossen early on, its purpose not to supply energy for the grinding machines and other equipment but to provide electric light in the production rooms.

== Demand for power from Labrofossen ==
In the years just after 1900, many local communities began to take an interest in the potential for hydroelectric power production at many of the waterfalls that had served as locations for wood-processing companies. Labro was favorably placed with regard to electricity supply for the population centers of Buskerud.

In 1911 the waterfall rights and the company were sold to Drammens Elektricitetsverk, which immediately built a power plant to draw 3,000 turbine horsepower from Labrofossen's 40-meter fall. This did not lead to an immediate halt in pulp production, however, as the factory's owners reserved the right to continue leasing the mill and agreed to use 2,400 horsepower from the power plant for continued pulp production until 1935.

Although from 1911 the business operated in leased premises and partly with paid energy, an investment was made in 1914 to convert from cold to hot grinding. The background for this was that the powerful English group Edward Lloyd Ltd. had contracted to buy 20,000 tonnes of wood pulp from Labro each year until 1936. The old grinding machines were replaced by four new ones. The conversion improved efficiency enough that the management reduced staff from 44 to 37 and set new piece rates for the remaining workers. This brought the company, represented by the Norwegian Employers' Association, into a legally significant arbitration case against Labro Fagforening, a union founded in 1907.

Already when Labro Træsliberi was rebuilt for hot grinding, Drammen municipality was pressing to buy out the mill's lease on the factory so its electricity works could use the entire water flow in Labrofossen. Such offers were tempting to the management, because the rising prices of timber and wood pulp made the company's long-term supply agreement with Edward Lloyd Ltd. unfavorable. The English company, however, was not interested in giving up its contracted prices and deliveries.

In 1917 the mill's owners negotiated a sale to Union Co. This company had considerable forest properties in Numedal, and it was generally assumed that Union was interested in the Labro mill in order to process the timber from these forests at its own plant more easily. This proved to be a misjudgment. After Union had taken over the share majority, negotiations continued with both Edward Lloyd Ltd. and Drammen municipality, ending with Drammens Elektricitetsverk paying close to half a million kroner to release Labro Træsliberi A/S from its contract with Edward Lloyd Ltd. The power developers also paid a considerable sum to have the power-lease contract with the Union-owned mill cancelled. Pulp production at Labro was thus stopped, and the power development at the waterfall could continue. The factory's machinery was sold to Union, which was left with a tidy profit from the transactions; the taxation of this surplus became the origin of a dispute between Union and the tax authorities, which the company won after a supreme court ruling in 1925.

In 1918 a new Union-owned firm called A/S Labro Træsliberi was registered with the company register in Christiania, but it soon reported that it had changed its name to A/S Labroskogene, indicating that the purpose was to continue managing the forests the mill had bought. Labroskogene was managed by a forestry graduate, who also looked after Union's interests in Numedalske Skogaktieselskap and Kongsberg Dampsag. The closure of Labro Træsliberi created great economic problems both for Øvre Sandsvær municipality and for the mill workers' families, who lost their livelihood in a period of high unemployment.

== Labro Museum ==
The power station at Labro was in operation until 1994, after which the plant was transferred to Lågdalsmuseet, which wanted to use it to present the watercourse history of the Numedalslågen. Central to this is the power station, designed by the architect Herman Major Backer in 1910 and built by Drammens Elektricitetsverk. The site also includes some buildings from the mill era at Labro, among them the mill master's house and a workers' residence.

Three dwellings were moved to Drammen after the mill closed; two were re-erected in Kiøsteruds gate and the third, the machine master's house, in Wildthagens vei. At Labro there are still a stable, a carpentry workshop, a smithy, and a workers' hall from the mill's time. Lågdalsmuseet also maintains an 1,800-meter timber chute built in the 19th century to carry timber past Labrofossen and the mill that stood there. The mill buildings at Labro are gone.

== Bibliography ==
- Fiskaa, Haakon Mathias (1951). «Treforedlingsindustrien i Buskerud fylke», in Det norske næringsliv, Buskerud fylkesleksikon, p. 148.
- Friis, Nils (1998). «Labro. Et kulturelt kraftsentrum», in Fortidsvern no. 4, 1998, pp. 28–30.
- Melby, Bjarne August (1949). August Wahlstrøm. En treslipers liv og virke. Oslo, especially pp. 46–66.
