= Klässbol =

- Location within Sweden
- Coordinates: 59°32′N 12°44′E
- Country: Sweden
- Province: Värmland
- County: Värmland County
- Municipality: Arvika Municipality

Area
  - Total: 0.58 km^{2} (0.22 sq mi)

Population (31 December 2010)
  - Total: 293
  - Density: 502/km^{2} (1,300/sq mi)
- Time zone: UTC+1 (CET)
  - Summer (DST): UTC+2 (CEST)

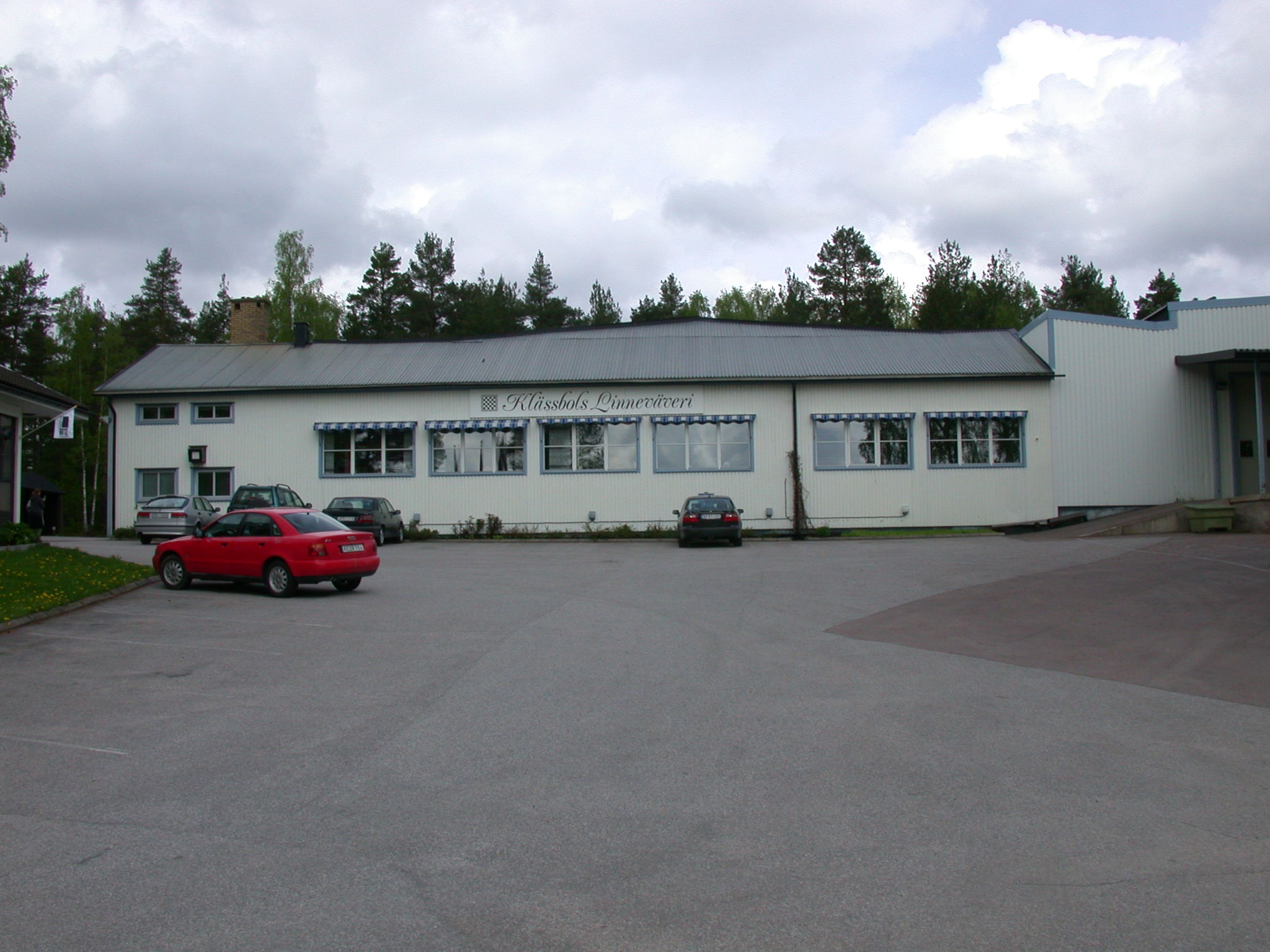
Klässbol textile mill

Klässbol is a locality situated in Arvika Municipality, Värmland County, Sweden with 293 inhabitants in 2010.
