= Edane =

- Location within Sweden
- Coordinates: 59°38′N 12°48′E
- Country: Sweden
- Province: Värmland
- County: Värmland County
- Municipality: Arvika Municipality

Area
  - Total: 1.76 km^{2} (0.68 sq mi)

Population (31 December 2010)
  - Total: 706
  - Density: 401/km^{2} (1,040/sq mi)
- Time zone: UTC+1 (CET)
  - Summer (DST): UTC+2 (CEST)

Edane (Swedish pronunciation: [ˈêːdanɛ]) is a locality situated in Arvika Municipality, Värmland County, Sweden with 706 inhabitants in 2010.
