= Sulvik =

- Location within Sweden
- Coordinates: 59°41′N 12°24′E
- Country: Sweden
- Province: Värmland
- County: Värmland County
- Municipality: Arvika Municipality

Area
  - Total: 0.80 km^{2} (0.31 sq mi)

Population (31 December 2010)
  - Total: 312
  - Density: 390/km^{2} (1,000/sq mi)
- Time zone: UTC+1 (CET)
  - Summer (DST): UTC+2 (CEST)

Sulvik is a locality situated in Arvika Municipality, Värmland County, Sweden with 312 inhabitants in 2010.
