= Åmotfors =

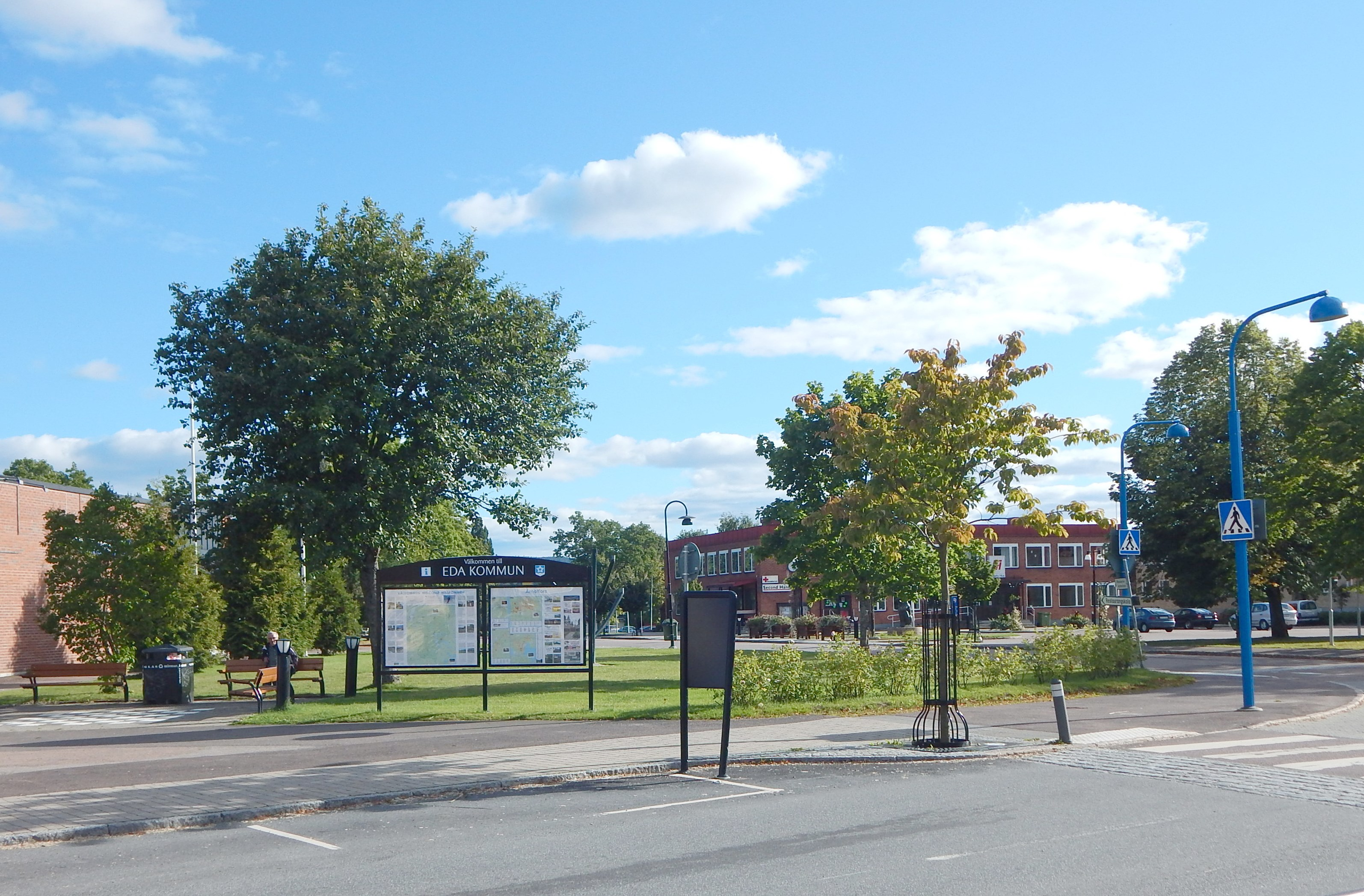

- Location within Sweden
- Coordinates: 59°46′N 12°22′E
- Country: Sweden
- Province: Värmland
- County: Värmland County
- Municipality: Eda Municipality and Arvika Municipality

Area
  - Total: 2.60 km^{2} (1.00 sq mi)

Population (31 December 2010)
  - Total: 1,410
  - Density: 542/km^{2} (1,400/sq mi)
- Time zone: UTC+1 (CET)
  - Summer (DST): UTC+2 (CEST)

Åmotfors is a bimunicipal locality situated in Eda Municipality and Arvika Municipality, Värmland County, Sweden with 1,410 inhabitants in 2010.
