= Jössefors =

- Location within Sweden
- Coordinates: 59°41′N 12°28′E
- Country: Sweden
- Province: Värmland
- County: Värmland County
- Municipality: Arvika Municipality

Area
  - Total: 1.48 km^{2} (0.57 sq mi)

Population (31 December 2010)
  - Total: 732
  - Density: 494/km^{2} (1,280/sq mi)
- Time zone: UTC+1 (CET)
  - Summer (DST): UTC+2 (CEST)

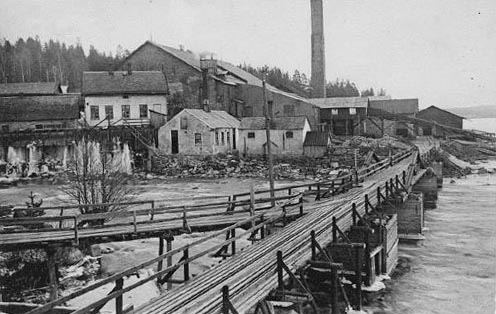
Jössefors bridge

Jössefors is a locality situated in Arvika Municipality, Värmland County, Sweden with 732 inhabitants in 2010.
