= Menstad conflict =

1931 Norwegian policing incident

The Menstad conflict (Norwegian: Menstadkonflikten) or Menstad battle (Norwegian: Menstadslaget) was a policing incident and political debacle which occurred on June 8, 1931 at Norsk Hydro's Menstad plant, near Skien in Telemark county, Norway.

Norway had been experiencing significant industrial tensions since March due to the effects of the Great Depression. It was in this atmosphere that the Norwegian Employers' Confederation (NAF) announced a pay cut of 15 and 20 percent. When the Workers' National Trade Union rejected this suggestion and counter-proposed a reduction of working hours, the NAF responded with a program of lockouts. During the lockouts, two companies, Norsk Hydro and Norske Skog Union, chose to allow some contract workers to perform some work. This was perceived as strikebreaking, escalating tensions.

The secretary of the Labor Party at the time, Einar Gerhardsen, referred to the strikebreakers as "scabs" (Norwegian: skabbdyr), and the director of Norsk Hydro, Bjarne Eriksen, described the dispute as being one between Labor and the community. In the afternoon of June 8, 2,000 workers marched to the Norsk Hydro trans-shipment port and warehouse at Menstad, where 100 police officers guarded the contract workers. The police were overwhelmed by the striking workers, who threw stones and iron piping before retreating. The government response (passed on by the Minister of Defense, Vidkun Quisling) was to send the Norwegian Armed Forces to Telemark with the stated aim of protecting nearby weapons depots. Although there was no further incident, and law and order in the area was duly restored, the government response was heavily criticized by the Communist Party, who had led the original demonstrations.

== See also ==
- Ådalen shootings
