= Norske Skog Union =

Former pulp and paper company in Norway

Union

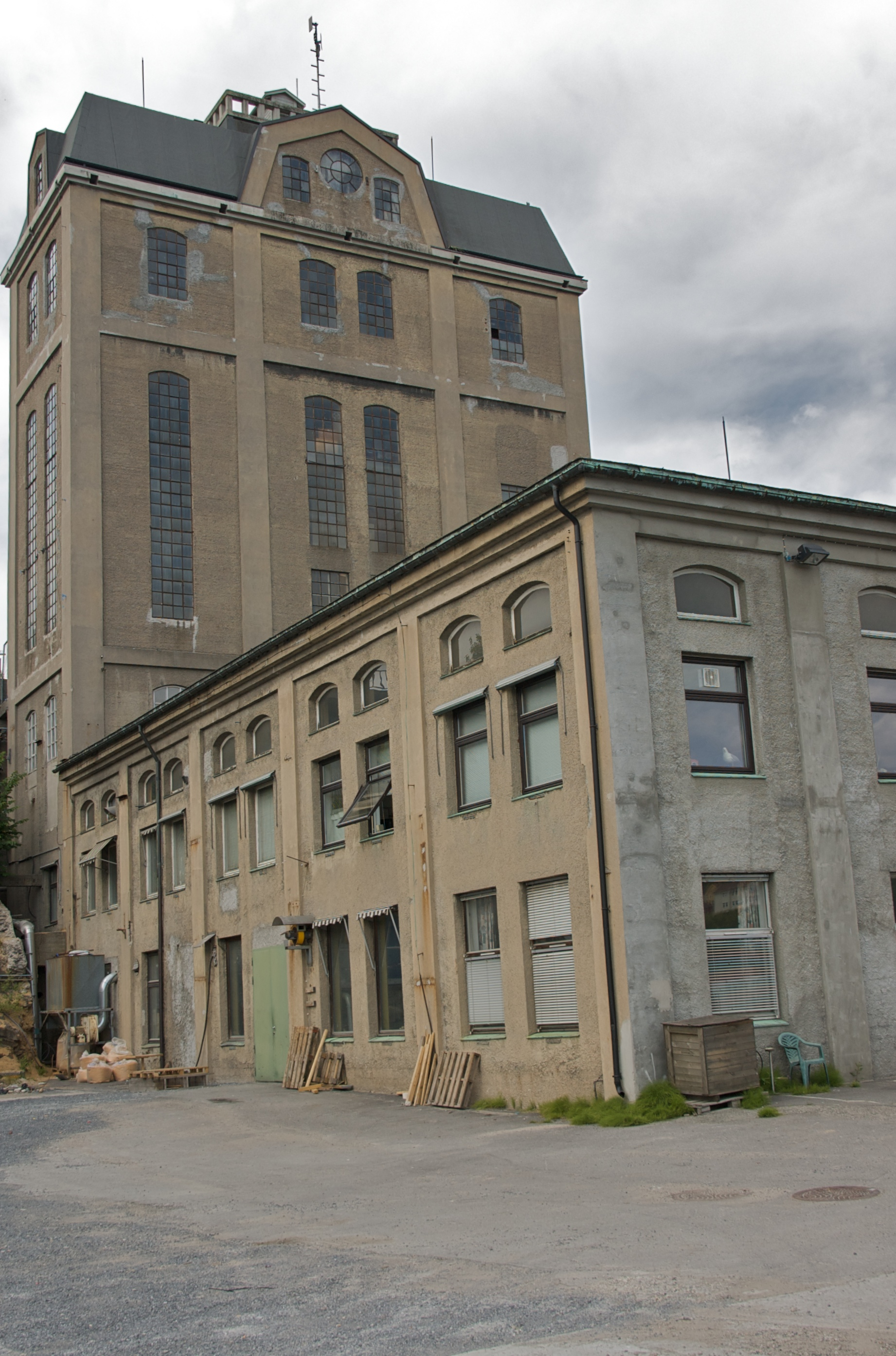
- Formerly: Skiens Træsliberi; Union Bruk; Union Co.; Norske Skog Union
- Type: Pulp and paper
- Industry: Pulp and paper
- Founded: 1873
- Defunct: 2006
- Fate: Closed
- Headquarters: Skien, Norway
- Products: Wood pulp, cellulose, newsprint, book paper
- Number of employees: 385 (2006)

Union was one of Norway's largest wood-processing companies, producing wood pulp, cellulose, and paper. It was founded in 1873 in Skien, at Damfoss on the Skien River, by the Norwegian-British engineer Benjamin Sewell and the Norwegian Halvor Emil Heyerdahl. The company originally comprised a wood-grinding mill and a paper factory, and later a sulfite cellulose factory as well.

The main goal was for Union to become an integrated wood-processing company with pulp, cellulose, and paper production, covering the whole production chain from processed timber to paper. Union was also active in power development and held ownership interests in several other companies. Around 1900 it accounted for more than a third of Norwegian paper exports, and through its investment in Skien and its acquisition of other companies, it had developed into Norway's largest wood-processing group by the First World War.

The interwar crises were difficult for Union, but after the Second World War the company entered a 25-year period of strong growth, running a considerable operating surplus between 1946 and 1971, with a peak year in 1970. Harder times followed. In 1999 Union was taken over by Norske Skogindustrier, which had been the principal shareholder since 1985. Norske Skog Union was the fourth-largest paper producer in Norway, producing mainly newsprint and paper for paperback books.

The factory was closed in 2006 after large protests from the local community and trade unions, among others.

== History ==
Sewell and Heyerdahl had met in Hannover, Germany, where both had trained as engineers. Wishing to take advantage of the boom in wood processing in the 1860s and 1870s, in 1873 they bought a wood-grinding mill, Skiens Træsliberi on Smedøya, with its waterfall rights and land around Damfoss, and a month later a nearby sawmill with land, buildings, and waterfall. A share invitation was then issued, taken up by twelve men from Skien, Christiania, Zwickau, London, and Linderud, who contributed 65,000 speciedaler in all. Among the participants were Sewell's father Thomas Sewell (1815–1892), a wholesaler in Christiania, the engineer H. I. Brooke, the chamberlain Herman Leopold Løvenskiold (1859–1922), and the landowner H. C. Mathiesen.

In May 1873 the joint-stock company Union held its first general meeting in Thorvald Meyer's offices in Christiania. The founders set ambitious plans for an integrated pulp and paper factory on Smedøya under the name Union Bruk; for a time Borregaard in Sarpsborg was also considered as a site. Sewell became managing director, while Heyerdahl withdrew early. Union's first chairman was the later prime minister Christian Schweigaard, but Mathiesen took over the chairmanship as early as 1875.

=== Operations ===
Union started in 1873 with a limited plant but began developing almost immediately, with Sewell himself drawing the working plans for the factory. Union Bruk held waterfall rights to 1,600 horsepower, equal to 20 percent of the combined power of the Skien falls. The old mill consisted of two smaller grindstones but was expanded with three more after the takeover. Work on the paper factory also began, and a paper machine 72 inches wide was ordered from A. Chautrenne in Belgium. Most of the timber was bought through the firm Blakstad, Holta & Co. A/S in Skien.

The factory exported two cargoes of wood pulp to England as early as July 1873. A new paper machine was delivered the following year, giving the mill a capacity of 400 tonnes of wet pulp a month, but the machine caused problems; additional equipment and damage meant it took several years to get properly running. The factory struggled with deficits and a declining pulp market, and an operating loss of 326,588 speciedaler in the first year, the troublesome paper machine, and the pulp-market slump from 1875 marked Union's first years.

With guarantees from the engineer Brooke and the landowner Mathiesen, operations resumed in 1876, and production was converted from brown wood paper to printing paper. In 1878 Union supplied paper to Norwegian newspapers for the first time, the first deliveries going to the local papers in Skien and later to large papers such as Aftenposten and Morgenbladet in Christiania.

=== After the 1881 fire ===
Union burned down in 1881, but the disaster was not a catastrophe for the well-insured company, whose compensation came to just over 500,000. With the insurance money Union could build a more modern and efficient factory, and the wood-grinding mill was quickly rebuilt. Because of the poor experience of Union's early years, Sewell did not rebuild the paper factory but began planning a cellulose factory, having earlier been central to building the country's first sulfite cellulose plant for Skien Cellulosefabrik. The new sulfite cellulose factory was ready for operation in 1887, with two boilers, joined by a third in 1891. The plant's large dimensions attracted attention, and production was about 6,000 tonnes of dry sulfite cellulose a year; the good economics of this plant laid the basis for Union's growth. Paper production was not resumed until 1898, and then at first to produce packaging for the company's own needs.

=== Løveid and Skotfoss factories ===
Even more important for the company's development was the merger with Løveid Fabrikker in 1891, a company Sewell and others had formed to build a large paper factory at Skotfoss. In 1890 W. Drewsen, owner of Bentse Brug, sold Skotfos Træsliberi to Sewell, Jørgen Heftye, and Christian Christophersen, who established A/S Løveid Fabrikker as a separate joint-stock company, though the plan was always to integrate Union and Løveid Fabrikker into one company.

Skotfoss Bruk had a sawmill, wood-grinding mill, paper factory, and power plant. The factory was built for six paper machines, making it one of the largest in Europe. In 1905, 30,000 tonnes of paper were produced at Skotfoss, while Union Bruk produced only about 4,000 tonnes on its single paper machine; Skotfoss had 24 grinding machines for pulp production, Skien only four. Union Bruk was at this time mainly a cellulose factory, supplying most of its production to Skotfoss for paper-making there. Around the turn of the century Union Bruk employed about 250 workers, Skotfos Bruk nearly 900. In 1902 the company allocated money for the Møsvann dam, and when the work stopped three years later, took responsibility for completing it; it later helped raise the canal at Hjellevannet, finished in 1913.

=== Union becomes a corporation ===
In 1893 Gustav Carl Fangel Smidth (1853–1921) was appointed managing director after Sewell had to step down because of failing health. A Danish paper manufacturer, Fangel Smidth was central in shaping the company's strategy to grow into a large corporation. Together with Union's chairman, Christian Christophersen, who ran the country's largest firm for the sale of wood pulp and cellulose, he built up an effective sales organization, Union Paper Agency Ltd., focused mainly on the British market. In 1903 the company exported 16,300 tonnes of paper to Britain. Union accounted for about 35 percent of Norway's paper exports at this time and, because of its quality, as much as 50 percent of the export value. Toward the First World War the company took on the sale of paper for a number of Norwegian wood-processing companies, equal to 60 percent of the country's paper exports.

=== Large-scale operation and raw materials ===
Union wished to expand into an industrial group to enjoy economies of scale, as paper prices had fallen and rationalization and larger-quantity production had become necessary. Between 1900 and 1917 the company bought up nearly all the wood-processing companies in the Skien area and a number in the Drammen and Lågen watercourses. In 1906 Union's board helped establish the joint-stock company Klosterfossen, to build a paper factory on Klosterøya in Skien, and soon took over its share majority. In 1916 Skiens Papirfabrik and the old mills N. Kittilsen, Laugstol Bruk, and Grubbe Bruk were acquired, and soon Skien Cellulosefabrik at Vadrette as well.

In the Drammen and Lågen watercourses Union took over Embretsfos Fabrikker, Skotselv Cellulosefabrik, Drammenselvens Papirfabrikker, Forenede Papirfabriker, Holmens Bruk, and Labro Træsliberi. In 1918 Union also acquired the share majority in A/S Klevfos Cellulose- & Papirfabrik at Ådalsbruk, expanding into the Glomma district.

The acquisitions also secured Union's access to raw materials, as timber was becoming a scarce resource. Union had sought timber outside its own district early on, and before the First World War it waged an outright timber war with Borregaard in Sarpsborg. Concession laws from the start of the century forbade owning forest outside one's own district, and Union had not prioritized forest purchases. This changed with the takeover of companies in the Drammen watercourse: A/S Embretsfos owned 46,500 mål of forest when Union took it over, with a further 8,700 mål from Skotselv Cellulosefabrik and 1,000 mål from Drammenselvens Papirfabrikker. Buying forest property now became Union's own policy, especially after Nils Olav Young Fearnley (1881–1961) became manager in 1912. Union acquired Numedalske Skogaktieselskap with 36,000 mål in 1916, and A/S Labroskogene with 30,000 mål a little later. By 1922 Union Co. owned, directly and through subsidiaries, 120,885 mål of forest, though most of its raw material still had to be bought.

=== Crisis and conflict ===
Union's growth before and during the First World War stood in sharp contrast to the problems of the 1920s, 1930s, and 1940s, and the interwar crisis was worse for Union than for most other companies in the industry. The group paid dearly for speculation in Russian forests and the paper industry in Brazil. The industry generally saw prices for wood-processing products fall dramatically, with high interest rates and harder foreign competition; in 1921 prices for pulp, cellulose, and paper fell to 1905 levels. Economic crises and labor disputes in the form of strikes and lockouts made matters worse, in a time of mass unemployment and depression. Norwegian companies could not afford to modernize their factories while costs had risen considerably, not least because of the reduced eight-hour day, holidays, and higher wages, and large modern paper factories in the United States and Canada sharpened international competition.

In 1921 Union had to undertake debt restructuring, as it did again in 1934 and immediately after the Second World War. The 1921 refinancing made Centralbanken for Norge the main creditor and largest shareholder, and a similar process in 1934 refinanced Union with foreign capital, including a loan from Hambros Bank in London. During a lockout in 1931, Union had work carried out by contract workers without a collective agreement, which the labor movement and striking workers regarded as employer-backed strikebreaking; this led to demonstrations from 30 May 1931 in which demonstrators tried to drive off the contract workers, culminating in the Battle of Menstad.

=== Modernization ===
In 1930 Union Co. had still been the largest paper producer in the Nordic countries but was passed in the following years by Swedish and Finnish competitors. To stay competitive, Union began work in 1935 on a complete modernization of its factories in Skien and elsewhere. The modernization was financed by loans, and when problems returned during the Second World War, Union again faced full economic crisis. Production stopped entirely as export markets were closed to Norwegian industry, and Union met the peace in 1945 with disastrous finances; a new refinancing was the only way to avoid liquidation.

In this process efforts were made for Norwegian interests to take over the company, and the Norwegian state eventually took over British shares and other assets. A dispute over this takeover led to a long conflict between the state and Union that went all the way to the Supreme Court and was not settled until 1960, with Union the major loser.

=== From cellulose to paper ===
The postwar period was one of large investment for the Union group and increasing concentration of activity in Skien. After the 1930s modernization, Union Bruk could produce about 21,000 tonnes of dry sulfite cellulose a year, against about 17,000 tonnes in the 1920s, with pulp production of about 4,000 tonnes (50 percent wet) and about 6,000 tonnes of wrapping paper. In practice it was no longer possible to separate Union from the two neighboring companies Klosterfossen and Skiens Papirfabrik; joint facilities had been built with Union Bruk already during Klosterfossen's establishment, and after Skiens Papirfabrik joined the Union group its operation was coordinated with the others. From 1935 a process of full operational and administrative integration began, and the three former companies were to be designated by the same name, "Union Bruk, Skien."

Despite the complex's large size, Union Bruk's capacity in the 1950s was relatively small by international standards. An extensive modernization plan called for a new paper factory and wood-grinding mill, producing newsprint on one large paper machine in a new building by the sea next to the old Klosterfossen building on Klosterøya, while the two paper machines that had produced newsprint there were converted to make wrapping paper and board for Union's packaging needs and the machines at the former Skiens Papirfabrik were taken out of use. The plan was realized in 1958. The new machine (PM6) was the country's largest, with a working width of 5.08 meters and a top speed of 750 meters per minute and an annual capacity of about 70,000 tonnes of paper, while the new wood-grinding mill had a capacity of 40,000 tonnes a year; the cellulose factory was rebuilt so it could also cook cellulose from pine.

An extensive expansion was carried out in 1975–1979 to nearly triple newsprint production. A new paper machine (PM7) was put into operation with a capacity of 400 tonnes of paper a day and a speed of 1,200 meters per minute, and pulp production was expanded from 75 to 200 tonnes a day. A new cellulose factory was built with an annual capacity of 65,000 tonnes of dry sulfite cellulose, concentrating all cellulose production in Skien after the Skotselv factory closed. The modernization cost 700 million kroner, 300 million more than calculated, while operations in the following years ran at considerable losses, partly because of start-up problems and a declining paper market. The group struggled to service its loans, and by 1981 the company was technically bankrupt.

=== Consolidation ===
The 1970s expansion made operations at Union Bruk more efficient, so that in time the company could hold its own in a market of steadily falling paper prices. The smaller factories had been closed one by one, some as part of structural rationalization in the industry and in agreement with the authorities; 16 companies were closed in the early 1970s, and the wave continued into the 1980s. Skotfos Bruk, long the company's gold mine, was closed in 1986. Union continued as an independent company in an increasingly integrated paper industry, but by 1985 Norske Skog and Follum had acquired over 50 percent ownership influence.

Union was kept out of the large 1989 merger between Norske Skog, Follum, and Tofte Industrier, which came as a surprise to others in the industry and raised concern within Union about its future. The merged Norske Skog, soon joined by Saugbrugsforeningen in Halden, gained a wholly dominant position in Norwegian wood processing. The late 1980s were nonetheless good years economically for Union, which had worked its way out of its debt problems and turned to profit, and cooperation with Norske Skog continued after the merger. In 1993 the development plan UB2000 was adopted, providing for a plant to produce thermomechanical pulp (TMP) to replace pulp and cellulose in paper-making, a new bleaching plant, a biological treatment plant, and other environmental measures.

Pollution had been firmly placed on the agenda in the 1970s and became a problem for the wood-processing industry, not least the sulfite cellulose factories, with their air and water pollution. Union Bruk received many complaints and struggled with the emission-treatment requirements, but with the closure of the cellulose factory in 1996 the situation became satisfactory. The new TMP product also improved paper quality, and operations became more stable after the new investments. The 1990s were a decade of great progress and very good results, and a production record of 224,000 tonnes of newsprint was set in 1995. Most production was marketed through Norske Skog Sales and exported, but about 50,000 tonnes of paper also went to Norwegian newspapers, including Aftenposten and VG, and a number of regional and local papers.

=== From merger to closure ===
In 1999 Union Co. itself became part of the Norske Skog group. Union Bruk was to operate under the name Norske Skog Union and be developed as a pure book-paper producer, employing about 500 people at this time, down from nearly 700 in the early 1980s as rationalization reduced staff; further measures after the merger reduced the workforce again. Newsprint was produced on both paper machines, but PM6 also produced book paper, a so-called bulky wood-containing paper similar to newsprint, for paperback books. With the new bleaching plant completed in 1998 and investments of nearly 90 million kroner in PM6, increasing emphasis was placed on bleached bulky, and in time PM6 produced only book paper. In 2005 Union Bruk produced 150,000 tonnes of newsprint and 90,000 tonnes of book paper.

The factory's major problem had long been its location on an island in Skien's inner harbor. As early as the 1960s Union had discussed building a new large paper factory elsewhere with others in the industry, including Treschow-Fritzøe in Larvik, as expansion possibilities in Skien were small and the timber storage area limited. From the 1950s onward much timber was driven to the factory by truck, but to the very end between 20 and 50 percent of the annual raw material need of about 600,000 cubic meters was floated from Notodden and Gvarv through the Telemark Canal and almost straight into the factory, and much timber was also imported.

The factory's future had long been uncertain, and Norske Skog was investing increasingly outside Norway, growing into an international group with production units worldwide. In 2005 it was decided to close the Skien factory despite its operating surplus and strong protests from politicians, residents, and employees, in order to strengthen the competitiveness of the group's other Norwegian operations. Newsprint production stopped on 1 February and book-paper production on 1 March 2006, and 385 workers at Norske Skog Union lost their jobs, as did the country's last timber floaters, since the traditional floating in the Telemark watercourse depended on Union Bruk's timber needs to continue.

== Bibliography ==
- Coll, Axel Ludvigsen (1900). Skiensfjordens Industri i tekst og billeder. Kristiania.
- Grønlie, Tore (1978). «Kampen om Union». Historisk tidsskrift.
- Holand, Johan Edvard (1993). Skotfoss fram i lyset. Skotfoss historielag.
- Haakonsen, Ronald (1999). Union 125 år: 1873–1998. Skien: Union.
- Koren, Claus J. (1994). «Aktieselskabet Union og underet på Skotfos». In 11 beretninger fra skogindustriens historie. Oslo: Selvig Publ.
- Mustad, Sigbjørn (1946). Forhandlingene om overføring på norske hender av de engelske interesser i Union Co.. Oslo.
- Strømme Svendsen, Arnljot (1973). Union 1873–1973. En norsk storbedrifts liv og eksistenskamp. Oslo: H. Aschehoug & Co.
- Åbyholm, Kjell G. (1960). Kapitalbevegelser i A/S Union (Union Co.) i tiden 1910–1958. Bergen.
