= Gunnarskog =

- Location within Sweden
- Coordinates: 59°50′N 12°33′E
- Country: Sweden
- Province: Värmland
- County: Värmland County
- Municipality: Arvika Municipality

Area
  - Total: 0.81 km^{2} (0.31 sq mi)

Population (31 December 2010)
  - Total: 290
  - Density: 360/km^{2} (930/sq mi)
- Time zone: UTC+1 (CET)
  - Summer (DST): UTC+2 (CEST)

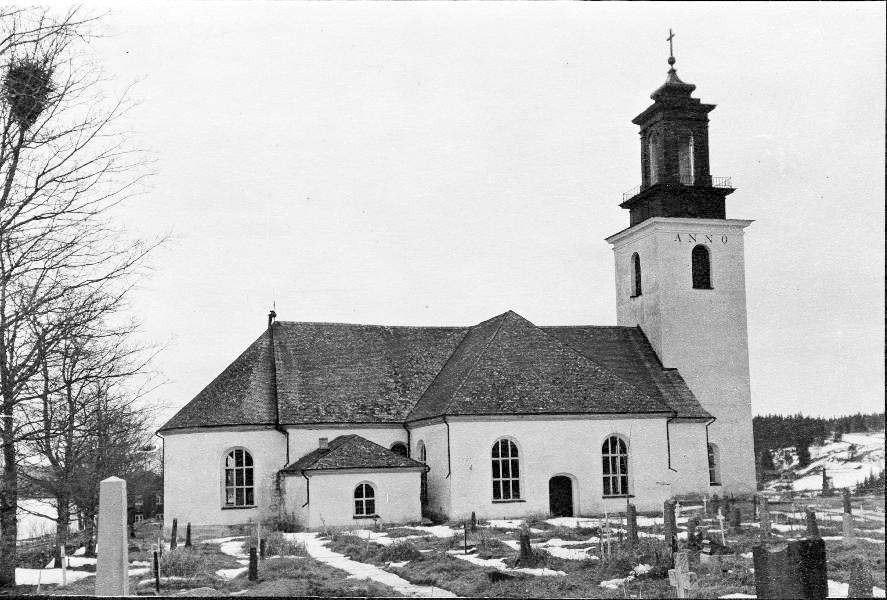
Gunnarskog church seen towards the north.

Gunnarskog (also called Stommen) is a locality in Arvika Municipality, Värmland County, Sweden with 290 inhabitants in 2010.

== Skramlestenen ==
Skramlestenen or The Skramle Stone is an old Runestone found in 1990.
