= Kjellaug Nordsjö =

Swedish-Norwegian artist (1926–2021)

Astrid Kjellaug Nordsjö (November 14, 1926 – March 31, 2021) was a Swedish-Norwegian artist. Nordsjö is considered one of the Nordic countries' foremost icon painters. She is represented in the Saint Catherine's Monastery in Egypt, in churches in Rome, London and New York City, but most of her artistic work is found in churches and chapels along with private collections in Norway and Sweden.

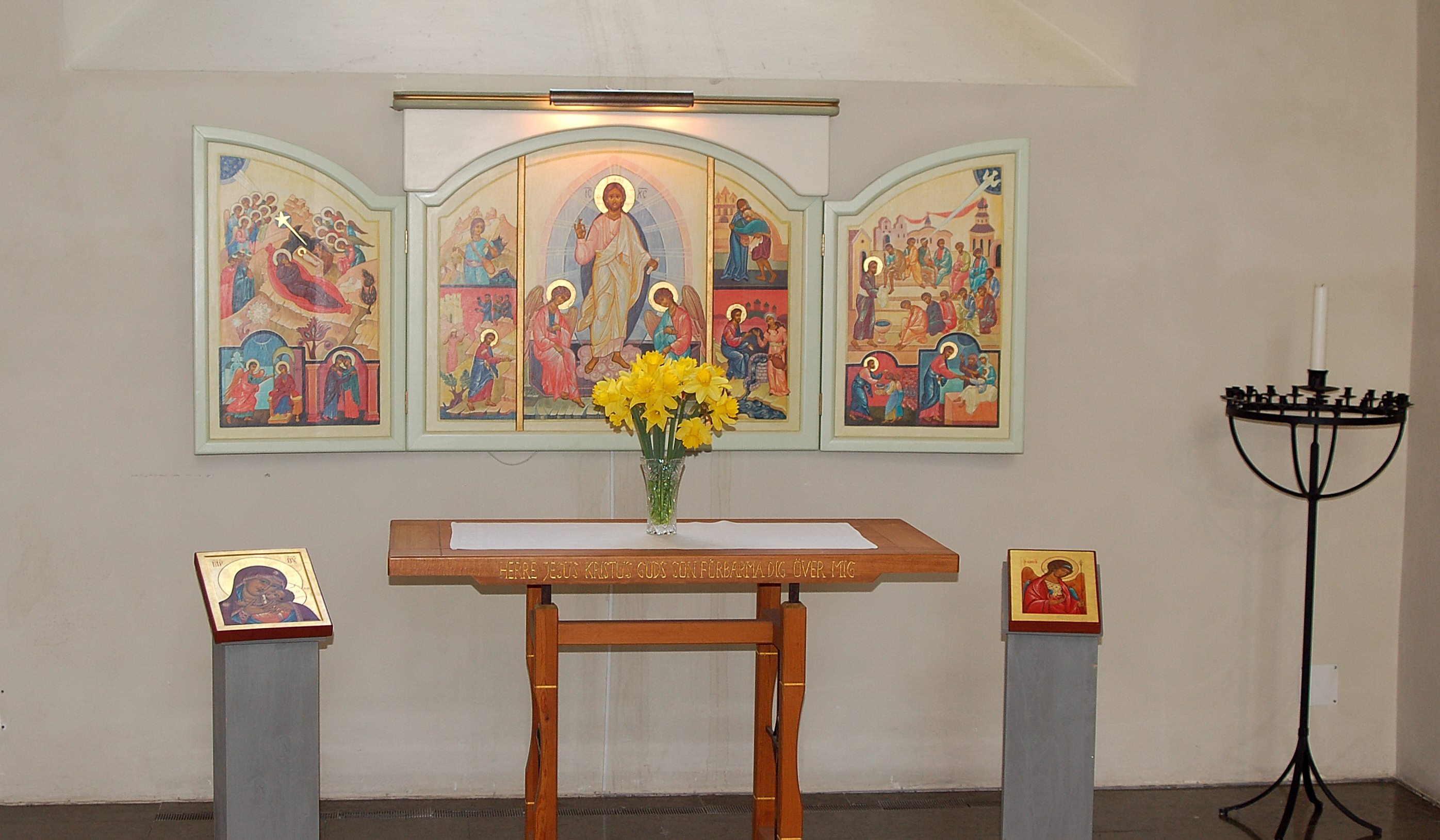
Altarpiece by Kjellaug Nordsjö (1998) in the Chapel of Revelation at Karlstad Cathedral

Kjellaug Nordsjö was born in 1926 in Vestfossen, Norway, to a farming family with five daughters, where she was the oldest. The farm where the family lived was occupied during the German occupation of Norway during World War II by German soldiers. After the war, Nordsjö began studying at an art school in Oslo, where she was accommodated by acquaintances of her family. Later she was employed at the Norwegian Seamen's Church in Rotterdam, and at the same time she could continue studying at a local art school there. In Rotterdam. she came in contact with icons and icon painting. Back home in Vestfossen, she married the local parish minister Per Nordsjö. The couple soon moved to Sweden where the shortage of ministers in the Diocese of Karlstad was the reason why Norwegian ministers with families were attracted there. One of them was the Nordsjö family, who settled near the Norwegian border in Bogen's vicarage in northern Gunnarskog. Besides her duties in the vicarage, she did some artistic work, mainly batik and painting.

When her husband retired and the family moved to Arvika, her artistic activity increased. Her husband took care of the household and finally Nordsjö was able to devote herself to icon painting full time. In 1982-1987, she participated in art courses in Paris for the icon painter Robert de Caluwé. She also worked with icon painters Erland Forsberg, Gothenburg, and George Drobot, Paris. Kjellaug Nordsjö painted almost 3,000 icons ranging from the small format to big pictures. She died at the age of 94 in 2021 in Arvika, Sweden.
