= Vestfos Cellulosefabrik =

Norwegian pulp and paper mill (1886–1970)

AS Vestfos Cellulosefabrik
- Type: Aksjeselskap
- Industry: Pulp and paper industry
- Founded: 1886
- Defunct: 1970
- Headquarters: Vestfossen, Øvre Eiker, Buskerud, Norway
- Products: Sulfite cellulose, paper

Vestfos Cellulosefabrik was a Norwegian pulp and paper manufacturer located in Vestfossen in Øvre Eiker. Founded in 1886 as a cellulose factory, it expanded into paper production from 1912 onwards. The factory produced bleached sulfite cellulose and fine paper, and operated until 1970.

== Establishment ==
On 26 March 1886, the founding general meeting of the joint-stock company Vestfos Cellulosefabrik was held in Kristiania (now Oslo). The central figures behind the enterprise were Wilhelm Melhuus from Drammen and Anton Løvstad, originally from Østfold. Melhuus was the businessman and served as director from the outset, while the engineer Løvstad provided the technical expertise.

Melhuus was a well-known businessman from Drammen who had responsibility for Krogstad Spigerfabrik and was among the investors in Embretsfos Træsliberi in Modum. It was his network of contacts in Kristiania that provided the capital necessary to establish Vestfos Cellulosefabrik. Løvstad had previously likely worked at Blaafarveværket in Modum, and had also been involved at Vadrette in Skien, where Norway's first sulfite plant was established.

Construction of the factory began before the general meeting was held in Kristiania, and trial production took place as early as 1886. In the first full year of operation, 1887, output reached approximately 846 tonnes of cellulose across three digesters, each producing 1,000 kilograms per day. With its establishment in 1886, Vestfos Cellulosefabrik was the first in the Drammen district to produce cellulose. However, the method favoured by engineer Løvstad proved unsuccessful, and after five years the factory was forced to purchase a patent developed by Bøhnsdalen Cellulosefabrik.

== Expansion ==
From 1895 the factory considerably extended its interests, acquiring two mechanical pulp mills, a flour mill, and a sawmill in the surrounding area between 1895 and 1906, giving it ownership of the waterfall and surrounding properties.

The plant underwent several modernizations. By 1911 it was equipped with seven cellulose digesters and two drying machines, giving an annual production of 9,500 tonnes of cellulose. Two further digesters were subsequently added, and with nine digesters the plant produced 15,000 tonnes of sulfite cellulose in 1920.

In 1911–1912, Vestfos Cellulose began paper production, making it a combined pulp and paper mill. Production of MG paper (machine glazed) commenced on two paper machines, each with a working width of 305 centimeters. By 1915 the factory produced 7,000 tonnes of paper and employed around 320 workers across the cellulose and paper operations. By 1918, the paper mill required 6,000 tonnes of sulfite cellulose annually.

In 1914, only a few years after paper production had begun, the cellulose plant suffered a fire that destroyed the sulfur house and acid towers. Following the fire, 400,000 kroner in new share capital was raised, and the company borrowed 1.5 million kroner from supreme court advocate Frantz F. Melhuus, relocating its head office from Kristiania to Vestfossen. Also in 1914, paper production was reorganized: one of the paper machines was converted to produce tissue paper, while production continued on two machines. By 1920, with paper production well established, the workforce had grown to 350 employees.

== Interwar period and World War II ==
The interwar period brought severe difficulties for the pulp and paper industry as a whole, including Vestfos Cellulosefabrik. Following a sharp fall in export prices and a subsequent 15 percent wage cut, a strike lasting 25 weeks took place in 1931.

After the German invasion during World War II, the factory was incorporated into the German war economy, producing paper for the Danish and German markets. During the war, Vestfos Cellulosefabrik continued to operate at relatively high capacity, reaching 80 percent of pre-war production in 1942 and 60 percent in the period 1943–1945.

== Postwar period ==
After the war, production was concentrated increasingly on fine paper. The tissue machine was eventually replaced, requiring a major conversion of the second paper machine (PM2) from a combined machine to a pure multi-cylinder machine. The converted machine, with a working width of 305 centimeters, was put into fine paper production, which by the mid-1960s reached 12,000 tonnes annually, using 8,000 tonnes of bleached cellulose produced on site. The cellulose plant produced approximately 27,000 tonnes in total, considerably more than was consumed internally, with the surplus sold on the market.

== Bankruptcy and closure ==
Despite considerable investment, the focus on fine paper proved misguided. After several years of operating losses, the company was declared bankrupt in 1967. Operations were continued by Greaker Cellulosefabrik until 1970, when the business finally ceased. At the time of bankruptcy the company had 313 employees; 230 workers lost their jobs at the final closure.

The closure of Vestfos attracted widespread attention and debate. In 1971, several prominent radical actors wrote and staged the play Svartkatten based on the events surrounding the closure. The insurance company Norvegia, one of the creditors, purchased the plant for 8.1 million kroner with the intention of selling it to a new operator in the pulp and paper sector, but was unsuccessful. Vestfos Fagforening (the factory's trade union) was dissolved simultaneously with the closure of the factory in 1970.

== Trade union ==
Despite the factory's significant workforce and its potential for labor organization, the first two attempts to form a union, in 1906 and 1907, failed. On the initiative of Jens Edvardt Retvedt (1855–1937), Vestfos Fagforening was established in 1910.

The union was initially affiliated with Norsk Arbeidsmandsforbund, but after Norsk Papirindustriarbeiderforbund was founded in 1913, it transferred its affiliation to the new federation, receiving branch number 41. Membership grew rapidly, from 42 at the time of founding to 150 members two years later.

== Bibliography ==
- Drammenselvens forurensning ved træmasse-, cellulose- og papirfabrikkerne 1911 og 1912, Kristiania, 1915.
- Kaldal, Ingar (1989): Papirarbeidernes historie. Norsk Papirindustriarbeiderforbund 1913–1988, Oslo, p. 300.
- "Vestfos Cellulosefabrik", section in the unsigned article series "Litt om den norske celluloseindustris historie 1873–1890", in Papir-Journalen, no. 9/1941, pp. 83–84 and no. 10/1941, pp. 91–93.
- Skeie, Jon: Fra splittet storbygd til kommunalt fellesskap. Øvre Eikers historie, parts 1 and 2. Published 2015 and 2016.
