= Schou =

Schou is a Scandinavian surname. Notable people with the name include:

- Jens Schou Fabricius (1758–1841), the Norwegian appointed Minister of the Navy 1817–1818
- Laila Schou Nilsen (1919–1998), Norwegian speed skater, alpine skier and tennis player
- Albert Schou (c. 1849 – 1900), Danish photographer
- August Schou (1903–1984), Norwegian historian
- Christian Schou (1792–1874), Norwegian merchant, farmer, brewer and politician
- Corey Schou, University Professor of Informatics and Associate Dean at Idaho State University
- Einar Oscar Schou (1877–1966), Norwegian architect
- Eivind Schou of Serena-Maneesh, an alternative rock band from Oslo, Norway
- Frida Schou (1891–1980), early Danish businesswoman, brick manufacturer
- Halvor Schou (1823–1879), Norwegian industrialist
- Ingjerd Schou (born 1955), Norwegian politician for the Conservative Party
- Jens Christian Schou (1918–2018), Danish medical doctor and Nobel laureate
- Julius Schou (1849–1929), American soldier in the U.S. Army
- Ludvig Abelin Schou (1838–1867), Danish Romantic painter
- Mogens Schou (1918–2005), Danish psychiatrist, pioneered lithium for bipolar disorder
- Peter Alfred Schou (1844–1914), Danish painter, the brother of Ludvig Abelin Schou
- Schou (Norwegian family), Danish-origined Norwegian family
- Tim Schou of A Friend in London, Danish pop rock and rock band
- Kjell Schou-Andreassen (1940–1997), Norwegian footballer and football manager

== See also ==
- Hansen, Schou & Weller, photographic studio in Copenhagen
- Chou (disambiguation)
- Schout
- Schouten (disambiguation)
- Schouw
- Skou (disambiguation)
- Skov (disambiguation)
- Skouv
- Shou (disambiguation)
