= Schou (Norwegian family) =

Norwegian family of industrialists

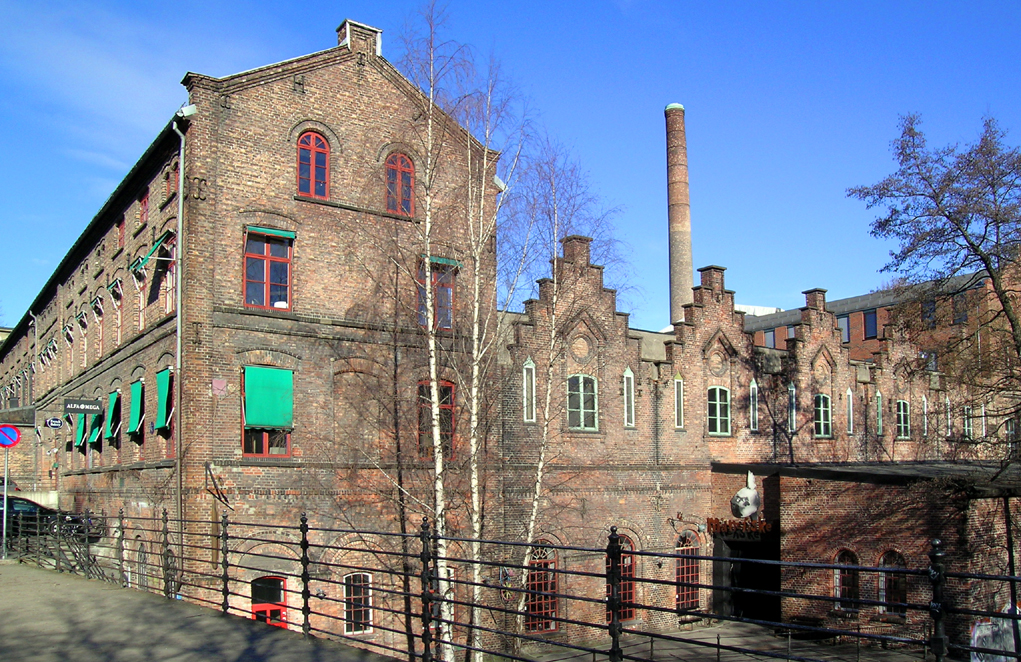
Hjula Væverier, established by Halvor Schou

Schou is a Norwegian family of Danish origin. Christian Julius Schou became owner of the Schou Brewery (Schous Bryggeri), which was owned by the family from 1821 to 1898. His son Halvor Schou became a leading industrialist and established Hjula Væverier, Norway's largest industrial company at the time. He also inherited the Schou Brewery, which had around thousand employees at that point in 1874. In 1855, he bought the Sinsen farm, and in the 1860s also the Løkenes farm in Aker, where he built the Esviken mansion, designed by Wilhelm von Hanno. His daughter Birgitte Halvordine Schou was married to the industrialist Einar Westye Egeberg, and their daughter Hermine (1881–1974) married Peder Anker Wedel-Jarlsberg.
