= Skow =

Skow may refer to:

- Some Kind of Wonderful (disambiguation)

== People ==
- Bradford Skow, American philosopher
- Jim Skow (born 1963), former American football defensive

== See also ==
- Skou (disambiguation)
