= Oluf Nicolai Roll =

Norwegian engineer, architect and politician

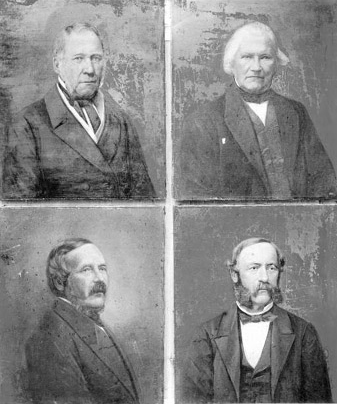
The founders of Nydalens Compagnie. Roll on the bottom right.

Oluf Nicolai Roll (25 October 1818 – 12 November 1906) was a Norwegian engineer, architect and politician. He was responsible for the industrial development of the area around the river Akerselva in Christiania, and served as Director General of Statens Havnevesen from 1861 to 1896.

== Personal life ==
Roll was born in Trondhjem, the son of Jacob Roll (1783–1870) and Emilie Pihl (1797–1822). He was a maternal grandnephew of Abraham Pihl. On the paternal side he was a half-brother of Ferdinand Nicolai Roll, Karl Jacob Roll and Selma Roll, Through them he was an uncle of Karl Roll and Arthur and Jacob Roll Knagenhjelm.

In May 1847 in Aker he married Hanna Christine Schou (1825–1867), a daughter of brewer Christian Schou and sister of Halvor Schou. They adopted the engineer Thomas Pihlfeldt.

== Career ==
Roll finished his secondary education in 1838, and then studied at the Royal Frederick University in Christiania, at the Polytechnische Hochschule in Hannover, and at the École des Arts et Métiers in Paris. Back in Norway he was manager at the paper mill at Bentse Brug.

In 1845 he founded the company Nydalens Compagnie together with Adam Hiorth, Hans Gulbranson and Ole Gjerdrum. He was a board member from 1845 to 1868. He contributed by designing all the buildings for the first spinning mill (1845–1847), and also at a later expansion in 1856 and the construction of a weaving mill in 1864. Nydalens Compagnie developed into the largest textile company in Norway from the 1890s. Roll has been called "Norway's first civil engineer", and also "a sort of a godfather to industrialism in Christiania." The founding of Nydalens Companie has been said to signal the start of industrialization in Norway.

Roll also founded Christiania Mekaniske Væveri in 1847 together with Hiorth, Gulbranson, Peter J. K. Petersen and Iver Olsen. He designed new buildings for the companies Bentse Brug (1850), Hjula Væveri (1854–1856; this company was owned by Halvor Schou), and Nedre Vøien Spinderi from 1860. He also acted as a consultant for Myrens Verksted and Kværner Brug.

In 1861 he was appointed Director General of Statens Havnevesen, a position he held until 1896. He was a member of the executive committee of the City Council of Christiania from 1856 to 1868. He was decorated Commander, Second Class of the Order of St. Olav in 1894, and was a Knight of the Order of Vasa.
