= Graah =

Graah may refer to:

- Wilhelm August Graah, Danish Arctic explorer
- Lille Graah, Norwegian journalist
- Knud Graah, Danish born Norwegian industrialist
- Graahs Bomuldsspinderi, a textile manufacturing company in Norway
- Graah Fjord, a fjord in Greenland
- Graah Mountains (Graah Fjelde), a mountain range in Greenland
