= Adam Hiorth =

Norwegian merchant and industrial pioneer

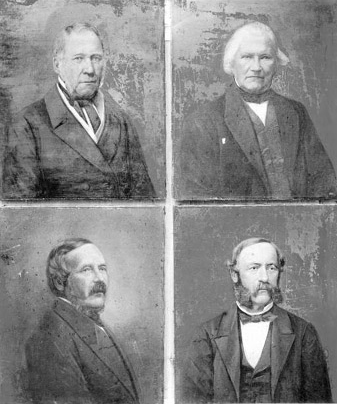
The founders of Nydalens Compagnie. Hiorth on the bottom left.

Adam Severin Hiorth (16 December 1816 – 20 December 1871) was a Norwegian merchant and industrial pioneer.

== Personal life ==
Hiorth was born in Drøbak as a son of shipmaster Fredrik Wilhelm Hiorth (1776–1844) and Louise Caroline Brodersen (1776–1860s). He died in Aker in 1871.

He married Anne Sofie Sommerfelt (1824–1898) in March 1849 in Lillehammer. She was a daughter of priest and botanist Søren Christian Sommerfeldt (1794–1838), and thus a sister of Christian Sommerfelt and Karl Linné Sommerfeldt.

He was an uncle of engineer Fredrik Hiorth and the grandfather of painter Agnes Hiorth. A son of Adam Hiorth married Giggi Sommerfelt, a daughter of dean Halfdan Einar Sommerfelt and granddaughter of Hiorth's business partner Ole Gjerdrum.

== Career ==
Hiorth finished school at 14, and then started working as a shop assistant. He was gradually given more responsibilities in the business, and also studied English and French language, and eventually passed the necessary examinations for getting a trading licence. In 1837 he started an agency in groceries and textiles, and in 1841 he co-founded the association Handelens Venner. He travelled to England to study new industrial technologies, in particular the cotton industry in Manchester.

Hiorth co-founded the company Nydalens Compagnie in 1845, along with wholesaler Hans Gulbranson, bailiff Ole Gjerdrum and engineer Oluf Nicolai Roll. The group bought rights to waterfalls of the river Akerselva in the valley Nydalen, where they built a cotton mill and later a weaving mill. Nydalens Compagnie developed into the largest textile company in Norway from the 1890s. It has also been said that Nydalens Compagnie, together with Nedre Vøiens Bomuldsspinderie, signalled the beginning of Norway's industrialization.

Hiorth also founded Christiania Mekaniske Væveri in 1847, together with Gulbranson, Roll, Peter J. K. Petersen and Iver Olsen. In 1857 Hiorth was a co-founder of the association Akerselvens Brugseierforening, a coordinating body for factories exploiting the waterfalls of the river Akerselva. Hiorth chose to resign as manager for the spinning mill in 1860, but was still a member of the board of directors. He was also a joint owner of other textile factories and of the match factory Jølsens Tændstikfabrik, and ran a trading company that imported lamp oil and machinery equipment.
