= Eureka mekaniske Verksted =

Former Norwegian ship pump manufacturer

- Company type: Aksjeselskap
- Industry: Mechanical engineering
- Founded: 1898
- Founder: Gustav Hartmann
- Defunct: 1987
- Fate: Merged into Kværner (Thune-Eureka, 1969; Kværner Eureka, 1987)
- Headquarters: Oslo, Norway
- Products: Ship pumps

Eureka mekaniske Verksted (Norwegian for "Eureka Mechanical Workshop") was a company in Oslo founded by Gustav Hartmann in 1898. The business started by the Akerselva and moved to Skøyen in 1908, developing over the 20th century into a leading producer of ship pumps. It began with small boat engines for the coastal fishing fleet and pumps for the shipping industry, with pumps eventually becoming the main product, moving from piston pumps to modern centrifugal pumps. By 1914 it had over 250 employees, and in 1964 the company advertised that more than 1,000 ships were sailing with Eureka equipment aboard.

In 1968 the business became part of the Kværner group, and the following year it merged with Thunes mekaniske Værksted to form Thune-Eureka, which in 1975 moved to Tranby in Lier. In 1987 Thune-Eureka was combined with Kværner Kulde and Myrens Verksted to form Kværner Eureka. Eureka still exists as a design, sales, and service company for ship-pump systems, with production at Sørumsand.
