= Peter J. K. Petersen =

Norwegian businessman

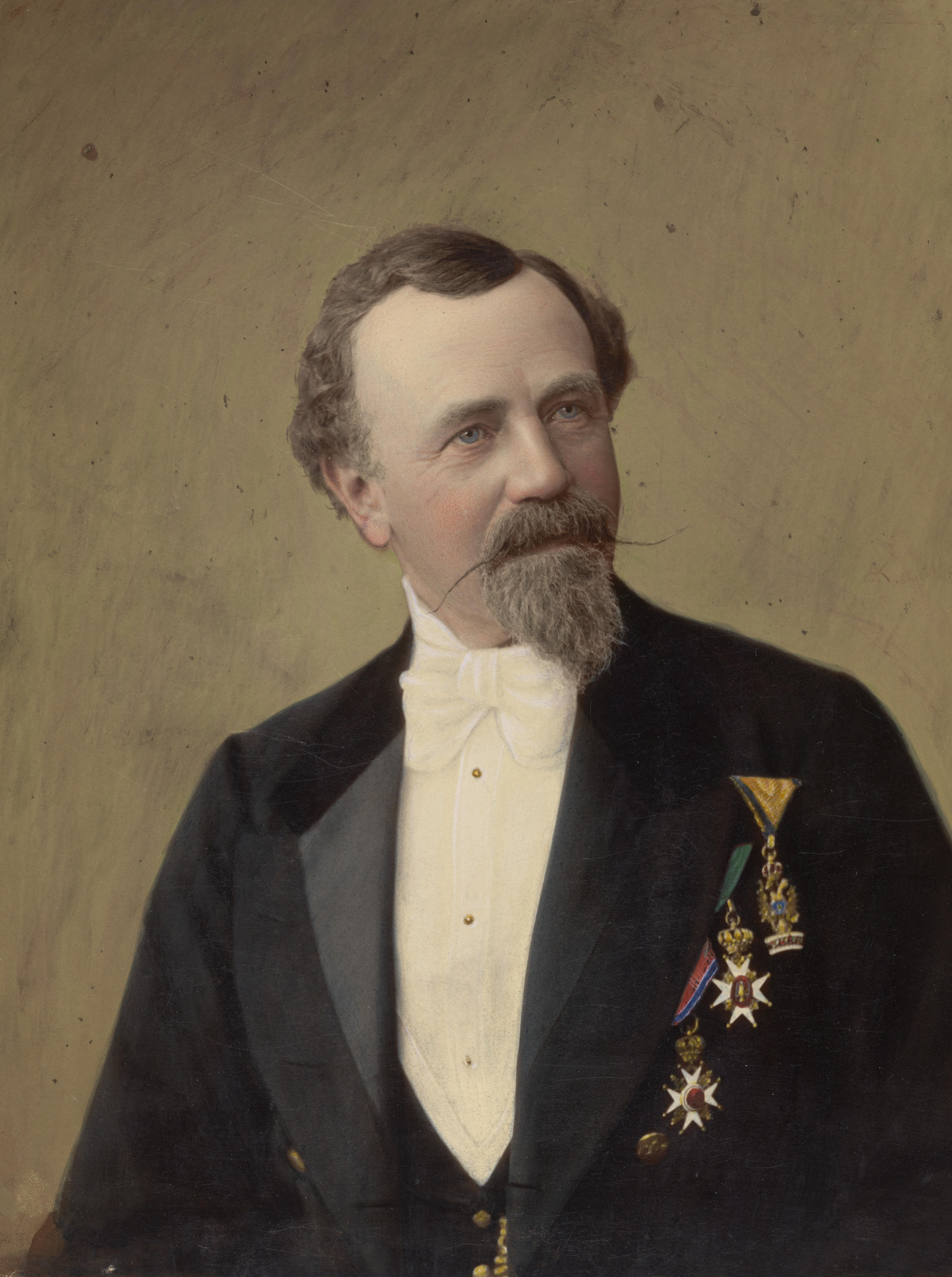
- Born: 9 June 1821; Christiania, Sweden–Norway
- Died: 15 March 1896 (aged 74)
- Relatives: Peter Arnoldus (adopted son)

Peter Johan Kay Petersen (9 June 1821 – 15 March 1896) was a Norwegian businessperson, known for his long leadership in the companies Peter Petersen & Co and Nydalens Compagnie as well as the construction of the building complex Victoria Terrasse, formerly known as Petersborg.

== Personal life ==
He was born in Christiania (now Oslo) as a son of merchant Sigwardt Blumenthal Petersen (1788–1865) and Elisabeth Carina Wiinholdt (1791–1826). He was a first cousin of Siegwart Petersen, uncle of Sigvart Petersen and great-granduncle of Carl Emil Petersen.

In January 1848 he married physician's daughter Nolda Døderlein (1820–1907). She was Danish. The couple did not have children of their own, but when Petersen's sister-in-law and her husband died, they adopted their nephew Peter Arnoldus Petersen.

== Career ==
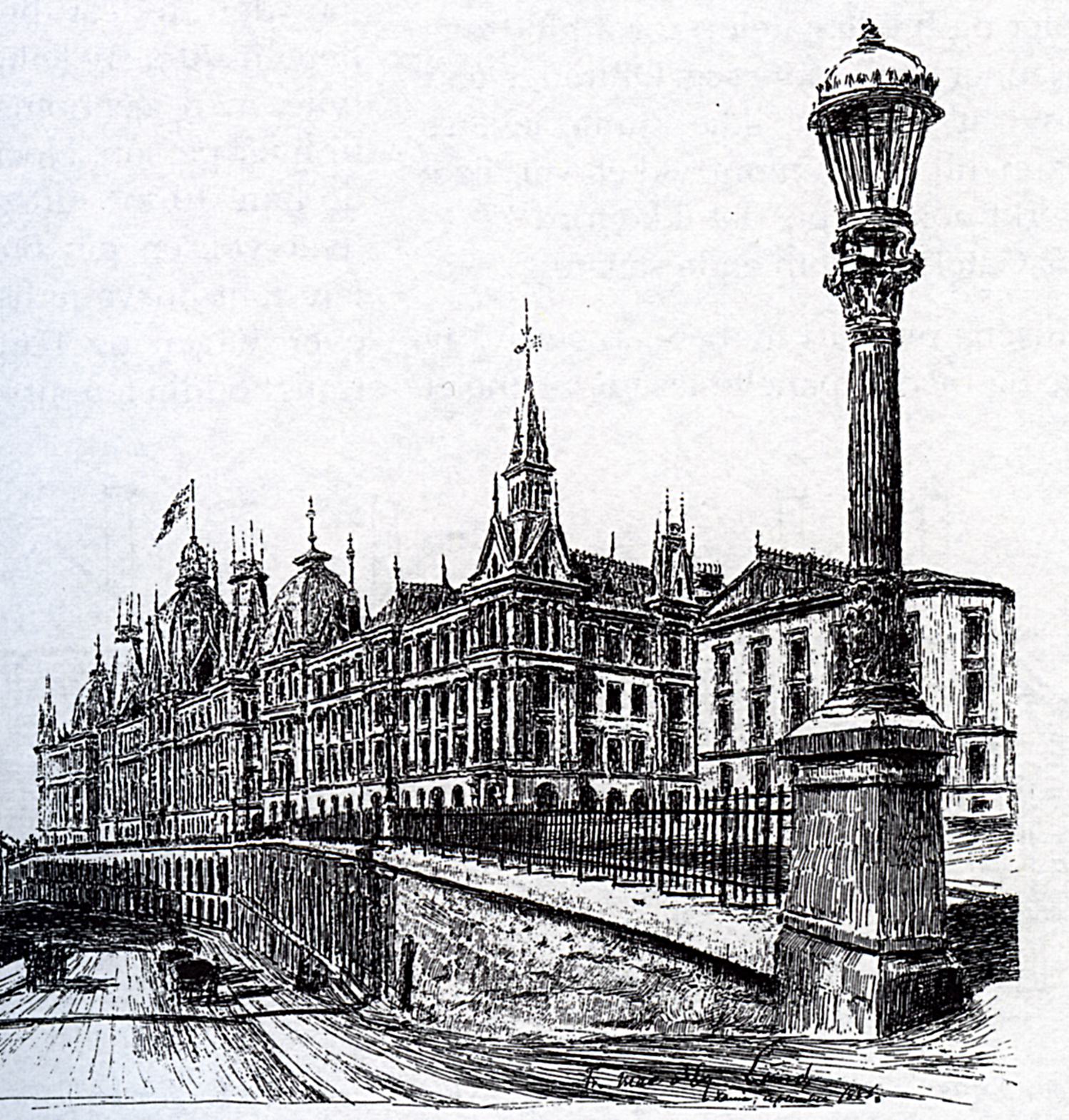
Victoria Terrasse, 1896 drawing

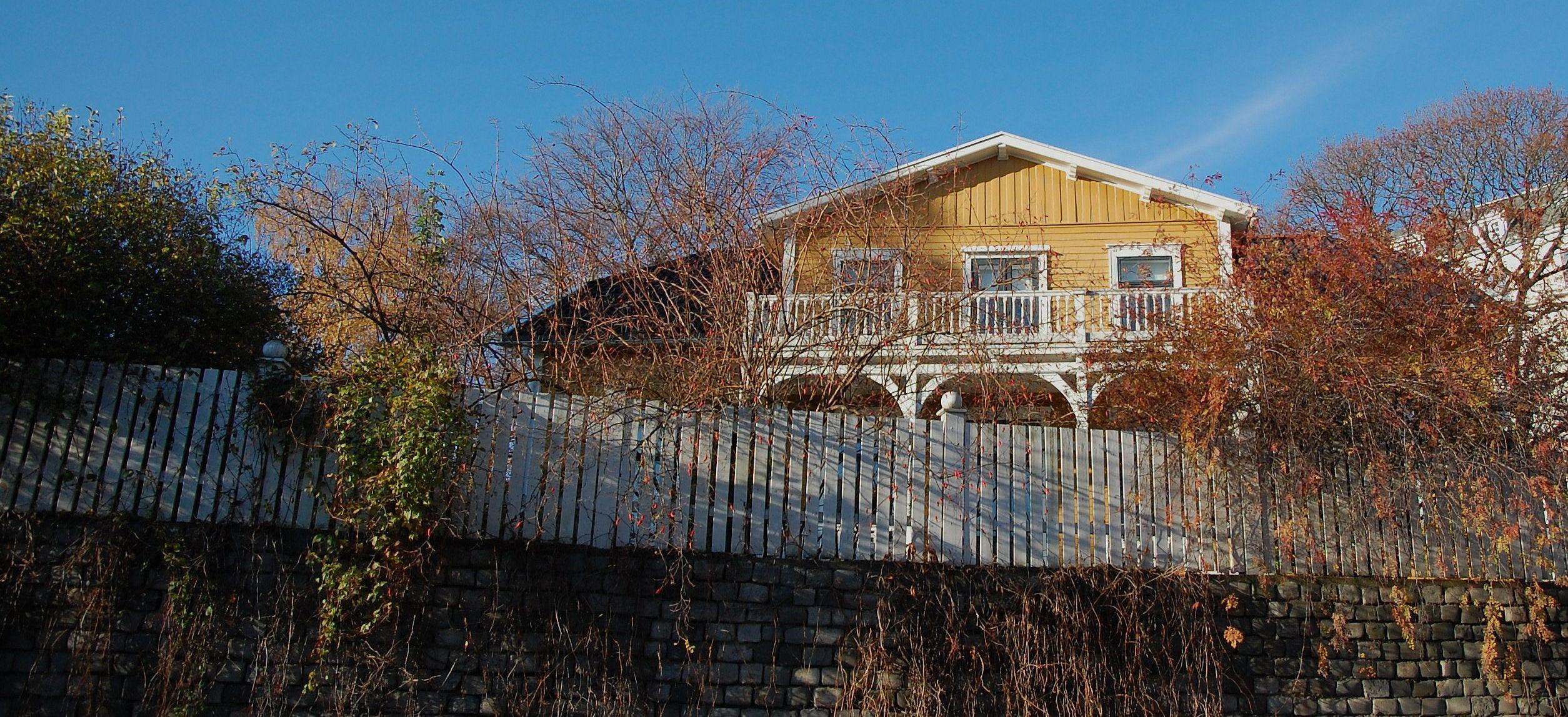
Gimle, Petersen's country house

In 1846, Peter Petersen received his burghership in Christiania, and took over his father's dry goods store, including the building at Karl Johans gate 16. The company was later named Peter Petersen & Co, and expanded considerably. While running this company, Petersen also forayed into other branches of enterprise. He became manager of the textile manufacturer Nydalens Compagnie in 1858 and served as such until 1889. He was also chairman of the board from 1868 to his death in 1896. He also founded Christiania Mekaniske Væveri in 1847 together with Iver Olsen and the Nydalens Compagnie associates Adam Hiorth, Hans Gulbranson and Oluf Nicolai Roll, and was among the owners of Grorud Kledefabrikk. He chaired the traders' interest group Christiania Handelsstands Forening from 1874 to 1880 and 1882 to 1886, and later became an honorary member. He was appointed Austrian consul in 1866, and consul general for the Austro-Hungarian Empire in 1874.

He led the development of what is now Victoria Terrasse between 1884 and 1890, which replaced more squalid dwellings known for their poor inhabitants. The new apartment complex was called Petersborg, but in 1913, in the aftermath of the 1899 real estate crash in Christiania, the complex had to be sold to the Norwegian state. The Ministry of Foreign Affairs is now located there. Petersen owned the country house "Gimle" near Frogner Church, and led an active upper-class social life there. He headed the arrangement committee for the famous speed skating race at Frognerkilen in 1885 between Axel Paulsen and Renke van der Zee. He was also a benefactor for city theatres, for the Museum of Decorative Arts and Design and Oldsakssamlingen.

Petersen was decorated as a Commander of the Order of St. Olav (1894), the Order of Vasa and the Order of Franz Joseph. When he died in 1896, his adoptive son inherited the family company and the title of consul, later becoming chair of Nydalens Compagnie in 1911. The family company was later run by Hans Bergsland from 1916 to 1922, and thereafter by Oscar Midtskau under the name Peter Petersen & Co.s Eftf.

Business positions
Preceded by Hans Gulbranson	Manager of Nydalens Compagnie; 1858–1889	Succeeded by N. Chr. Nielsen
Preceded by Hans Gulbranson	Chairman of Nydalens Compagnie; 1868–1896	Succeeded by Jørgen Meinich
