= N. Chr. Nielsen =

Norwegian businessman and politician

Niels Christian Nielsen, often shortened to N. Chr. Nielsen (1854 – 1916) was a Norwegian businessperson and politician.

He started his career in 1870, working for Peter J. K. Petersen and the warehouse of Nydalens Compagnie. In 1876 he was promoted to warehouse leader, when new facilities in Tollbodgaten were taken into use. After some time in the company Mantels in Hamburg, he returned to Nydalens Compagnie in 1886. He was a confidential clerk from 1886 and was promoted to manager in 1889, succeeding Peter J. K. Petersen. He remained manager in Nydalens Compagnie until retiring in 1914.

Nielsen was also a member of Aker municipal council. He chaired the employers' association De norske Tekstilfabrikanters Forening from 1899 to 1901 and Den norske Fællesforening for Haandverk og Industri from 1901 to 1912, and was a central board member of the Norwegian Employers' Confederation from 1900. He was also a board member of Akers Sparebank, and bank director from 1906 to 1910.

He was decorated with the King's Medal of Merit, the Order of St. Olav (Knight, First Class) and several foreign orders. He died in 1916.

Business positions
Preceded by Peter J. K. Petersen	Manager of Nydalens Compagnie; 1889–1914	Succeeded by Eduardo Blikstad
