= Peter Arnoldus Petersen =

Norwegian businessman

Peter Arnoldus Petersen (21 March 1851 – 12 August 1916) was a Norwegian businessman.

He was born in Christiania as a son of a German father and Danish mother; merchant Johan Gottfried Schmidt and Frederikke Døderlein. Both his parents died in 1852, and he was adopted by his mother's sister, who was married to wealthy businessman Peter J. K. Petersen (1821–1896). He was a first cousin of Sigvart Petersen.

His adoptive father died in 1896, and Petersen inherited the family company Peter Petersen & Co and his father's title as consul general for the Austro-Hungarian Empire. His adoptive father had been manager and chair of Nydalens Compagnie. Peter Arnoldus Petersen served as board member from 1883 to his death in 1916 and chair from 1911 to 1912. He backed down from the chairmanship because of declining health.

Business positions
Preceded by Jørgen Meinich	Chairman of Nydalens Compagnie; 1911–1912	Succeeded by Magnus Blikstad
