= Otto Gjerdrum =

Norwegian businessman

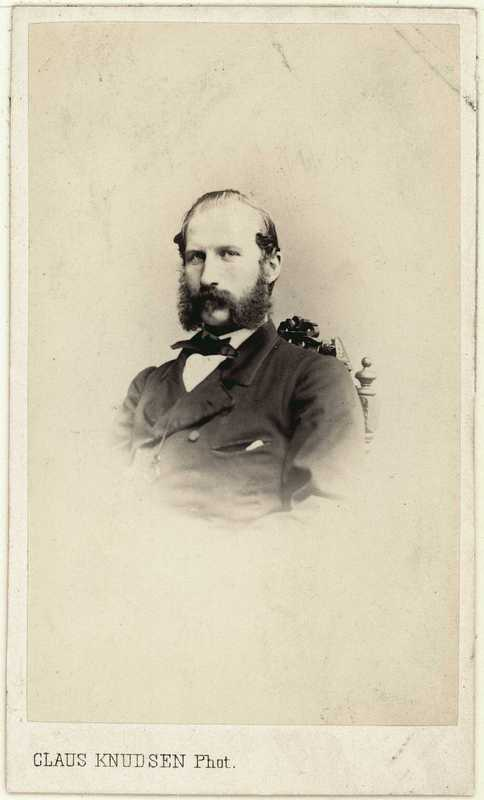
Otto Gjerdrum ca. 1870

Otto Gjerdrum (6 December 1831 – 7 March 1908) was a Norwegian businessperson.

He was a son of Ole Gjerdrum, and brother of Jørgen and Carl Ferdinand Gjerdrum. Through his sister Alette Jørgine Constanse Gjerdrum he was a brother-in-law of dean Halfdan Einar Sommerfelt. He was married three times. In 1864 he married Ingeborg Birgitte Wergeland (1847–1868, daughter of Harald Nicolai Storm Wergeland and Anna Sofie Schøyen). In 1872 he married Alette Constance Alette Falsen (1852–1883, daughter of stipendiary magistrate Enevold Munch Falsen and Elise Nicoline Aars). He married Inga Louise Falsen in 1884.

His father was a co-founder of Nydalens Compagnie in 1845. Otto Gjerdrum was the company's factory manager from 1860 to 1889, having taken over from co-founder Adam Hiorth. He was a board member from 1869 to 1908. He was also the founder of the Norwegian Association of Hunters and Anglers in 1871. He held the royal court title of Hofjægermester (hunting master of the court).

He was decorated Knight of the Order of St. Olav in 1885. He was an Officer of the French Legion of Honour and French Officier de l'Academie, Officer 4th class of the Dutch Order of Orange-Nassau, Knight, 3rd class of the Prussian Order of the Red Eagle, and Commander, 2nd class of the Swedish Order of Vasa.
