= Jørgen Meinich =

Norwegian jurist and industrialist (1820–1911)

Jørgen Henrik Meinich
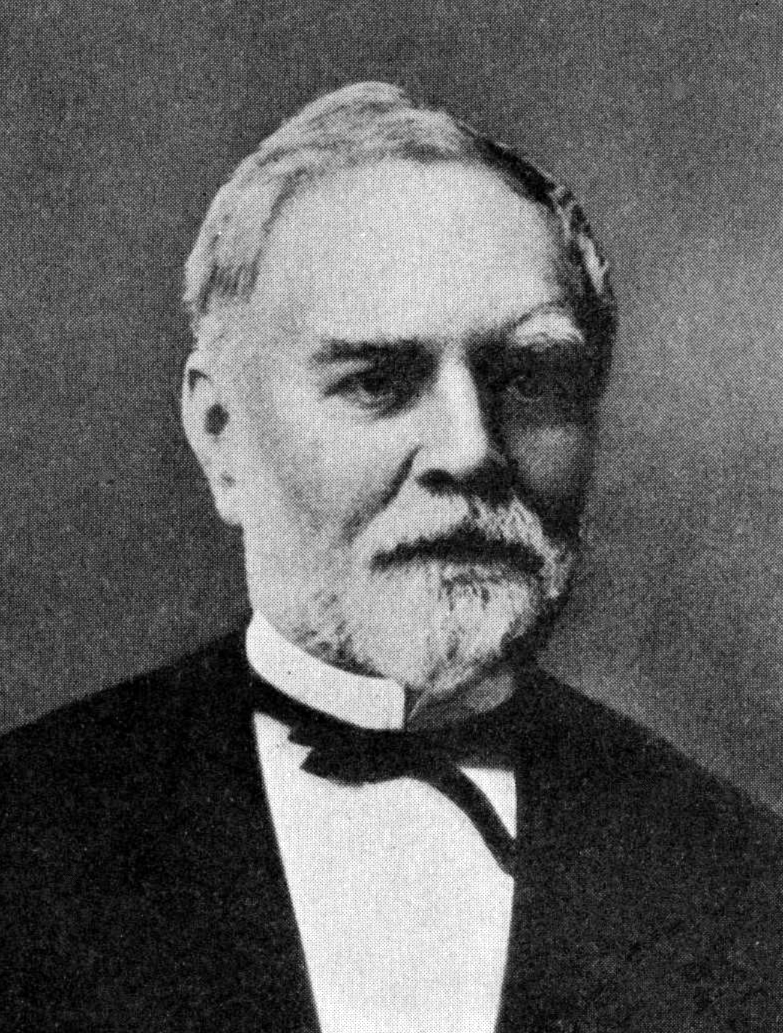
- Born: 24 March 1820; Søndre Land, Norway
- Died: 8 September 1911 (aged 91); Kristiania
- Occupations: jurist and industrialist
- Relatives: Hans Gulbranson (father-in-law); Jens Bratlie (adopted son)

Jørgen Henrik Meinich (24 March 1820 – 8 September 1911) was a Norwegian jurist and industrialist.

He was born in Søndre Land as a son of stipendiary magistrate Jens Christian Meinich (1787–1855) and Lisa Berg (1795–1824). He was a brother of Hans Thomas Meinich. In November 1847 in Christiania he married Claudine Birgitte Gulbranson (1823–1852), a daughter of Hans Gulbranson and half sister of Carl August Gulbranson. They adopted Jens Bratlie. He grew up at the manor Kronviken. He attended school in Skien and took the examen artium in 1839, then studied law to graduate with the cand.jur. degree in 1845. After a period as deputy judge in Ringerike, he worked in the Ministry of Finance until 1853. He settled at the property Bjølsen by the river Akerselva.

He was a pioneer in the development of the Norwegian wood processing industry and the use of hydropower in the industry. He established Norway's second pulp mill, Bjørsheim Træsliiberie, in 1865. He was a co-founder and first chairman of the association Akerselvens Brugseierforening from 1866 to 1891. He was also a joint owner of the companies Bentse Brug and Nydalens Compagnie. In Nydalens Compagnie he was a board member from 1868 to his death 1911, serving as chair since 1896. Outside of the Aker district, he was the first chairman of Ekers og Giethuus Papirfabriker when it was established as a joint stock company in 1873, and served as such until his death.

Meinich also chaired Norges Hypotekbank from 1885 to 1908, was a board member of the Norwegian State Railways and was active in the Royal Norwegian Society for Development. He was mayor of Aker Municipality from 1875 to 1877, and when his district was incorporated in the city Kristiania in 1878 he became a city council member.

He was decorated Commander of the Order of St. Olav (1897) and the Danish Order of Dannebrog, and Knight of the Swedish Order of the Polar Star. He died in Kristiania in September 1911, 91 years old, and was buried at Vår Frelsers gravlund.

Business positions
Preceded by Peter J. K. Petersen	Chairman of Nydalens Compagnie; 1896–1911	Succeeded by Peter Arnoldus Petersen
