= Bentse Brug =

Former paper mill in Norway

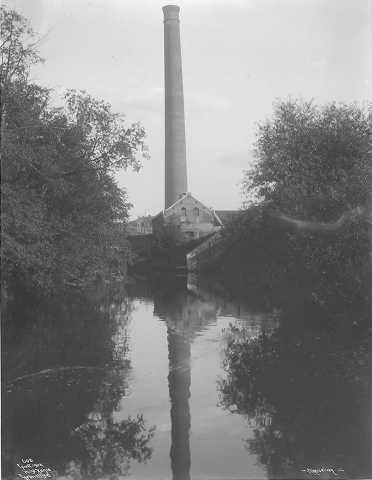
Bentse Brug in 1902.

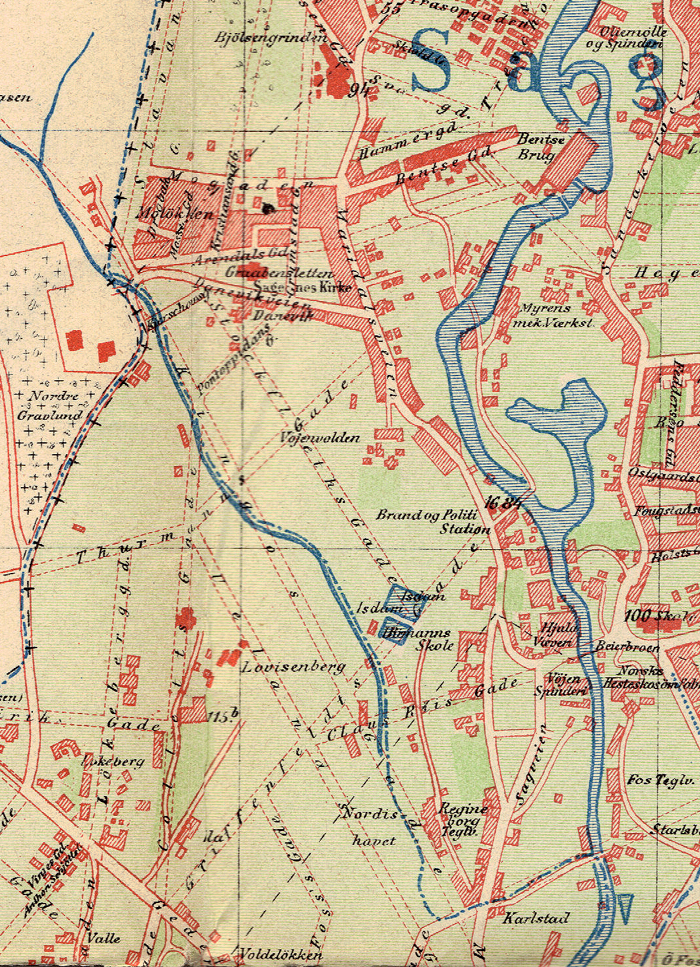
Map of Sagene c.1900, with Bentse Brug near the river.

Bentse Brug was an early Norwegian industrial site on both sides of the river Akerselva, just above the Bentse bridge in Oslo. It began as a corn mill and later became a paper mill. The paper mill, begun in 1686 and in production from 1696, was the first in Norway. It produced paper until 1889 and was finally closed in 1898.

== History ==
The corn mill was started and run by the businessman Ole Bentsen (1653–1734), who, after a business trip to the Netherlands, conceived the idea of producing paper at the site. The paper mill was begun in 1686 but did not start production until 1696, made possible by a business partnership with Gerhard Treschow (1659–1719) three years earlier. The partnership produced Norway's first paper factory.

The collaboration between Bentsen and Treschow went poorly. The same year production began, the two became involved in a legal dispute that Treschow won, sidelining Bentsen, who was granted redress in 1716. Under Treschow the factory was called Øvre Papirmølle, though it remained popularly known as Bentse Brug, and after several years of poor profitability he sold it in 1717. The Christiania firm Collet & Leuch set up a competing operation, Nedre Papirmølle, in 1739, and the two factories shared management for the half-century from 1748 to 1798. Bentse Brug was run by Ludvig Maribo between 1807 and 1822, and under his ownership an addition was built on the opposite side of the river, called Bentse Papirmølle.

The 1840s and 1850s are regarded as the start of industrialisation in Norway, and the Akerselva became the country's most important industrial area; where sawmills and corn mills had dominated the riverbanks, factories now arose in large numbers, especially in the textile and mechanical industries. Bentse Brug entered the industrial age in this period. In 1838 it received the country's first paper machine, ordered from England by Jacob Juel and Svend Moestue, probably 70 inches wide and with three drying cylinders. Paper production became much more efficient than before, though the raw material remained the same, cellulose fibers from cotton and linen obtained from rags; rye straw later came into use alongside rags. In 1851 Bentse Brug was bought by Morgenbladet's editor-in-chief Adolf Bredo Stabell and later the harbor engineer Oluf Nicolai Roll, who tore down the old wooden buildings on the west side of the Akerselva and put up a modern three-story masonry paper factory. It was then driven by a 60-horsepower turbine and two water wheels of 10 and 20 horsepower, could produce 200 reams of writing paper a day, employed 100 workers, and ran day and night.

=== The country's first wood-grinding mill ===
Demand for paper rose considerably in the 18th and 19th centuries, not least because of the spread of newspapers. Securing enough rags became a major problem, and an intense search began for new raw materials. The solution was wood fiber. In the 1840s the German Friedrich Gottlob Keller found a method of extracting wood fiber from timber that, together with rag pulp, could make usable paper. Heinrich Voelter took over the invention and, with the small mechanical workshop J. M. Voith in Heidenheim, Germany, developed efficient machinery for the process, exhibiting a complete wood-grinding mill at the 1855 Paris World's Fair and laying the basis for modern paper industry.

In 1858 Viggo Drewsen was hired as technical head of the mill, and in his time Bentse Brug was the first to use wood pulp in paper production. The factory is said to have developed its own grinding machinery, a small apparatus with a feed box for the billet and a weight that pressed it against a horizontal grindstone, some of which may have been supplied by Myrens Verksted. The mill operated for only five years, with few workers and a modest production of about 100 tonnes of wood pulp a year. What may be called the first wood pulp factory in the country was Bjørsheim Træsliberie in Nydalen, built by Jørgen Henrik Meinich at Bjølsen Hovedgård in 1865 and in operation until 1890, which supplied about 300 tonnes of wood pulp to Bentse Brug a year. Bentse Brug also received pulp from another small mill, built at Stiklen near Trøgstad in Østfold by the parliamentarian Olai P. Wiig. In 1872 Valdemar Drewsen himself built a mill at Skotfoss near Skien to secure the raw material supply for paper production at Bentse Brug.

Drewsen ran Bentse Brug under the company Drewsen & Søn, at the time the largest and most modern paper factory in Norway. He acquired several paper machines for the mill, one in 1858 from Bertrams Ltd. in England and another in 1870 from the neighboring Myrens Verksted, the latter the first paper machine produced in Norway. Around 1875 Bentse Brug received its fourth paper machine, this time from Bentley & Jackson in England. Most of the production went to newsprint, and from the 1880s only to that; earlier it had produced much writing paper, and Bentse Brug had also been the main supplier of paper for Norway's first postage stamps.

=== The 1890s ===
In 1889 the partnership then running Bentse Brug went bankrupt, and the brothers Carl and Hartvig Bache-Wiig took over the factory, carried out an extensive modernisation, and ran the business under the name Akerselvens Papirfabriker. The brothers had long experience in the wood-processing industry, having grown up with their adoptive father Olai P. Wiig, who had established the mill and board factory at Stiklen in Østfold, and they later built up Bøhnsdalen Fabrikker near Eidsvoll. In 1893 they also bought Embretsfos Træsliberi in Modum and formed the company Akerselven-Embretsfos A/S. Under the Bache-Wiig brothers, cellulose for paper production was bought from Bøhnsdalen and wood pulp from Embretsfos. Bentse Brug was the first paper factory in the country to use sulphite cellulose in production.

The sulphite method was a way of producing cellulose from timber. Unlike the mechanical grinding of wood pulp, cellulose production involved chemically cooking timber in various chemicals to separate the cellulose fibre from the wood's other components; the sulphate method was another way of doing this with different chemicals. Cellulose gave the paper stronger fiber than wood pulp could and could replace rag pulp in paper production, but cellulose cooking was a more costly process, and rags were used as a raw material long after the first cellulose factories were established in the 1870s and 1880s. At Bentse Brug, rags were used as a raw material right up until 1898, when the factory closed.

=== Closure ===
There were several reasons for the closure of Bentse Brug. Not least, transport conditions along the Akerselva were difficult; for a time there was talk of canalising the lower part of the river to ease transport from Oslo harbour to the factories in the area, as most goods had to be carried by horse and cart. Toward the end, 30 horses handled transport to and from Bentse Brug, in long rows of hundreds for large shipments. The possibilities for expansion were also limited, and the waterpower in the Akerselva was small relative to what modern machines and increased production required. There were also hard times around the turn of the century, and the Bache-Wiig brothers were close to bankruptcy. Environmental concerns were a further cause: the Akerselva was by then heavily polluted and caused problems for operation.

The first Norwegian-produced paper machine, from Myrens Verksted in 1870, was destroyed by fire at Bentse Brug shortly before 1900. The other machines were sold: Union in Skien took over the last paper machine Bentse Brug had acquired, the 1858 machine was sold to Klevfos Cellulose & Papirfabrik, and Norway's first paper machine, made by Bryan Donkin in 1838, was moved to Embretsfos and used as a cellulose take-up machine well into the 20th century. Many workers from Bentse Brug also moved to Embretsfos. In 1912 Myrens Verksted finally took over the old mill, and the buildings were demolished in 1976.

No buildings from Bentse Brug remain today, but the name Bentse is still attached to the area through Bentsegata, Bentsebrugata, and Bentsebrua. The factory building of the Nedre Papirmølle, in operation until the 1870s under the name Glads Mølle, still stands and is the oldest surviving factory building from the industry along the Akerselva.

== Bibliography ==
- Bull, Hans (1918). Akerselvens Brugseierforening gjennem femti år. 1867–1917. Kristiania.
- Jerman, Gunnar (2003). Akerselva. Fra sagatid til opera. Oslo.
- Malmstrøm, Kari Hoel (1982). Fabrikk og bolig langs Akerselva: Et industrimiljø på 1800-tallet. Norsk Teknisk Museum, Oslo.
- Myhre, Jan Eivind (1978). Sagene – en arbeiderforstad befolkes 1801–1875. Universitetsforlaget, Oslo.
- Noraker, Anne Marit (2006). «Papirets historie», in Tobias: Tidsskrift for arkiv og Oslohistorie, no. 1, 2006. Oslo byarkiv.
- Aarak, Asbjørn (1962). «Bentse Brug. Fabrikken som leverte papir til våre første frimerker», in Norsk Filatelistisk Tidsskrift, no. 4, 1962.
