= 1885 speed skating race at Frognerkilen =

The speed skating race at Frognerkilen in 1885 was a duel between Norwegian skater Axel Paulsen and Dutch skater Renke van der Zee. The race took place on the fjord ice on the bay of Frognerkilen, Kristiania, on 26 February 1885. Paulsen had been named "amateur champion of the world" following a series of victories in the United States in 1883 and 1884, and he was challenged by Dutch skater van der Zee. The competition was met with huge interest from the local population. A crowd of between 20,000 and 30,000 spectators witnessed the duel. The newspaper Morgenbladet published a special edition on the event. The duel was fought over a length of 3 English miles (4,827 meter). Paulsen won the race, finishing about one minute ahead of van der Zee. The prize money was 1,800 kr to the winner.

The organizing committee was headed by consul general Peter J. K. Petersen.
