= Sigvart Petersen =

Norwegian civil servant and hippologist

Sigvart Petersen, 1896

Sigvart Petersen (11 August 1845 – 29 November 1924) was a Norwegian civil servant and hippologist.

He was born in Christiania as a son of Carl Emil Petersen and Ane Persen. He was a nephew of Peter J. K. Petersen and first cousin of Peter Arnoldus Petersen. In February 1873 in Christiania he married Adeline Jepsen (1847–1924).

He finished his secondary education at Nissen School in 1865 and graduated from university with a cand.jur. degree in 1871. He was hired in the Ministry of Church Affairs in 1875, advancing from clerk to fullmektig in 1886 and assistant secretary in 1897. He retired in 1921.

He is better known for co-founding the Norwegian Trotting Association in 1875. He was the secretary of the board from 1875 to 1878 and 1886 to 1901, and edited Norsk traver-kalender, Norsk traver-stambog and from 1881 to 1888 the magazine Norsk idrætsblad. He published an Ahnentafel of Norwegian horses of the Dølehest breed in 1902, by request of the Royal Norwegian Society for Development, and has been called "the classic in Norwegian hippological literature". He also published an Ahnentafel of his own lineage in 1922.
