= Ole Gjerdrum =

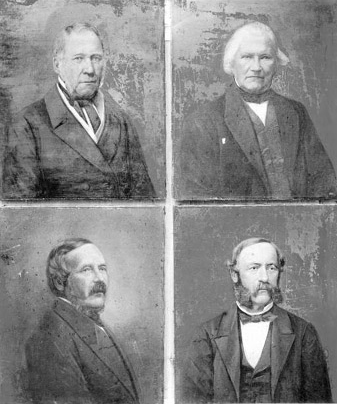
The founders of Nydalens Compagnie. Gjerdrum on the top left.

Ole Eliassøn Gjerdrum (22 April 1785 – 29 January 1858) was a Norwegian jurist, civil servant and businessperson.

== Career ==
He was born in Stange. He was a clerk for the district stipendiary magistrate until 1811. He then worked in Copenhagen and studied law, but when Norway achieved independence in 1814 he returned to his country of birth. After some time in the Ministry of Finance, where he advanced to assistant secretary in 1817, he was transferred to law enforcement. He tried to become burgomaster, but instead served as Chief of Police of Christiania from 1823 to 1831.

In 1829, the so-called "Battle of the Square" took place. Demonstrators were celebrating the Constitution of Norway, which had been outlawed by King Charles John of Sweden and Norway, and the police under Gjerdrum's command intervented, causing a civic outrage. Gjerdrum was awarded the Knighthood of the Order of Vasa for his service.

From 1831 to his death he was the stipendiary magistrate of Aker og Follo. In 1845 he founded Nydalens Compagnie together with Adam Hiorth, Hans Gulbranson and Oluf N. Roll. He was a board member from 1845 to 1858. Nydalens Compagnie developed into the largest textile company in Norway from the 1890s.

== Personal life ==
Together with Mette Alette Christine Krohn he had five sons and five daughters. The son Otto Gjerdrum was also involved in Nydalens Compagnie, and another son, Carl Ferdinand Gjerdrum, founded an insurance company. The son Jørgen Gjerdrum was a jurist, and married Lina Lange, a daughter of dean Alexander Lange and sister of Jacob Otto Lange. The daughter Alette Jørgine Constanse Gjerdrum (1833-1891), married her own cousin, dean Halfdan Einar Sommerfelt, and their daughter Giggi Sommerfelt married a son of Ole Gjerdrum's business partner Adam Hiorth.

Police appointments
Preceded by Ole Sem	Chief of Police of Christiania; 1823–1831	Succeeded by Andreas Boghardt Richter
