= Norsk idrætsblad =

Sports magazine in Norway (1878–1925)

- Categories: Sports magazine
- Founded: 1878
- Final issue: 1925
- Country: Norway
- Based in: Oslo
- Language: Norwegian
- ISSN: 1500-8991
- OCLC: 476358392

Norsk Idrætsblad (Norwegian: The Norwegian Sporting Gazette) was a sports magazine published from 1878 to 1925 under different titles in Oslo, Norway. It was the first sports magazine and one of the most read magazines in the country during its run.

== History and profile ==
The magazine was established as Norsk Skytter og Jægertidende in 1878. The headquarters of the magazine was in Oslo. It was restarted as a weekly magazine under the title Norsk Idrætsblad in 1881. The magazine appeared with this title until 1915, and its subtitle was organ for alslags sport (Norwegian: Organ for all kinds of sport). During this period David Didrichson, Sigvart Petersen and Hagbart Wergeland served as its editors-in-chief.

It was then merged with another magazine entitled Sport and was renamed as Norsk Idrætsblad og Sport. The magazine folded in 1925.

The magazine came out weekly between 1881 and 1883, and then its frequency switched to biweekly. It covered articles about both amateur and professional sports. However, it mostly featured articles and news about skiing, particularly between 1881 and 1915.
