= Carl August Gulbranson =

Norwegian businessman and politician

Carl August Gulbranson (6 August 1831 – 19 July 1910) was a Norwegian businessperson and politician for the Conservative Party.

== Personal life ==
He was born in Kristiania as a son of merchant and forest owner Hans Gulbranson and his second wife Helene Andersen. His half-sister Claudine married Jørgen Meinich.

In June 1862 in Kongsvinger he married Minda Ramm Juell from Sogndal. She was a daughter of Fredrik Christian Juell, mayor of Sogndal from 1842 to 1851. Their son Carl Gulbranson became a high-ranking military officer, whilst their daughter Lilla married Minister of Foreign Affairs Johannes Irgens.

Minda's sister Vally was married to surgeon Fredrik Gottlieb Olsen Ramm; thus Carl August Gulbranson was an uncle of Harald Ramm.

== Career ==
He finished his secondary education in 1848 and graduated from university with the cand.jur. degree in 1854. After two years in England and France, he worked as a jurist until 1861. He reached as high as being acting district stipendiary magistrate.

In 1861 he became a partner in his father's timber business, and when his father died in 1868 he became co-owner together with his brother. In the 1870s he bought his brother's share in the company. He also bought large areas of land in Namdalen and Enebakk. He died in Enebakk in July 1910.

He was against parliamentarism and was at times a political ally of King Oscar II. His organizational platform was the November Association, founded in 1880. In 1882 he was elected as a deputy representative to the Parliament of Norway from the constituency Kristiania, Hønefos og Kongsvinger, but he never met in Parliament. He participated in creating an alternative draft of the Norwegian Constitution, but it was not accepted by any parliamentary politician. Gulbranson also contributed to the November Association's publication Budstikken, but both the association and Budstikken were dissolved in 1887. He was then less active in politics, but issued the pro-royalist pamphlet Kongemagtens Stilling in 1898.
