= Bøhnsdalen Mills Ltd =

Former Norwegian pulp and paper mill

Bøhnsdalen Mills Ltd.
- Formerly: Bøhnsdalens Træsliberi; Bøhnsdalens Fabrikker
- Type: Aksjeselskap
- Industry: Pulp and paper
- Founded: 1872
- Founder: Olai P. Wiig
- Defunct: 1976
- Fate: Closed; cellulose operation taken over by Follum
- Headquarters: Bønsdalen, Eidsvoll, Norway
- Products: Wood pulp, paper, cellulose, rayon-grade cellulose

Bøhnsdalen Mills Ltd. (also known over its history as Bøhnsdalens Træsliberi, Bøhnsdalens Fabrikker, and as part of Mathiesen-Eidsvold Værk) was a pulp and paper company at Bønsdalen in Eidsvoll, Akershus. It was founded in 1872 and closed in 1976.

== Establishment ==
In 1872 the member of parliament Olai P. Wiig (1802–1887), together with his two adoptive sons, Hartvig and Carl Bache-Wiig, built the first wood-pulp mill on the Andelva river at Eidsvoll. Wiig is regarded as a pioneer of the Norwegian wood-pulp industry, having built a small pulp mill on his Stikla property in Trøgstad in 1867, only two years after Bentse Brug in Christiania had started the country's first wood-pulp mill. Bønsdalen, with its waterfall power, offered better prospects than the small plant at Trøgstad, and some of the machinery was transferred from Stikla. The business was soon expanded, first with board production on a Fourdrinier machine also said to have come from Stikla.

== Production ==
The mill produced wool board and straw board, and from 1878 also paper. In 1881 a brown-pulp digester was built and a second paper machine acquired, with brown wood-containing paper and board becoming the main products. By the 1880s about 70 workers were employed, and the pulp mill produced 3,500 tonnes of fifty-percent wet pulp a year. In 1884 a cellulose factory was added, producing sulfite cellulose; after a year it burned down, but was immediately rebuilt in brick and iron.

== New owners ==
When Wiig died in 1887, his adoptive sons became owners. Hartvig and Carl Bache-Wiig developed the plant technically, attracting able engineers and establishing the first company in Norway to carry out scientific research, and the bleached cellulose produced at Bøhnsdalen was considered the best in Scandinavia. Under the cellulose expert Viggo Drewsen, Bøhnsdalens Fabrikker became a technological center for the Norwegian cellulose industry in the early 1890s, by which time it was the country's second-largest pulp and paper company after Bentse Brug, producing about 8,000 tonnes of cellulose and 2,000 tonnes of paper a year.

The economic results were poor, however, and in 1889 the Bache-Wiig brothers sold their stakes to an English company to raise capital to buy Bentse Brug. Significant modernization and expansion followed, including a new paper machine and the start of newsprint production, and in 1896 a new cellulose factory was built on the other side of the river. A full crisis came with the bankruptcy of Christopher Christophersen, the leading financier in Norwegian pulp and paper, around the turn of the century, which dragged the company down with it; the English creditors took over and continued operations under the name Bøhnsdalen Mills Ltd.

== Under British ownership ==
Under the new ownership, and from 1903 the Finnish director Sigv. Lagermarck, the business was run with good results. Bøhnsdalen's role as a pioneer in cellulose continued, and it became central to the development of the new viscose-cellulose industry: the inventors of the viscose process, C. F. Cross and E. J. Bevan, worked closely with the company well before commercial production began around 1900. Bøhnsdalen became one of the first companies in the world to produce special cellulose for rayon manufacture, with regular exports of rayon-grade cellulose abroad, Courtaulds of England becoming the most important buyer. In 1907 the oldest cellulose factory was rebuilt for rayon-cellulose production, giving Bøhnsdalen a technological lead and a special international position in this field up to the 1930s.

In 1908 the paper factory and pulp mill burned to the ground. Because of concession laws on matters including forest ownership introduced by the government in 1906, the English owners were reluctant to rebuild, and in 1910 Mathiesen-Eidsvold Værk, under Haaken Larpent Mathiesen, bought the company instead. Mathiesen-Eidsvold Værk already owned four pulp mills along the Andelva, known as Mago A, B, C, and D, and large forests in Romerike. A new paper factory was built to the designs of the engineer Olaf Winsnes, along with a new 2,200-horsepower power station and a cableway for transporting pulp; two Fourdrinier machines and a Yankee machine came into operation from 1912, producing mainly newsprint (18,000 tonnes a year) and M.G. paper (3,000 tonnes a year), while cellulose production ran at 13,000 tonnes a year.

The factory at Bønsdalen created the first purely industrial settlement in upper Romerike, called Nygård, where many homes were built in the 1880s and 1890s.

== Trade unionism ==
Around 1900 Nygård had about 600 inhabitants, many having come from far away to seek work in the industry, and it became a cradle of the political and trade-union labor movement in the district. The Eidsvold Wood Pulp Association was founded in 1898 and wound up when the Eidsvold Labour Party was established for the 1901 municipal election. A new trade union, the Bøhnsdalen branch of the Norwegian Union of General Workers (later branch 33 of the Norwegian Paper Industry Workers' Union), was founded in 1904, and Bønsdalen too saw strong labor disputes, especially in the 1920s.

== Mathiesen-Eidsvold Værk ==
Mathiesen-Eidsvold Værk benefited from the economic boom that lasted until 1920, then struggled with serious financial problems through much of the interwar period; the production of rayon cellulose became its salvation, as demand for artificial silk rose dramatically and Bøhnsdalen, with little competition in this product in the 1920s, could charge double the price of other producers. When Jørgen A. Mathiesen took over after his father's death in 1930, rayon-cellulose production was doubled to 12,000 tonnes a year. The newsprint market failed completely in the 1930s, as it became impossible to compete with the large integrated foreign mills, so the Fourdrinier machines were converted to fine-paper production, raising capacity to 20,000 tonnes a year; with the shift to finer paper, the need for pulp fell and the Mago mills were closed one by one and replaced with power stations between 1935 and 1965.

The modernizations put the company on firm footing until the Second World War, during which operations continued at a minimum level; Jørgen Mathiesen was declared an enemy of Germany by the occupying power, and in this situation transferred half the firm to his son Haaken Severin Mathiesen.

== End of pulp and paper at Bønsdalen ==
In the 1960s Mathiesen-Eidsvold Værk restructured from pulp and paper toward timber and wood products, foreseeing the difficulties the Norwegian pulp and paper industry would face in the 1960s and 1970s. The mainstay of its pulp business, rayon-cellulose production, was no longer competitive on the world market: cellulose prices had fallen dramatically in the 1950s, and the most important buyer, Courtaulds, reduced and then ended its purchases in 1961. After large losses in 1962 and 1963 and talks with possible partners, A/S Follum took over the cellulose factory in 1965 and the paper factory was closed the same year; the cellulose factory was formally sold to Follum in 1971.

By then the plant was old and highly polluting, and environmental requirements became too great for many old cellulose producers in the 1970s. As part of a structural rationalization of the industry, plans were made to build a new cellulose factory at Tofte in Hurum to replace many of the old ones, and Bøhnsdalen was one of seven factories sacrificed for the establishment of the "New Tofte Cellulose Factory." Bøhnsdalen cellulose was closed in 1976, with a production capacity of 20,000 tonnes of sulfite cellulose a year and 80 employees.

== Bibliography ==
- Bache-Wiig, Hartvig (1916). "Hva jeg først hørte om og saa av træmasse". In Den Norske Træmasseforening 1890–1915. Kristiania.
- Lange, Even (1985). Fra Linderud til Eidsvold Værk, bd. IV. Treforedlingens epoke 1895–1970. Mathiesen-Eidsvold Værk, Oslo.
- Sejersted, Francis (1979). Fra Linderud til Eidsvold Værk, bd. 3. Den gamle bedrift og den nye tid. Mathiesen-Eidsvold Værk, Oslo.
- Eriksen, Leif H. (2005). Andelva, treforedling og Nygård. Eidsvoll historielag.
- Hauger, Terje (1976). Nedlegging av Bøhnsdalen Cellulose: problemløsning på lokalsamfunnsnivå. Institutt for samfunnsforskning, Oslo.
