= Drammenselvens Papirfabrikker =

Norwegian paper mill, 1873–2006

- Formerly: Ekers og Gjethus Papirfabriker
- Industry: Pulp and paper industry
- Founded: 1873
- Defunct: 2006
- Headquarters: Geithus, Modum, Norway
- Key people: Erland Kiøsterud, Harald Lyche (founders); Jørgen Meinich (first board chairman)
- Products: Groundwood pulp, greaseproof paper, newsprint

Drammenselvens Papirfabrikker was an industrial company located at Geithus on the Drammen River in Modum, Buskerud, Norway. It produced groundwood pulp and paper, primarily greaseproof paper and food-wrapping paper. Founded in 1873, it began production of groundwood pulp and paper just before Christmas 1876, processing its own pulp for in-house paper production. It was among the first facilities in Norway to operate as an integrated mill combining a wood-grinding plant and a paper factory in a single installation. The factory closed in 2006.

== Establishment ==
=== Ekers og Gjethus Papirfabriker ===
The initiative for establishing the business came from brothers-in-law Erland Kiøsterud and Harald Lyche, who purchased Geithusfossen watefall in 1872 for 6,000 speciedaler. They founded the company Ekers og Gjethus Papirfabriker with a founding capital of 100,000 speciedaler (approximately 400,000 kroner). Michael Hansen served as manager at startup, and Jørgen Meinich was chairman of the board.

At the time of establishment, it was not yet decided which technology the company would adopt. Michael Hansen and Jørgen Meinich contacted Heinrich Voelter in Germany in 1873. In the 1840s, machine manufacturer Voelter and Gottlob Keller had developed the groundwood process, which had been further refined by Oswald Meyhs's method for producing wood-based paper without chemical additives. Voelter was commissioned to design the first facility for Ekers og Gjethus Papirfabriker — a combined wood-grinding plant and paper factory, completed in 1876.

Shortly after startup, the company underwent changes in both production and technology. The first plant produced printing paper based on rags, straw, and wood fiber. In 1878, production shifted when Oswald Meyhs's patent for cooking spruce wood in the grinding process was adopted. Brown groundwood became the dominant raw material for producing wrapping paper — a pure wood paper also known as "naturell".

=== Reorganization and modernization ===
Due to financial difficulties, the original company Ekers og Gjethus Papirfabriker was dissolved in 1879 and renamed AS Drammenselvens Papirfabrikker. Share capital had by then grown to over one million kroner. The 1880s were good years at Drammenselva: the debts incurred at founding were steadily reduced, and by the end of the decade the company had equity of two million kroner.

During the 1880s, the company offset falling product prices through reductions in production costs. In 1886–1887, this put it in a position to install a new groundwood plant. With this expansion, the grinding plant and paper factory sat on opposite sides of the Drammen River; groundwood pulp was pumped through a 330-meter pipeline into the paper factory. The paper factory burned down in 1889 and resumed production from 1890 with new machinery, including two new paper machines. Their capacity was further improved so that production rose 44 percent between 1891 and 1896.

Profitability declined considerably during the 1890s as raw material prices rose, but the early 1900s brought renewed investment. Returns were good in the years leading up to World War I.

=== New investments ===
New investment at Drammenselvens Papirfabrikker focused on two areas in particular: internal transport systems and improvements to production flow, and the energy side of operations. In 1902, stokers were installed in the coal-fired heating plant, automating the firing process, and the steam and firing plant was replaced. Fuel costs remained high in the run-up to World War I, which drove the introduction of electric power at the factory. When the fourth paper machine was installed in 1911, it was decided to run it on electric power. The electricity came from a newly built power station of 500 horsepower, with a generator from Siemens and a turbine from Kværner.

=== Union takes over ===
World War I had a significant effect on the company's financial position. In 1914, timber and coal prices rose while paper prices fell, and export opportunities worsened. As the founding generation retired and capital dwindled, the company became increasingly vulnerable to outside ownership interests. The business was sold to the Union conglomerate in 1915.

In connection with the acquisition, the critical stance of Storting representative Christopher Hornsrud is worth noting. Hornsrud, himself from Modum and representing the Labour Party, described Union as "the dictator of the district" and warned the struggle would be pursued "to the utmost consequence." The trade publication Papir-Journalen countered Hornsrud's attack, emphasizing the benefits of the merger. Hornsrud did not prevail, and the Union conglomerate remained the owner of the facility well into the 1990s.

== Products ==
Brown groundwood paper was the dominant product at Drammenselva until 1919, after which market conditions steadily deteriorated. Shortly after World War I, management decided to shift production from brown paper to thinner printing grades. Sulfate cellulose — kraft paper — had displaced wrapping paper based on brown groundwood.

In 1930, the factory produced 18,044 tonnes across the grades of newsprint, wallpaper stock, machine-finished paper, and "middels" (middle-grade). As pressure grew to move toward better-priced grades, management chose to shift to greaseproof paper (matpapir) in 1936–1937. Greaseproof paper was used to wrap fatty products and food, and was commonly used as sandwich paper. The shift reduced the need for groundwood pulp, since greaseproof production was based on purchased sulfite pulp; the groundwood plant was consequently closed at the end of the 1950s.

During World War II, production was shaped by wartime conditions and largely consisted of spinnpapir (spinning paper), used to make paper twine.

== Postwar era ==
After World War II, the factory restarted under more normal conditions. Production resumed on two machines in 1946 — PM3 and PM4. PM1 was never restarted after the wartime halt, and PM2 had already been shut down in 1917. Operating two machines allowed management to plan improvements and modernization: during the 1950s, the boiler house was rebuilt, the electrical installation renewed, and individual motor drives added to various machines. Power from Gravfoss power plant was supplied via underground cable.

PM4 was rebuilt twice in the period 1950–1960. Newsprint production was discontinued in 1963, and both machines were then focused on various greaseproof grades. To compete with plastic film and aluminum foil, a new finishing process for the paper was introduced in 1960.

During the 1970s, trading conditions were difficult for Union-Geithus, as the company was now known. Sales were poor and large stocks accumulated. The management planned a transition to specialty paper grades, but the company's finances did not allow such a shift until the 1980s. Øyvind Haugen, in his book on the company, summarizes the 1980s as a decade of overall progress: modernizations and rebuilds improved production, and management decided to convert PM4 for specialty paper, specifically quilon-treated paper. By the end of the decade, in 1989, the company achieved its then-record greaseproof output of 14,381 tonnes, demonstrating that the shift to specialty grades had been successful.

== Ownership changes and closure ==
The early 1990s were marked by the disappearance of the Soviet Union as an important market, though management managed to capture market share elsewhere and avoid the worst consequences. Toward the end of the decade it became increasingly clear that the company would be sold.

The Union conglomerate had become part of Norske Skogindustrier in 1998, and the Geithus factory passed to the new owners. Norske Skog, which focused entirely on the production of wood-containing printing paper, had no long-term interest in retaining the Geithus specialty paper operation. M. Peterson & Søn A/S, the other Norwegian greaseproof producer, owned Peterson Greaker in Sarpsborg.

Norske Skog and the Peterson group formed a new company, Nordic Paper AS, in 2001, consisting of three factories — one in Sweden and two in Norway. In 2005, the Geithus machine produced approximately 25,000 tonnes of paper. In the winter of 2006, Norske Skog and M. Peterson sold their stakes in Nordic Paper; the company was taken over by NorgesInvestor AS, the holding company Petec, and two Nordic Paper employees. The group employed around 400 people in 2006, 220 of them across the two Norwegian plants.

In March 2006, it was decided to close the Nordic Paper facility at Geithus. The Modum plant had 114 employees when the closure announcement was made.

== Labor organization ==
A trade union was established at the factory in the early 1900s. Avdeling 44 Geithus Fagforening was founded in May 1906 by workers at Drammenselvens Papirfabrikker under the name Drammenselvens Papirfabrikers Papir og Tremassearbeideres forening, before being renamed Geithus Fagforening in 1911. At founding, the union was affiliated with Norsk Arbeidsmannsforbund; in 1914 it became part of Norsk Papirindustriarbeiderforbund, ending the affiliation with Norsk Arbeidsmannsforbund.

Membership at founding was between 40 and 50 workers. By 1920 the union had 262 members, and from after World War II through the 1990s membership remained just under 190.

== Bibliography ==
- Fiskaa, H. 1951: "Treforedlingsindustrien i Buskerud fylke." In Det norske næringsliv. Buskerud Fylkesleksikon. Bergen.
- Haakonsen, Ronald 1999: Union 125 år: 1873–1998. Skien.
- Haugen, Øyvind 1993: Union Geithus. A/S Drammenselvens Papirfabrikker. Lokalhistorisk Forlag.
- Haugen, Øyvind 2003: PM 3. Fra begynnelse til slutt 1897–2002. A/S Drammenselvens Papirfabrikker / Nordic Paper Geithus AS.
- Moen, Eli 1993: Modum – ei bygd, tre elver. Industrialiseringen av ei østlandsbygd 1870–1940. Modum, pp. 42–53, 180–189.
