= Gerhard Treschow =

Danish-Norwegian merchant and industrial pioneer

Gerhard Treschow (c.1659 – 23 May 1719) was a Danish-Norwegian merchant and industrial pioneer. Treschow was an important industrial pioneer who founded several companies in Christiania and he was one of the first Norwegians to produce large-scale paper.

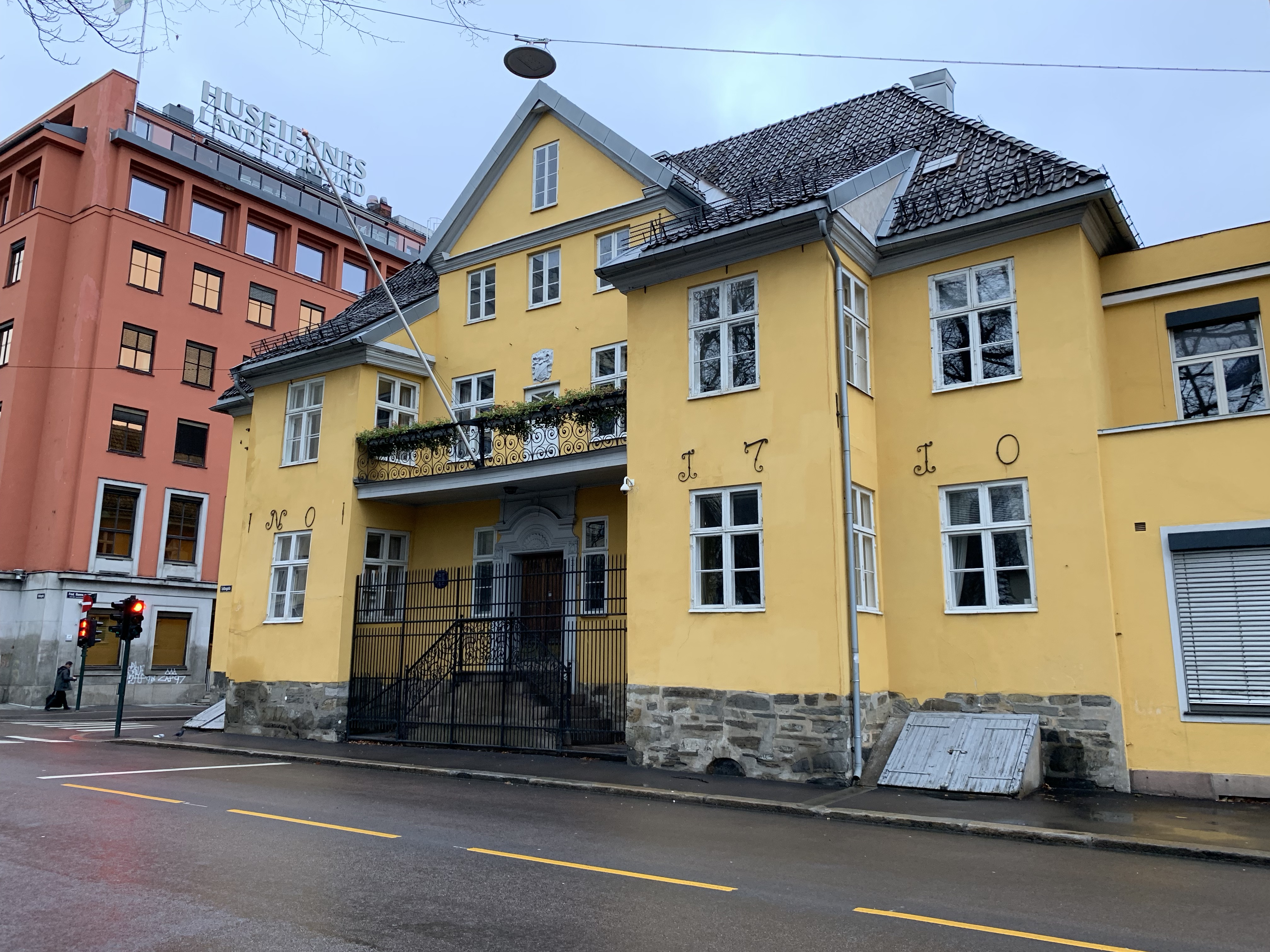
Treschowgården (Fred. Olsens gate 2) in Oslo

== Biography ==
He was born into a family of merchants on the island of Møn in south-eastern Denmark. After attending the University of Utrecht, he was appointed as a tax collector in Christiania (now Oslo) Norway in 1683. His business operations started in 1690, when he became the owner of a brickworks at Christiania. In time, he came to own six sawmills in Norderhov. He was a major exporter of lumber as well as the owner of a fleet of ships.

Between 1693 and 1694, Gerhard Treschow began to collaborate with Ole Bentsen (1653–1734) who had a 15-year royal charter to create a paper mill at Christiania. He had worked together with Dutch experts and machinery delivered from England. Export of paper started in 1696. In 1698, he demanded the forced sale of Bentsen's interests. That same year, Treschow took over the royal privileges of the paper mill. This would become the forerunner for the founding of Bentse Brug, Norway's first paper mill. He also owned Bjølsen sawmill at Akerselva. By 1697, he was co-owner of four major ships and by 1705 one of the larger shipowners in Christiania.

== Personal life ==
In 1688, he was married Karen Hansdatter Lemmich (1667–1727). In 1710, he was built his residence, Treschowgården, in Christiania where he died during 1719.

His son, Justus Gotthard Treschow, (1692–1730) took over management of his father's business interests. His daughter Catharine (1690–1727) married Johannes Trellund (1669–1735) who was Bishop of the Diocese of Viborg.

== See also ==
- Treschow (noble family)
