= Hans Gulbranson =

Norwegian businessman

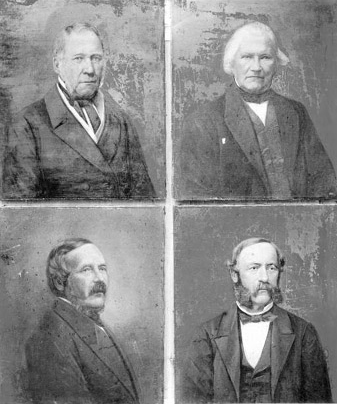
The founders of Nydalens Compagnie. Gulbranson on the top right.

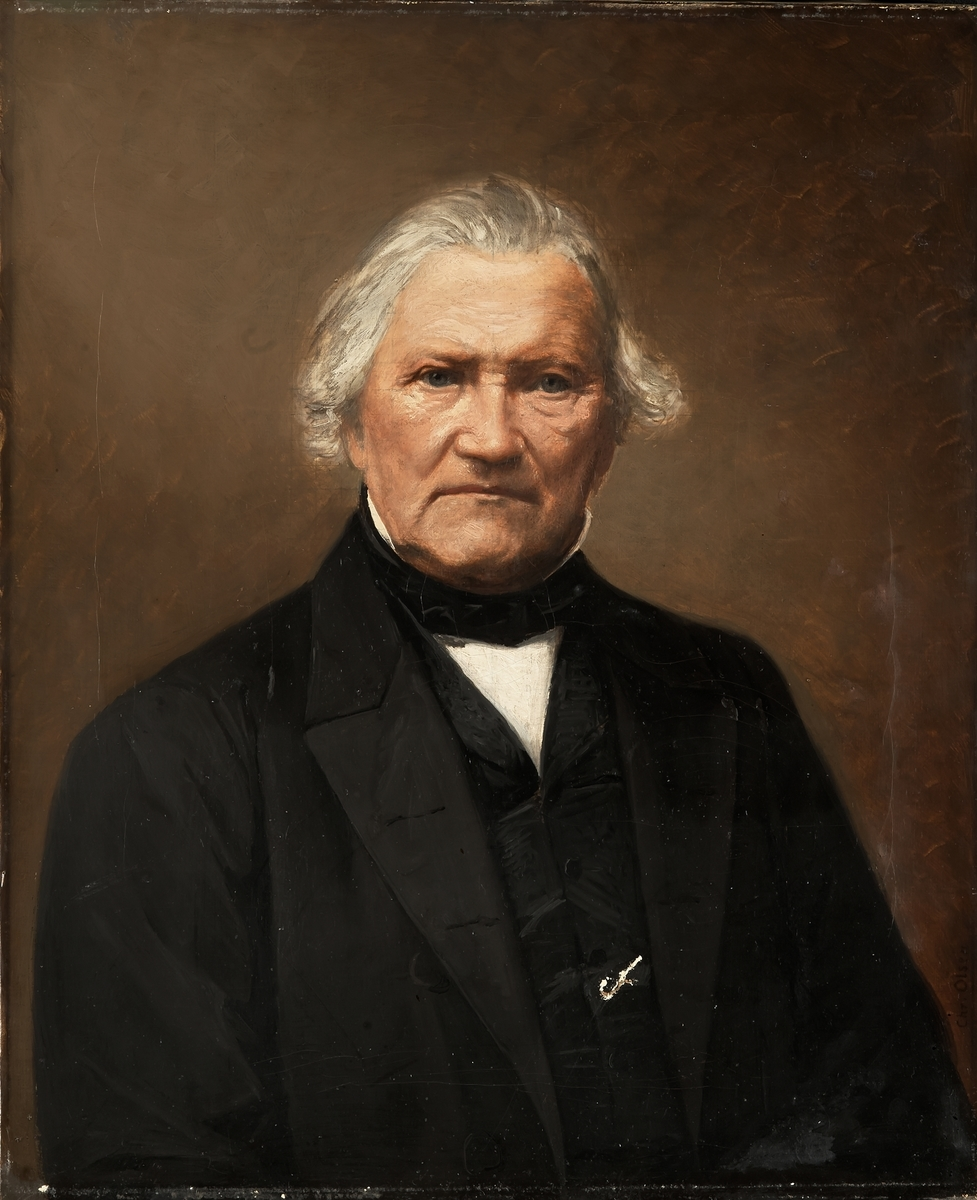
Hans Gulbranson; portrait by Christian Olsen

Hans Gulbranson (1787–1868) was a Norwegian businessperson. He was a pioneer in the development of textile industry in Norway in the mid-1800s.

Gulbranson was from Modum in Buskerud, Norway. He was a wholesaler in Christiania and was one of the wealthiest people in Norway's capital. He is best known as a founder of Nydalens Compagnie, one of the nation's first and largest textile manufacturing firms. Gulbranson founded the firm in 1845 together with Adam Hiorth, Ole Gjerdrum and Oluf N. Roll. Gulbranson was the company's first chairman and manager. He was succeeded by Peter J. K. Petersen in both positions, in 1868 and 1858 respectively. He also owned large areas of forest and sold timber. Together with Hiorth, Roll, Petersen and Iver Olsen he founded Christiania Mekaniske Væveri in 1847.

Together with his first wife Maren Bergithe Sparre (1796–1828) he had a daughter Claudine who married Jørgen Meinich. He had a son Carl August Gulbranson with his second wife Helene Andersen (1799-1855).

Business positions
| Preceded by position created | Manager of Nydalens Compagnie; 1845–1858 | Succeeded by Peter J. K. Petersen |
| Preceded by position created | Chairman of Nydalens Compagnie; 1845–1868 | Succeeded by Peter J. K. Petersen |
