= Knud Graah =

Danish-born Norwegian industrialist

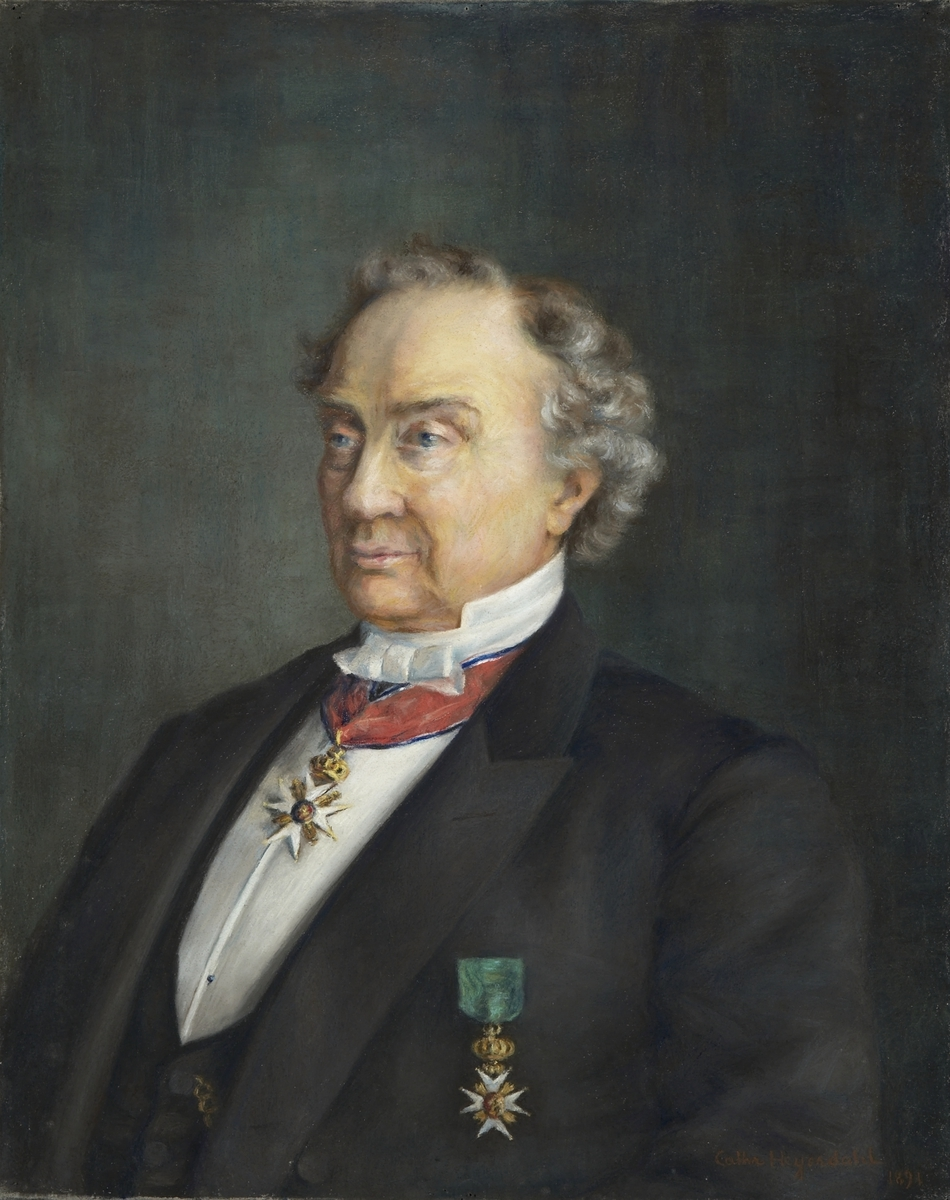
Portrait of Graah, 1891

Knud Graah (13 June 1817 – 27 March 1909) was a Danish born, Norwegian industrialist and pioneer in the Norwegian textile industry.

== Biography ==
Graah was born in Thisted, Denmark. He moved to Christiania (now Oslo) in 1833, where he first took employment with the trading firm of H. Gulbranson. In the 1840s he was on a trip to familiarize himself with the textile industry in the English textile centers of Lancashire and Manchester. In 1844, he founded Nedre Vøiens Bomuldsspinderie (later known as Knud Graah & Co A/S) to operate a cotton mill in the Oslo neighborhood of Nydalen. The plant was located near the river Akerselva, after Graah first bought waterfall rights of the river. Graah obtained textile machines and skilled workers for the operation of the new cotton mill from Great Britain.

Vøiens Bomuldsspinderi started production from 1846. From 1872 the company also operated a weavery. In the 1890s, the factory was expanded and modernized with electric power. It became one of the leading textile factories in Norway. Graah managed the factory for about sixty years.

== Personal life ==
He was decorated Commander, Second Class, of the Order of St. Olav, and Knight of the Swedish Order of Vasa.

He was married during 1857 to Helene Marie Conradi (1837-1866). His granddaughter Lille Graah was interned at and survived the Ravensbruck Concentration Camp during the German occupation of Norway.
