= Akerselvens Brugseierforening =

19th-century industrial association

Akerselvens Brugseierforening was an industrial association established in 1867 by factories located near Akerselva in Aker and Kristiania, Norway. Its first chairman, Jørgen Meinich, chaired for 25 years. In 1876, the association acquired the rights to exploit all water resources in Nordmarka. From 1885, the association cooperated with the municipality of Kristiania on water supply to the city. The association was dissolved in 1953.
