= Christian Schou =

Norwegian merchant, brewer and politician

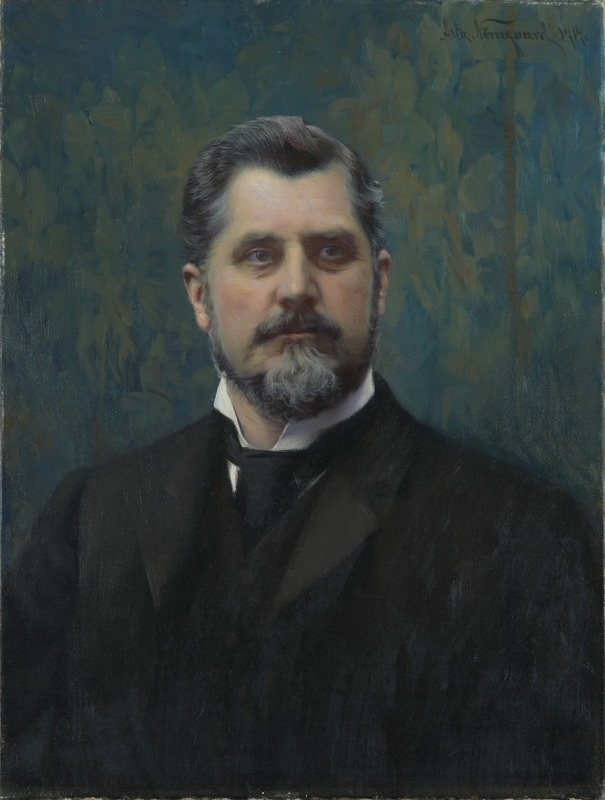
- Christian Schou portrayed by Asta Nørregaard
- Born: 13 December 1792; Christiania, Norway
- Died: 15 September 1874 (aged 81); Christiania, Norway
- Occupations: Merchant, brewer and politician
- Spouse: Birgitte Halvordine Ramm (1796–1877)
- Children: Halvor Schou (1823–1879)
- Awards: Order of St. Olav

Christian Schou (13 December 1792 – 15 September 1874) was a Norwegian merchant, brewer and politician.

== Biography ==
He was born in Christiania (now Oslo), Norway. He was the son of Didrik Hansen Schou (1744–1795) and Anna Ludovica Wittrog. His father died when he was quite young and he was raised by a relative. Schou established trading license at Christiania in 1822 and ran a farmer's shop at Grønland. He also operated a vinegar distillery and liquor store. In 1834, he acquired the Vestre Sinsen farm and ran a dairy. In 1837 he bought Jørgen Young's brewery in Fjerdingen, which he converted to Schou Brewery. Schou owned property along the Akerselva and utilized areas closest to the river for expansion of the brewery.

Schou became a member of the first presidency of Christiania in 1837. He was decorated Knight of the Order of St. Olav in 1872. He died during 1874 in Christiania. The square Schous plass in Oslo is named after him.

== Personal life ==
He was married in 1822 to Birgitte Halvordine Ramm (1796–1877), daughter of Major General Hans Henrich Ramm (1758-1827). Their daughter Hanna Christine Schou (1825–1867) was married to engineer and architect Oluf Nicolai Roll (1818–1906). Their son industrialist Halvor Schou (1823 – 1879) was the founder of the Hjula Væveri weaving mill in Oslo. His grandchildren included businessman Christian Julius Schou (1854–1909) and artist Olaf Fredrik Schou (1861–1925).
