= Esviken =

Villa in Asker, Norway

Coordinates: 59.8333°N 10.4856°E

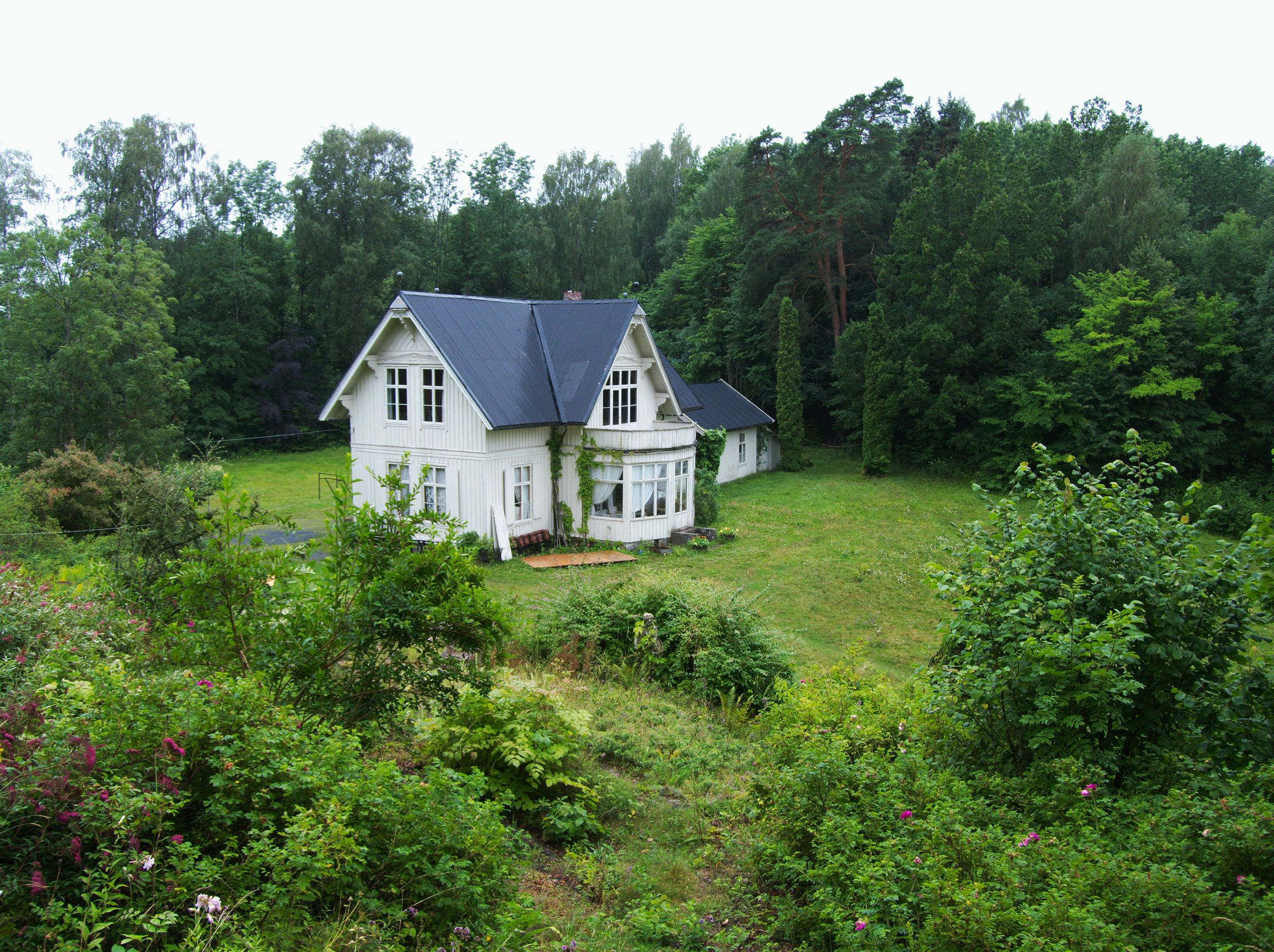
Esviken on Leangbukta

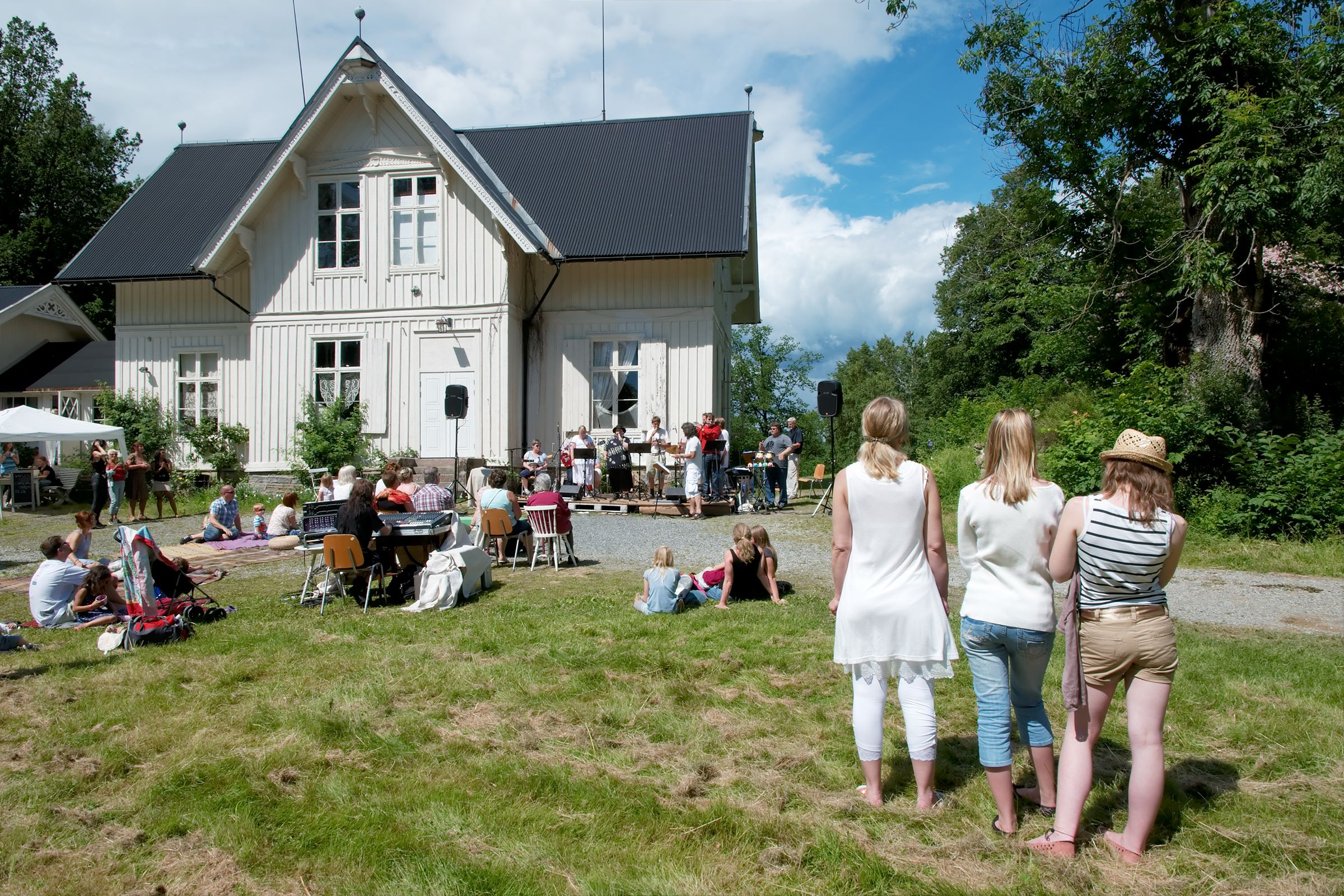
Esviken is now a protected cultural heritage site

Esviken (formerly Esvigen) is a villa surrounded by an elaborate garden. It is located on a former farm on Leangbukta bay between Vettre and Konglungen in Asker, Norway.

== History ==
Industrialist Halvor Schou (1823–1879) and his wife Anna Cecilie Crowe (1829–1914) bought Løkenes farm in the late 1860s. They commissioned the villa to be designed by noted architect Wilhelm von Hanno (1826–1882). Esviken was completed in 1872 and used by Schou and his heirs as a summer residence.

Their daughter Birgitte Halvordine Schou (1847-1923) was married to industrialist Einar Westye Egeberg (1851–1940). They inherited the villa and half of the surrounding property. Their daughter Hermine Egeberg (1881–1974) was married from 1901 to Count Peder Anker Wedel-Jarlsberg (1875-1954). Wedel-Jarlsberg was Lord Chamberlain for King Haakon VII of Norway from 1931 to 1945 and one of the King's closest confidants for over thirty year. Esviken is located close to Skaugum which was owned by the royal family. The King and Queen visited Esviken many times.

Formally, Hermine and Peder Anker Wedel-Jarlsberg took over the property in 1930, but in reality, this happened around thirty years earlier. The Wedel-Jarlsberg family extended the garden significantly. In 1960, the property was inherited by their daughter Hedevig Wedel-Jarlsberg (1913–1996), who married Per Christian Cornelius Paus (1910-1986), his wife's distant cousin and himself a descendant of the Schou family.

In 1996, their children Cornelia Paus, Christopher Paus and Peder Nicolas Paus inherited the property. The property was sold to Asker municipality in 1999. The villa and garden were listed as a protected cultural heritage site by the Norwegian Directorate for Cultural Heritage in 2006.
