= Shou =

Shou may refer to:

- Robin Shou (b. 1960), a Chinese American actor
- The Chinese character shou (寿/壽) that means "longevity"
- Shanghai Ocean University (SHOU), China
- Shou, the Chinese god of longevity, one of the Sanxing
- Shou County, a county in China
- Shō (given name), a masculine Japanese given name
- Shō (instrument), a Japanese instrument
- Shō, a traditional Japanese unit of volume equal to 1.8L
- Shou Ronpo, a character from Uchu Sentai Kyuranger
- Shou Tatsumi (巽 ショウ), a characters from Kyuukyuu Sentai GoGoFive
