= Skov =

Skov is the Danish word for forest.

== Surname ==
Skov
Origin
- Language: Danish
- Meaning: forest
- Region of origin: Danmark

- Art Skov (1928–2009), hockey referee
- Glen Skov (1931–2013), hockey player
- Kira Skov (born 1976), Danish singer
- Peter Skov-Jensen (born 1971), Danish former professional football player
- Rikke Skov (born 1980), Danish handball player
- Søren Skov (1954–2022), Danish former professional football player
- Shayne Skov (born 1990), American football player for college team Stanford Cardinal

== Place name ==
- Riis Skov
- Rold Skov
- Mollerup Skov
- Gribskov Municipality

== Fictional characters ==
- Freja Skov, a character in the video game Overwatch
