= Bradford Skow =

American philosopher

- Born: Newport Beach, CA

Education
- Education: Oberlin College (BA); University of Sydney (MA); New York University (PhD)

Philosophical work
- Era: 21st-century philosophy
- Region: Western philosophy
- Institutions: MIT
- Main interests: metaphysics, philosophy of science, aesthetics

Bradford Skow is an American philosopher and poet, and Laurance S. Rockefeller Professor of Philosophy at the Massachusetts Institute of Technology. He is known for his works on metaphysics, philosophy of science, and aesthetics.

== Books ==
- Objective Becoming, Oxford University Press, 2015, ISBN 978-0198713272.
- Reasons Why, Oxford University Press, 2016, ISBN 978-0198785842.
- Causation, Explanation, and the Metaphysics of Aspect, Oxford University Press, 2018, ISBN 978-0198826965.
- American Independence in Verse, Pentameter Press, 2025, ISBN 979-8999632715.
