= Lille Graah =

Norwegian journalist, radio announcer and reporter

- Born: Anne Knudsdatter Graah; 22 January 1908; Kristiania, Norway
- Died: 19 January 2001 (aged 92)
- Occupations: Journalist, radio announcer and reporter
- Relatives: Knud Graah (grandfather)
- Awards: Medal of St. Hallvard (1977)

Anne Knudsdatter "Lille" Graah (22 January 1908 – 19 January 2001) was a Norwegian journalist, radio announcer and reporter. She worked for the Norwegian Broadcasting Corporation for more than thirty years, and is particularly known from the popular radio program Ønskekonserten.

== Personal life ==
Graah was born in Kristiania as the daughter of Knud Andreas Graah (1866–1908) and nurse Marie Blehr. She was the granddaughter of industrialist Knud Graah.

== Career ==
Graah finished her secondary education in 1927, and then spent some years helping her mother who was running a children's pensionary in Eidsvoll. She then worked as a governess in Moscow. In Moscow she also studied theatre with Vsevolod Meyerhold at the Vakhtangov Theatre. From 1937 she was a journalist for the Oslo magazine Hallo-Hallo!, and worked for Norsk Lovtidend from 1940.

During World War II she was a member of an underground newspaper group and was arrested by the Gestapo in 1942. She was imprisoned at Grini, and sent to the Ravensbrück concentration camp in 1943.

From 1945 she worked for the Norwegian Broadcasting Corporation, as a radio program announcer. Among her responsibilities was the program Ønskekonserten, the most popular radio show in Norway ever. She worked for the Norwegian Broadcasting Corporation for more than thirty years, from 1961 as a reporter for the local chapter Østlandssendingen. She founded the organization Norsk-Tsjekkoslovakisk Hjelpeforening in 1948, helping refugees after the Czechoslovak coup d'état of 1948.

She received the Medal of St. Hallvard in 1977.
