= Agnes Hiorth =

Norwegian artist (1899–1984)

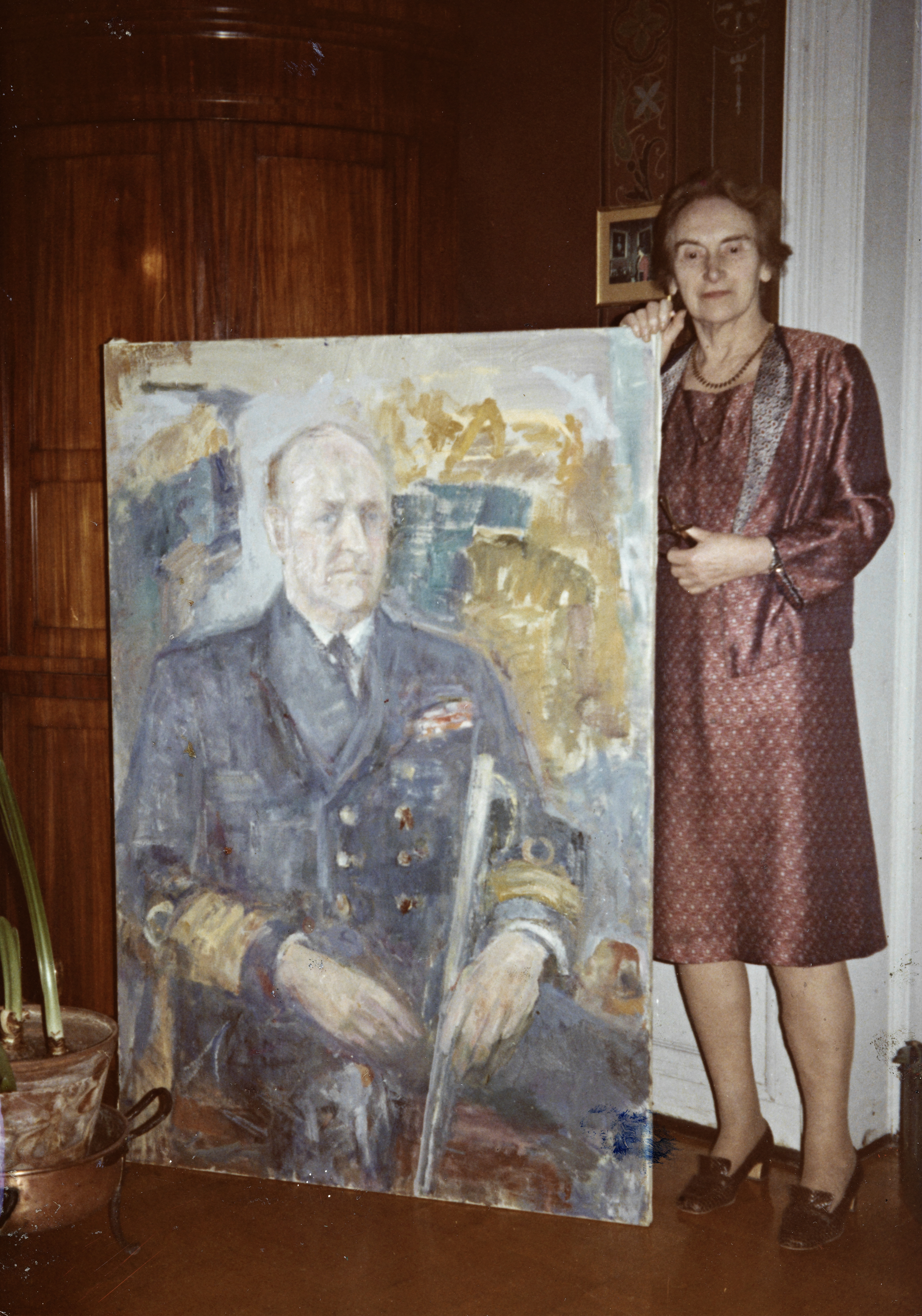
- Agnes Hiorth with her painting of King Olav V
- Born: 5 May 1899; Kristiania, Norway
- Died: 30 November 1984 (aged 85)
- Occupation: Painter

Agnes Hiorth (5 May 1899 – 30 November 1984) was a Norwegian painter. Her art was characterized by impressionistic broad brush and harmoniously palette of landscapes, as well as a wide range of cultivated and accurate portraits.

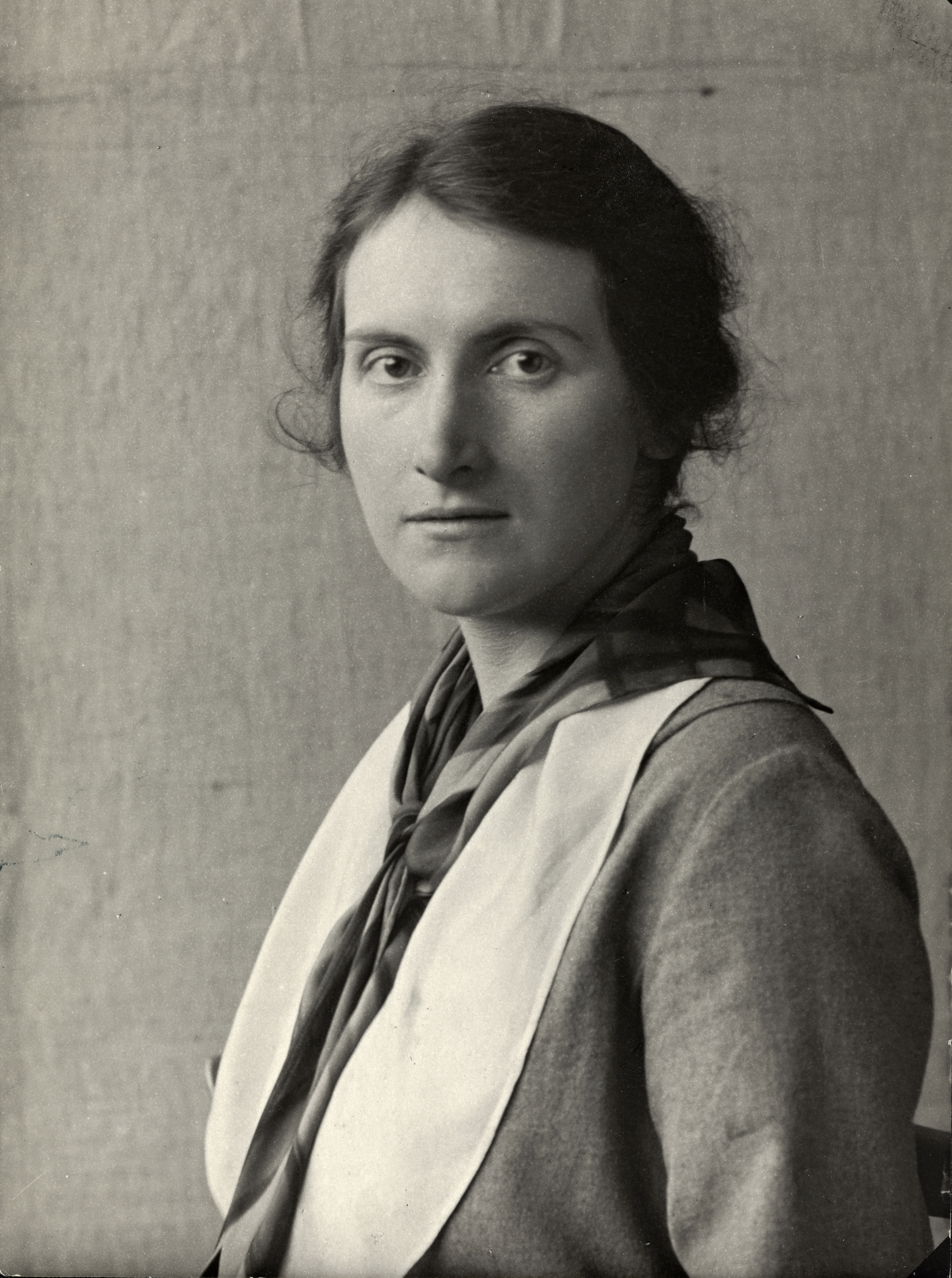
Agnes Hiorth as a young woman, courtesy of the National Library of Norway

== Biography ==
Agnes Hiorth was born in Kristiania (now Oslo). She was the daughter of Adam Severin Hiorth (1864–1949) and Alice Mitchell Homan (1863–1953). She began her artistic training as a student of the painter Harald Brun. She debuted at the National Autumn Exhibition in 1922. She also studied with the painters Pola Gauguin (1918–1920), Axel Revold (1925–1926), and Georg Jacobsen (1935–1936). She painted numerous portraits, and among her best-known works are portraits of royal family members. Her portrait of King Haakon VII is in Oslo City Hall, and of King Olav V in Oslo Militære Samfund. The National Gallery of Norway owns eight of her works, including a self-portrait, portraits, and landscapes. She is also represented at the Bergen Art Museum and the Lillehammer Art Museum.
