= Schouw =

Schouw is a surname. Notable persons with that name include:

- Gerard Schouw (born 1965), Dutch politician
- Joakim Frederik Schouw (1789–1852), Danish lawyer, botanist and politician
