= Some Kind of Wonderful =

Some Kind of Wonderful or Some Kinda Wonderful may refer to:

== Songs ==
- "Some Kind of Wonderful" (The Drifters song), 1961, written by Gerry Goffin and Carole King
- "Some Kind of Wonderful" (Soul Brothers Six song), 1967; covered by Grand Funk Railroad in 1974
- "Some Kind of Wonderful", by Reflection Eternal from Train of Thought, 2000
- "Some Kinda Wonderful", by Betty Who from The Valley, 2017
- "Some Kinda Wonderful", by Sky, 1998

== Other uses ==
- Some Kind of Wonderful (film), a 1987 film directed by Howard Deutch
- SomeKindaWonderful, an American rock band
