= Skou =

Skou may be,

- Skou language (also known as Sekol, Sekou, Sko, Skouw, Skow, Sukou, or Tumawo (Te Mawo)), is a Papuan language of Indonesia
  - Skou languages, a small language family spoken by about 7000 people, mainly along the Vanimo coast of Sandaun Province in Papua New Guinea

== People ==
- Erik Skou (1917–1984), Danish swimmer
- Jens Christian Skou (1918–2018), Danish biochemist and Nobel laureate
- Per Skou (1891–1962), Norwegian footballer, sports official and businessperson
- Søren Skou (born 1964), Danish businessman
- Sophia Skou (born 1975), Danish swimmer
- Tage Skou-Hansen (1925–2015), Danish writer, editor and scholar
- Ulla Skou or Ulla Poulsen (1905–2001), formerly Baroness Ulla Rosenørn-Lehn, Danish balerina and actress
