= Hjula Væverier =

Norwegian textile company

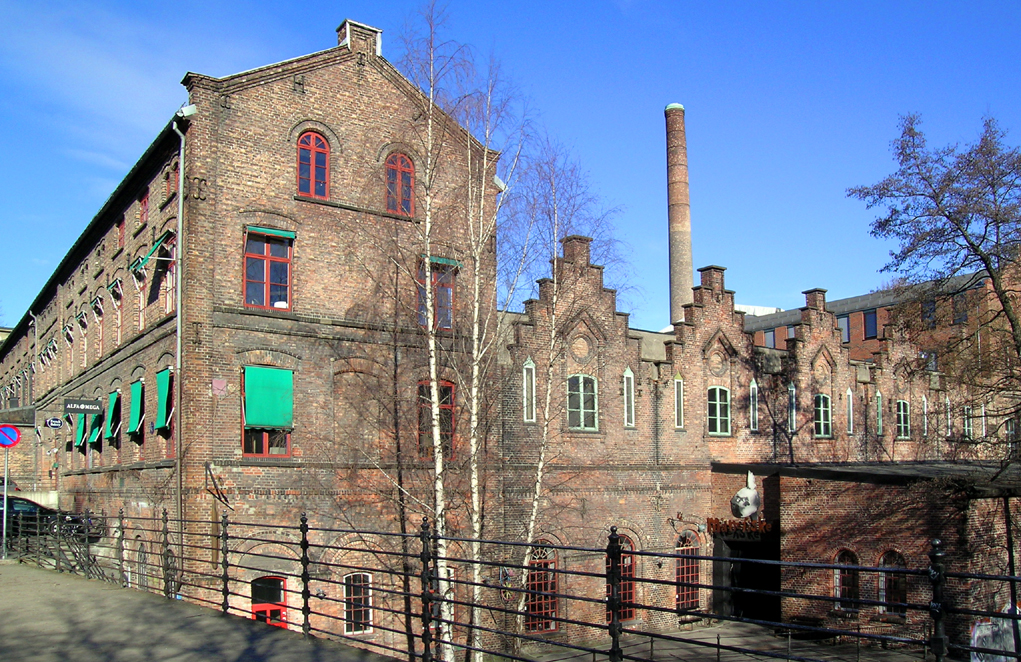
Hjula Væverier, established by Halvor Schou

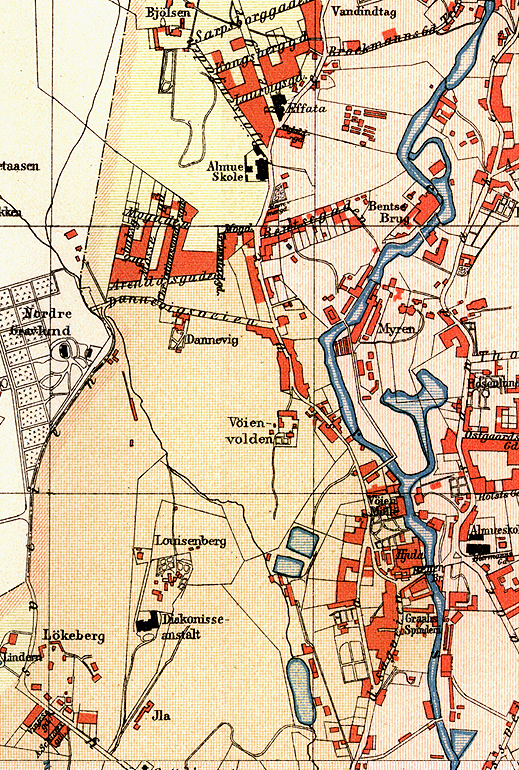
Map of Sagene, 1887. Hjula is located near the bottom, although north of Graahs Spinderi.

Hjula Væverier was a company based in Oslo, Norway. It was one of oldest modern industrial companies in Norway.

It was established as a weaving mill in 1855 by industrialist Halvor Schou (1823-1879) who had previously operated a mill further down the river in the Brenneriveien. The mill utilized water power from the Hjulafossen on the Akerselva at Sagene. The plant was designed by architect Oluf Nicolai Roll (1818–1906).

In the 1880s it was the largest textile company in Norway, with a total of about 800 employees. It also had production facilities in Lillestrøm and Fredrikstad. The company closed operation in 1957.

== In fiction ==
Novelist and playwright Oskar Braaten (1881-1939) featured working-class life at the mill, most notably in Kring fabrikken (1910).
