= Schou Brewery =

Norwegian brewery

Coordinates: 59°55′8.2056″N 10°45′37.710″E

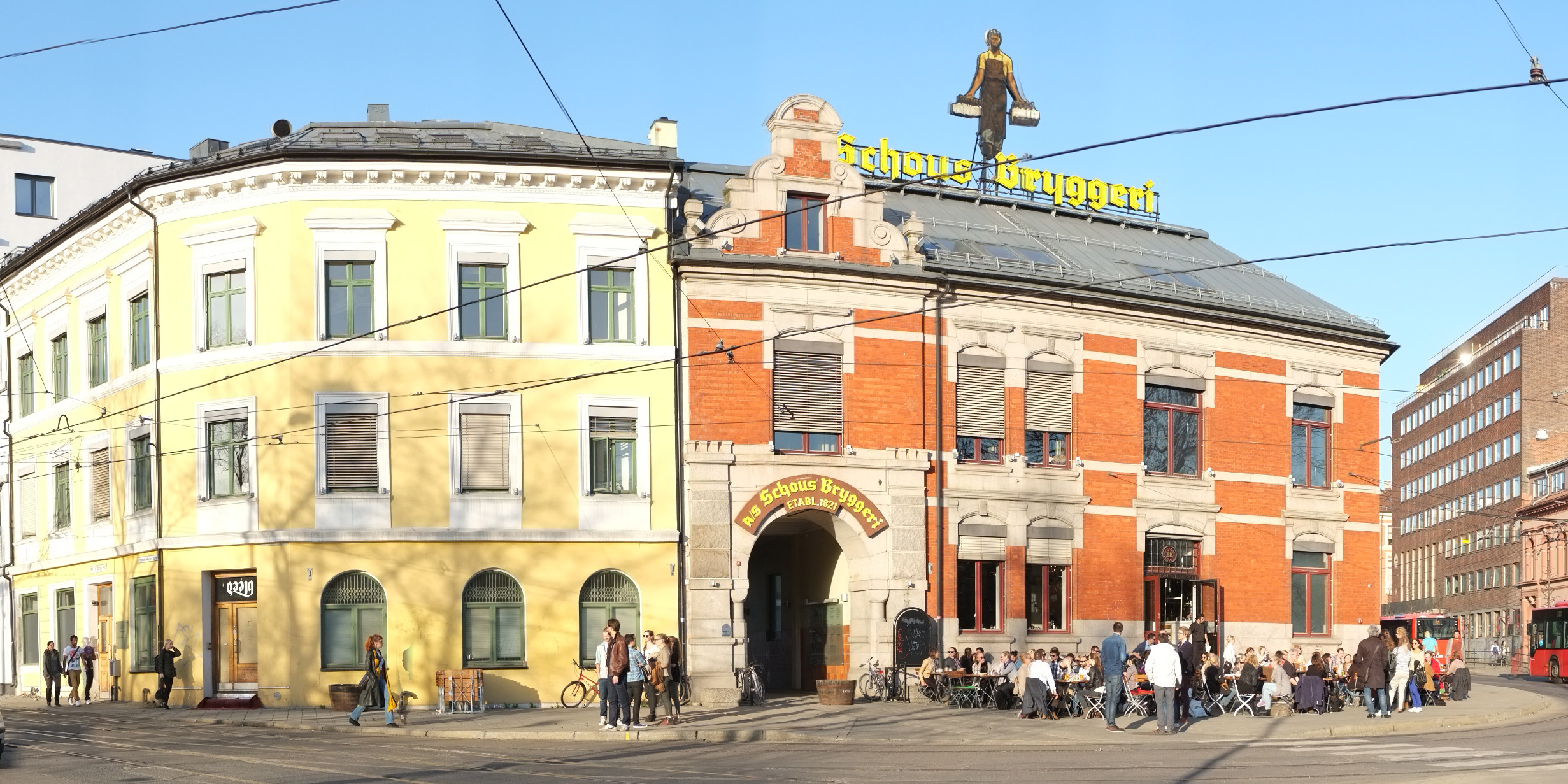
The Schou Brewery in 2012

The Schou Brewery (Norwegian: Schous Bryggeri) is a former Norwegian brewery.

== History ==
The company originated in a brewery that Johannes Thrane founded around 1800. Jørgen Young owned the brewery for some time before it was purchased by Christian Julius Schou (1792–1874) in 1837. The brewery was operated at several different locations in Oslo, and in 1873 operations were moved to a new facility at the Schousløkken property at Trondheimsveien (Trondheim Street) no. 2. The Schou Brewery took over the Foss Brewery in 1917, when the Foss Brewery was unable to receive raw materials from Germany during the First World War. In 1962, the Schou Brewery merged with Frydenlund Breweries to create the Merged Breweries Company (Norwegian: De Sammensluttede Bryggerier A/S). That company operated until 1977 as the Frydenlund Schou Brewery (Norwegian: Frydenlund Schous Bryggeri). In 1977 the company was taken over by Nora Industries (Norwegian: Nora Industrier), which also owned the Ringnes brewery and Nora Mineral Water (Norwegian: Nora Mineralvann). The Schou Brewery was Norway's oldest brewery when it shut down in 1981.

== The Schou Brewery today ==
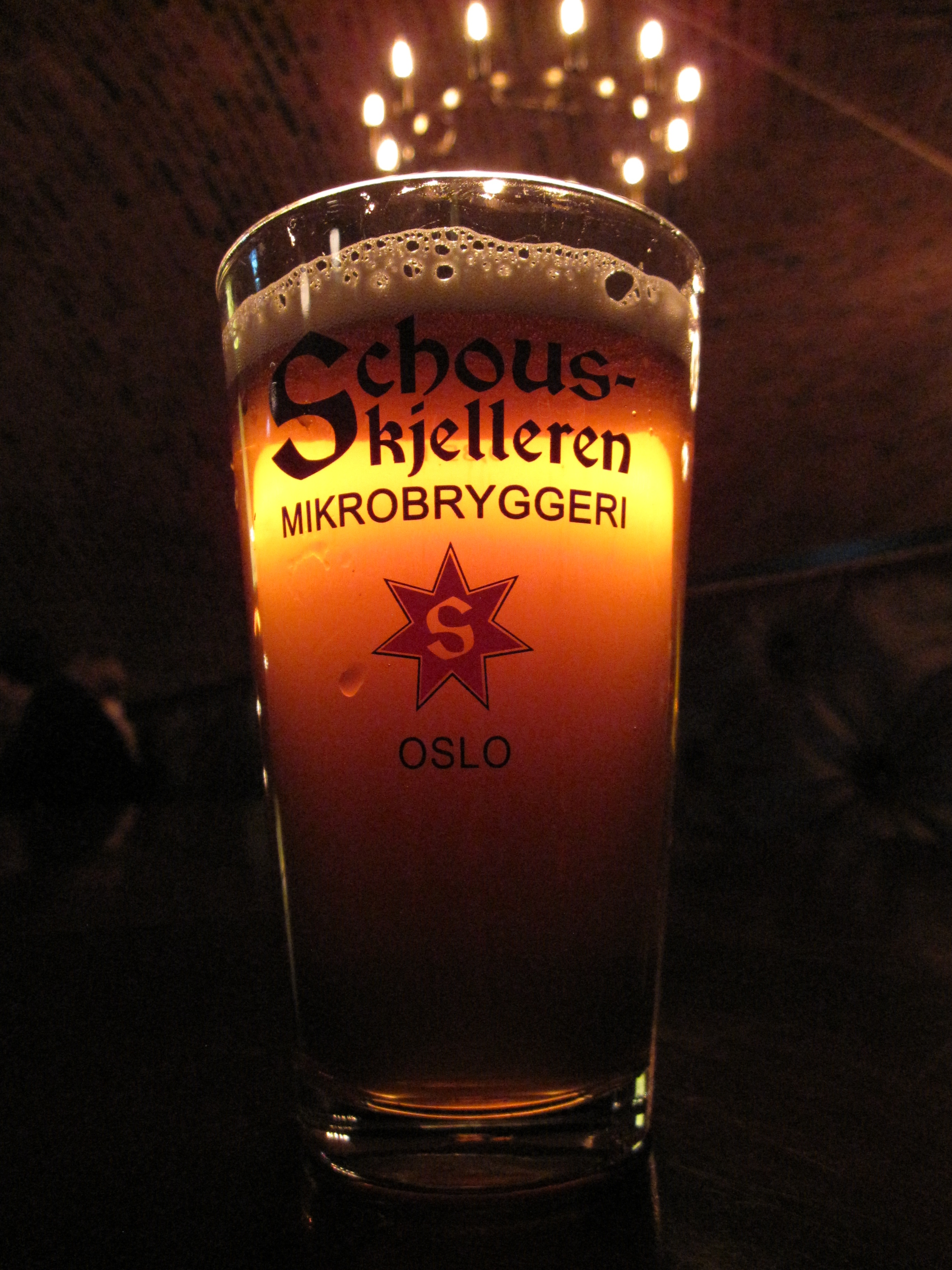
Beer from Schouskjelleren Mikrobryggeri

The neighborhood where the brewery was located is largely protected by the Urban Conservation Office, which has resulted in good conservation of major parts of the original brewery. The area is dominated by large brick industrial buildings from the last century, combined with newer modern premises. Until 2005, BI Norwegian Business School was a major tenant of the property, with the Norwegian School of Marketing (Norges Markedshøyskole) centrally located in the neighborhood. Several municipal businesses have office space in the area, including Oslo Water and Sewerage and the Real Estate and Urban Renewal Office. The brewery building is owned by the insurance company KLP. Since 2010, the Schou Cellar Microbrewery (Schouskjelleren Mikrobryggeri) has operated in the property's basement. Schous Pils is still brewed, but on a small scale by Ringnes Brewery and sold at some pubs and bars in Oslo.

== Culture ==
For a long time, the municipality of Oslo sought to establish a "culture district" in Oslo in order to provide a gathering place for cultural activities. During the process of choosing a venue for a rock music museum, gradually both cultural and political forces agreed on the Schou neighborhood as a suitable place. In the end, Namsos was chosen as the site of the rock music museum, but private initiatives are underway to start a private museum in the Schou Brewery building.

In addition to an experience center for Norwegian rock, several other music-related ideas are planned for the brewery area. The municipality would like to use the brewery's former wort building (Vørterhuset) for training rooms designed for bands and solo performers. Another venue for musicians is Shou Corner (Schous Corner), a tavern that has featured live music all year long for a number of years. The Schou Corner building has protected status, but due to major subsidence damage to the structure there are plans to raze it and rebuild on a better foundation, and to continue the tavern business there. A private music school is under construction, and the music business Imerslund Musikk has opened a new shop in the oldest building in the neighborhood.

The Schou Cultural Brewery (Schous kulturbryggeri) is a large cultural venue in Oslo that transforms parts of the former Schou Brewery into a living cultural district. Five projects are located here:

- The Pop Center (Popsenteret), an interactive museum for Norwegian popular music
- The Practice Hotel (Øvingshotellet), with fifty rehearsal rooms for bands, soloists, and choirs
- The National Stage (Riksscene), for Norwegian and international folk music, joik, and folk dancing
- The Culture Station (Kulturstasjon), with dance, theater, and visual arts for children and young people

The state is responsible for the National Stage for folk dance and folk music. The municipality of Oslo is responsible for the other three projects. There is a widespread use of common functions, making the Schou Cultural Brewery a major cultural institution. Parts of the activity take place in the old brewery buildings, and a modern new building will also be built in the rear courtyard.

The Schou Cultural Brewery was set up as a project in the Culture and Sports Center (Kultur- og idrettsetaten), led by a steering committee appointed by the Oslo City Council. The Practice Hotel and the Culture Station were opened 2008, and the rest of the Schou Cultural Brewery was completed in 2009.
