= Halvor Schou =

Norwegian industrialist and founder of Hjula Væveri

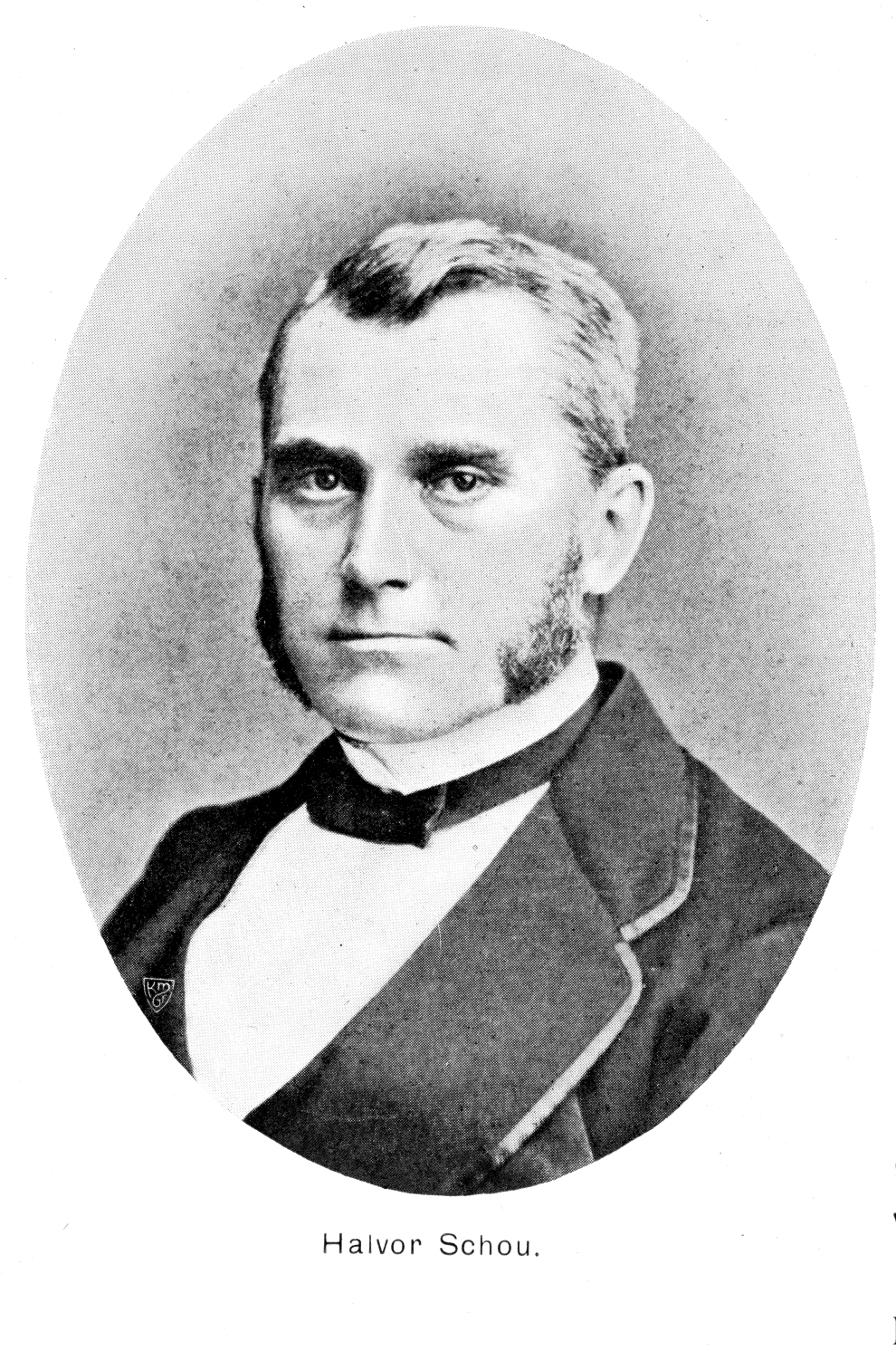
Halvor Arntzen Schou

Halvor Arntzen Schou (11 May 1823 – 5 February 1879) was a Norwegian industrialist. He was the founder of the Hjula Væveri weaving mill in Oslo.

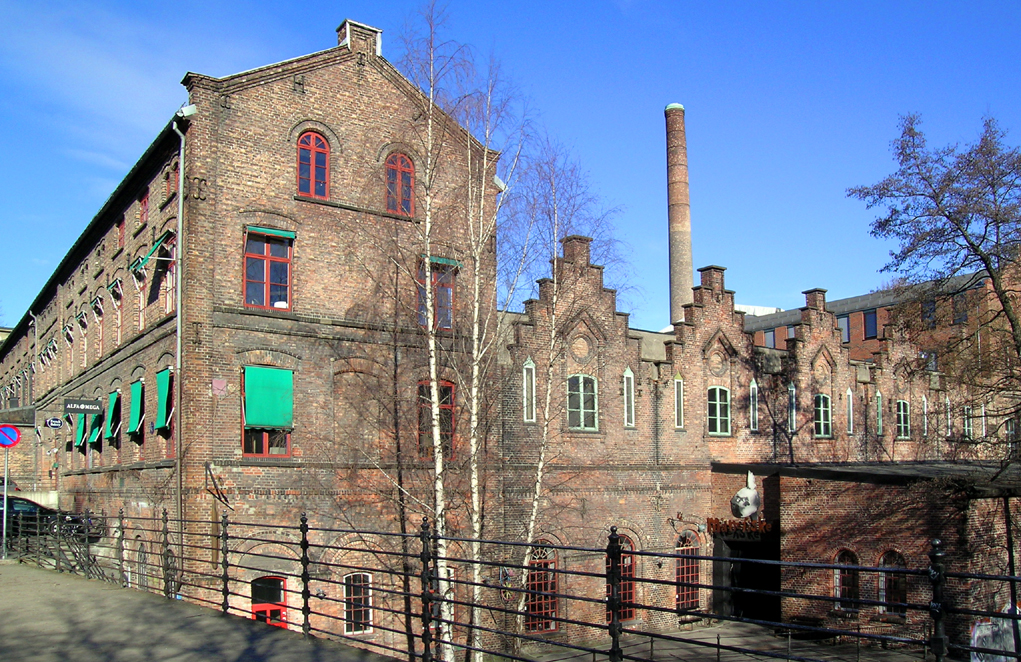
Hjula Væverier at Hjulafossen on the Akerselva in Oslo

== Biography ==
Halvor Schou was born in Christiania (now Oslo, Norway). He was a son of Christian Schou (1792–1874) and Birgitte Halvordine Ramm (1796–1877). His father established Schous Brewery (Schous bryggeri) in 1837. He attended Oslo Cathedral School and later traveled to Lübeck to attend a trade school. He returned in 1842 and first worked for the Schou Brewery. When his father died in 1874, he took over operation of the brewery.

By 1841, the United Kingdom began exporting steam engines and weaving machines. Schou founded the weaving mill Hjula Væveri (built from 1854 to 1856), which exploited the waterfall Hjulafossen on the Akerselva. Schou built the mill into one of the country's largest textile industries, becoming one of the country's largest industry leaders.

== Personal life ==
Schou was married in 1852 to Anna Cecilie Crowe (1829–1914). At the end of the 1860s, the couple established residence at Løkenes outside Vettre in Asker. They were the parents of courtier Marie Magdalena Rustad, businessman Christian Julius Schou (1854–1909) and artist Olaf Fredrik Schou (1861–1925), as well as grandparents of Christian Schou (1888–1955). Both the Schous Brewery and Hjula Væveri were later passed on to the next generation.

Schou was decorated Commander, First Class of the Order of St. Olav in 1877. He was a Knight of the Swedish Order of the Polar Star, and of the Danish Order of Dannebrog. Following his death in 1879, he was buried at Vår Frelsers gravlund in Oslo.

== See also ==
- Esviken
