= Nydalens Compagnie =

Norwegian textile and real estate company

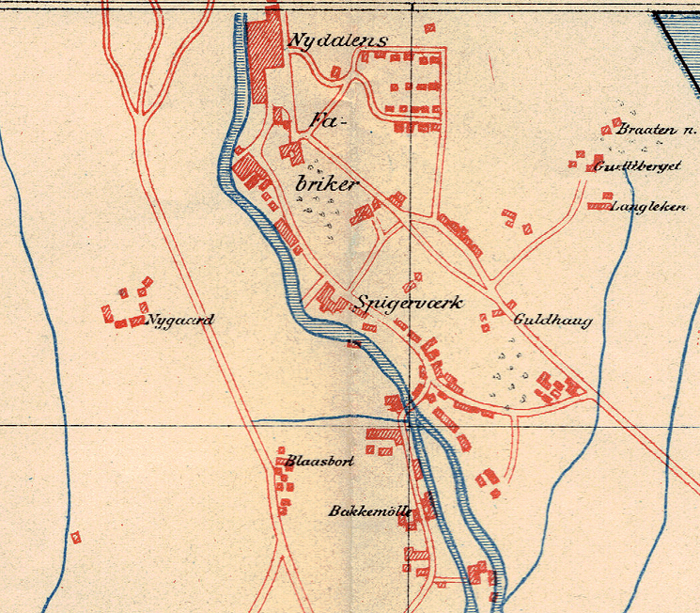
A 1900 map of the Nydalen area, with "Nydalens Fabriker" being geographically preeminent.

Nydalens Compagnie was a company in Nydalen, Oslo, Norway. It was founded in 1845 as a textile manufacturer, and from 1963 to 1998 it was a real estate company.

== History ==
It was founded in 1845 by Adam Hiorth, Ole Gjerdrum, Hans Gulbranson and Oluf N. Roll as Nydalens Bomuldsspinderi. The name was changed in 1867, when it also became a limited company. It was listed on Oslo Stock Exchange in 1942.

The year 1845 has been called the starting point of early industrialization in Norway. This is because of the founding of Nydalens Compagnie, and in addition the factory Vøiens Bomuldsspinderi was being built. The textile manufacturing at Nydalens Compagnie began in 1847, and between the 1890s and the 1940s Nydalens Compagnie was the largest textile company in the country with about 1100 employees. The production workers were mainly women and children, with a few men as supervisors and maintenance workers.

The company adopted a system of industrial paternalism, offering houses for the employees and social institutions, including a primary school for children. The children typically started working at the factory at the age of nine, normally spending half the day at work and the other half at school. Factory manager Otto Gjerdrum founded a youth club and a ski club, and organized Christmas Balls at the school.

Textile production ceased in 1963, whereupon Nydalens Compagnie continued as a real estate company. In 1992 it incorporated Bergen-based Investa Eiendom, and had headquarters in Bergen for one year. It was sold to Anders Wilhelmsen & Co in 1993 and moved back to Oslo. It was incorporated into another real estate company owned by Anders Wilhelmsen & Co, Linstow, in 1998. The former textile production facilities, "Nydalen Park", had already in 1996 been sold to the estate Avantor.
