= Myrens Verksted =

Industrial area in Norway

Coordinates: 59°56′5.1468″N 10°45′31.07″E

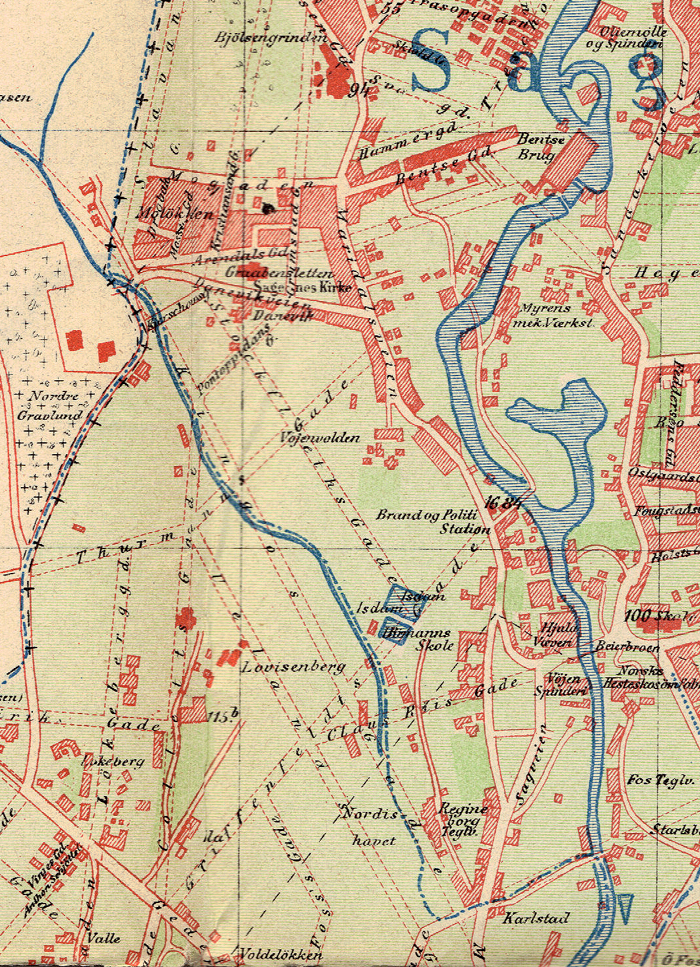
Map of Sagene c.1900, with Myrens Mek. Verksted near the river.

Myrens Verksted is an industrial area in Norway on the east side of the Akerselva river, situated between the bridges Bentsebrua and Vøyenbrua in the southwest part of Torshov, in what is today the Sagene Borough of Oslo. Production started in this area in 1854 based on Øvre Foss Mekaniske verksted established in 1848 by the brothers Jens and Andreas Jensen. In 1855, their brother-in-law Knut Dahl joined as partner. Their main production focused on industrial machinery and tools for rolling mills and sawmills, utilizing the river as source for power in the production.

Myrens Verksted became one of the leading and largest industrial companies in Norway with more than 1,000 employees in 1909. The company was acquired by Kværner Brug (now a part of Aker ASA) in 1928. The production naturally developed into supplying the pulp and paper industry. At one point, 85% of their production was exported.

Industrial production was terminated in 1988 and moved to the Kværner Eureka location in Lier. The area and its building were sold to what is now Myren Eiendom, and developed into a small cluster for knowledge-based businesses in broadcasting, television production and advertising. The area also contains several apartment buildings.
