= Nedre Vøiens Bomuldsspinderie =

Norwegian textile company

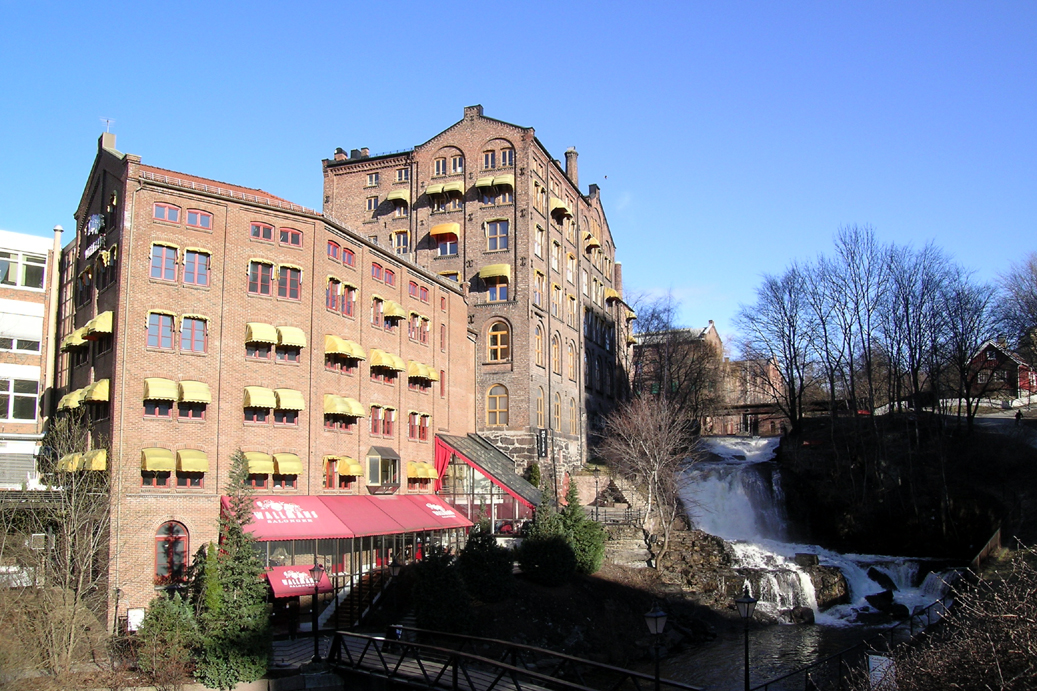
Nedre Vøiens Bomuldsspinderi

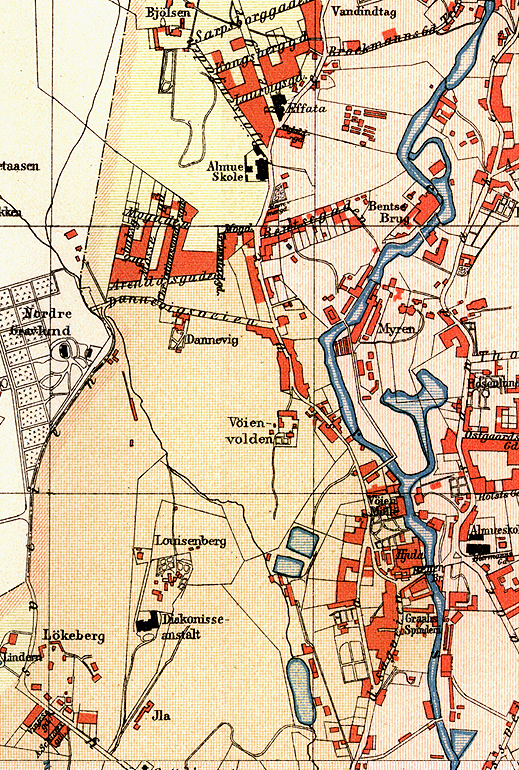
1887 map of Sagene, "Graahs Spinderi" near the bottom.

Nedre Vøiens Bomuldsspinderie was a textile manufacturing company in Oslo, Norway. It has also been called Vøiens Bomuldsspinderie or variants thereof, as well as Graahs Spinderi and Knud Graah & Co after the owner.

In 1844 Knud Graah bought the rights to a part of Akerselva near the farm Nedre Vøien, together with his brother-in-law Niels O. Young. In 1845 he travelled to Manchester to buy machinery and recruit skilled employees to a textile factory. The building of the factory started in 1845, and the spinnery was operational from 1846. From 1872 the company also operated a weavery.

In 1906 the company changed its name to Knud Graah & Co, and became a limited company. The spinnery operations were demerged from Knud Graah & Co in 1919, and managed by an independent company. The old name Vøiens Bomuldsspinderie was used for this company, but it went defunct in 1923.

The weavery operations of Knud Graah & Co continued. In 1946 it was merged with companies such as Hjula Veveri and moved upstream to Frysja. The new company was named TEFAS, but it went bankrupt in 1955. Knud Graah & Co existed a few years as a wholesaling and real estate company.
