= Arthur Knagenhjelm =

Norwegian barrister

Arthur Sophus Nicolay Knagenhjelm (19 June 1866 – 1938) was a Norwegian barrister.

== Personal life ==
He was born in Trondhjem as the son of Ludvig Wiese Knagenhjelm (1824–1907) and Selma Angelique Lousie Roll. The Knagenhjelm family had resided in Sogndal Municipality in recent times, and had been ennobled in 1721, then under the name Knagenhielm. He was a brother of Lord Chamberlain Jacob Roll Knagenhjelm. On the maternal side he was a grandson of mayor Jacob Roll and nephew of Oluf Nicolai Roll, Karl Jacob Roll and Ferdinand Nicolai Roll.

He was married to Barbara Ihlen, a daughter of Jacob Thurmann Ihlen and Belgian citizen Ambrosine Pauline Rouquet; and also a first cousin of industrialists Nils, Joakim and Alf Ihlen. He was a brother-in-law of Celina Ihlen, who was married to Christian Pierre Mathiesen.

Arthur and Barbara had the son Kai Knagenhjelm, a high-ranking bureaucrat who married into the Sverdrup Fearnley family.

== Career ==
He finished his secondary education in 1884, and graduated with the cand.jur. degree in 1889. He was a deputy judge from 1889 to 1891, then a junior solicitor from 1892 to 1895, working in the Office of the Attorney General of Norway. From 1895 he was a barrister with the right to work with Supreme Court cases.

He chaired Kykkelsrudanlegget from 1899 to 1928 and Porsgrunds Elektrometallurgiske from 1918. He was a board member of Glommens Brukseierforening from 1903, Salomons Skofabrik from 1904, Labro Træsliberi from 1906 to 1918, Hafslund from 1916 to 1922, Freia Chocolade Fabrik from 1916, Odda Smelteverk from 1924; and a supervisory council member of Filharmonisk Selskap.

He was the president of Alliance française in Norway from 1904 to 1920, and later an honorary member. He was also decorated as a Commandeur of the Legion of Honour and as an Officier d'Instruction Publique. He died in 1938 and was buried in Vestre gravlund.
