= Jacob Roll Knagenhjelm =

Jacob Roll Knagenhjelm (1858 – 1932) was the Lord Chamberlain of King Haakon VII of Norway from 1925 to 1931 and a member of the Norwegian nobility.

== Personal life ==
He was born in Trondhjem as the son of Ludvig Wiese Knagenhjelm (1824–1907) and Selma Angelique Lousie Roll.

He was an uncle of Kai Knagenhjelm and brother of Arthur Knagenhjelm. The Knagenhjelm family had resided in Sogndal Municipality in recent times, and had been ennobled in 1721, then under the name Knagenhielm. On the maternal side he was a grandson of mayor Jacob Roll and nephew of Oluf Nicolai Roll, Karl Jacob Roll and Ferdinand Nicolai Roll. His sister-in-law Barbara Ihlen was a daughter of Jacob Thurmann Ihlen.

== Career ==
He finished his secondary education, graduated with the cand.jur. degree and worked abroad for many years. Returning to Norway he was hired in the Ministry of the Interior. He moved to the Ministry of Agriculture in 1900, and also became a chamberlain in the royal court of Oscar II. He was promoted to secretary for the Lord Chamberlain in 1903 and court marshal in 1923, and from 1925 to 1931 he was the Lord Chamberlain for the new King Haakon VII.

He was decorated as a Commander of the Order of St. Olav. He died in 1932.

Preceded by Fritz Rustad	Lord Chamberlain of Norway; 1925–1931	Succeeded by Peder Anker Wedel Jarlsberg
