= Kai Knagenhjelm =

Norwegian civil servant

Kai Ludvig Jakob Knagenhjelm (28 August 1898 – 30 May 1987) was a Norwegian civil servant.

== Personal life ==
He was born in Trondhjem as a son of barrister Arthur Knagenhjelm (1866–1938) and Barbara Ihlen (1870–1953). On the maternal side he was a grandson of Jacob Thurmann Ihlen and Belgian citizen Ambrosine Pauline Rouquet.

On the paternal side he was a nephew of Lord Chamberlain Jacob Roll Knagenhjelm. The Knagenhjelm family had resided in Sogndal Municipality in recent times, and had been ennobled in 1721, then under the name Knagenhielm. Through his grandmother Selma Angelique Lousie Roll he was a great-grandson of mayor Jacob Roll and grandnephew of Oluf Nicolai Roll, Karl Jacob Roll and Ferdinand Nicolai Roll.

In June 1946 in Stockholm he married Ragnhild Sverdrup Fearnley, born 1916. She was a daughter of Ragnhild Sverdrup, who was a second cousin of Otto Sverdrup.

== Career ==
He finished his secondary education in 1916, and graduated with the cand.jur. degree in 1922. He was a deputy judge from 1922 to 1924, then a junior solicitor from 1925 to 1928. He was hired in the Ministry of Finance in 1930, and advanced to assistant secretary in 1934. In 1940 he was hired in the Ministry of Provisioning. He became deputy under-secretary of state in the Ministry of Local Government in 1945, and served as the highest-ranking civil servant in the ministry, permanent under-secretary of state, from 1966 to 1968.

He chaired Salomons Skofabrik and was a supervisory council member of Hafslund and Andresens Bank. He died in May 1987 and was buried in Vestre gravlund.

Civic offices
| Preceded by Erling Anger (acting) | Permanent under-secretary of state in the Ministry of Local Government; 1966–1968 | Succeeded by Berger Ulsaker |
