= Fritz Rustad =

Norwegian civil and royal servant

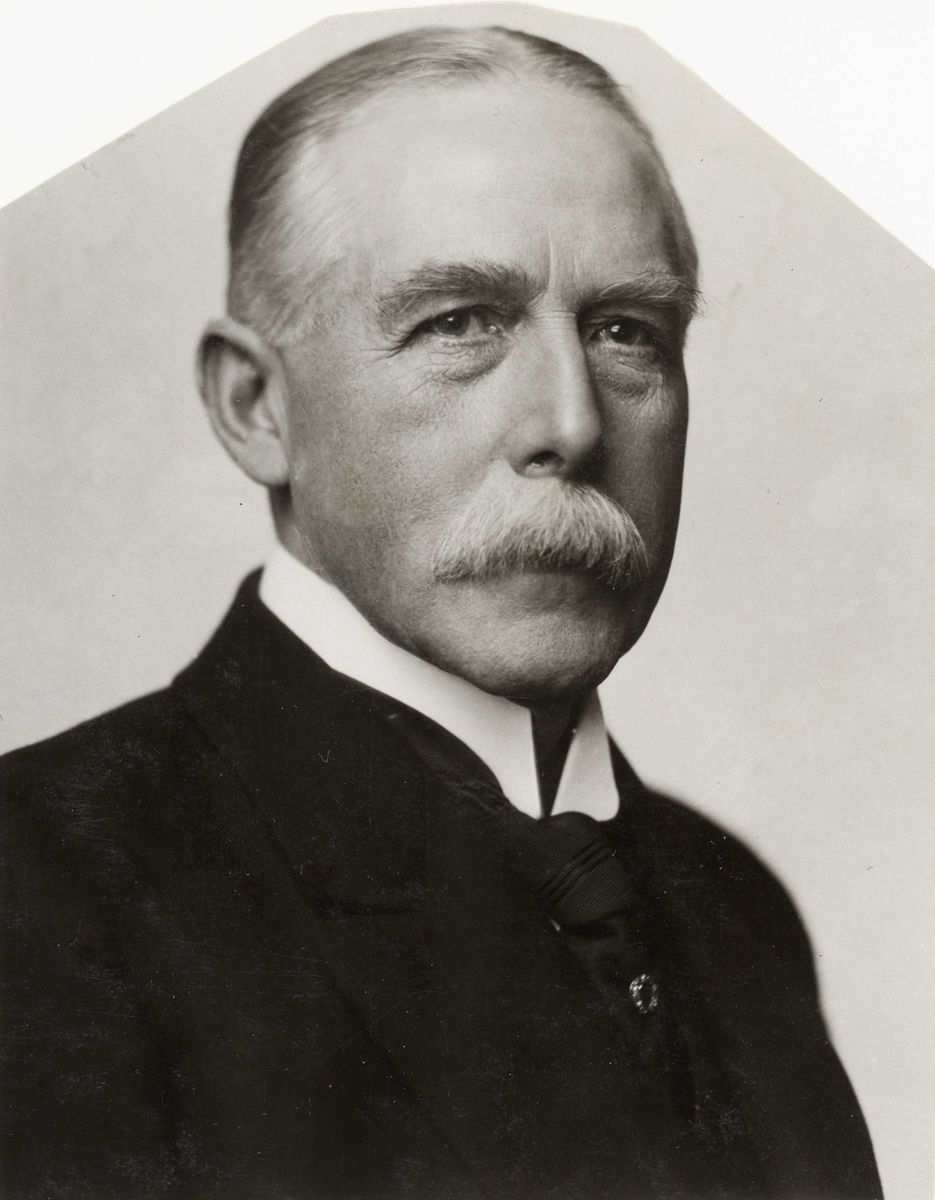
Fritz Rustad.

Fredrik "Fritz" Frantz Michael Wilhelm Rustad (19 July 1852 – 9 October 1930) was a Norwegian civil and royal servant.

He was born in Kristiania as a son of chamberlain Carl Emil Rustad and Henriette Benedicte Løvenskiold. In April 1880 in Sinsen he married Marie Magdalene Schou (1859–1943), a daughter of Halvor Schou. Their son Carl Rustad became a military officer and company director, and married a sister of Jean Heiberg. Their daughter Elisabeth Rustad (1883–1966) married the later Lord Chamberlain Peter Fredrik Broch in 1905, and their daughter Benedicte Rustad (1886–1976) married ship-owner Thomas Fearnley in August 1911.

He finished his secondary education at Nissen School in 1868, and took the cand.jur. in 1873. He was hired in the Ministry of the Interior in 1873, and was promoted to assistant secretary in 1886. He became a servant at the royal court from January 1899. He had been kammerjunker since 1873 and chamberlain since 1878, and was now appointed as court marshal (hoffmarskalk). In 1905 Norway had the personal union with Sweden dissolved, and Haakon VII of Norway was elected as king. Rustad became his first Lord Chamberlain at the request from Prime Minister Christian Michelsen, and served as such until 1925. He was decorated with the Grand Cross of the Royal Norwegian Order of St. Olav.

| Preceded by | Lord Chamberlain of Norway; 1905–1925 | Succeeded by Jacob Roll Knagenhjelm |
