= Carl Rustad =

Norwegian military officer and director

Carl Emil Rustad (10 December 1881 – 1957) was a Norwegian military officer and director.

He was born in Kristiania as a son of Lord Chamberlain Fredrik "Fritz" Frantz Michael Wilhelm Rustad (1852–1930) and Mistress of the Robes Marie Magdalena Schou (1859–1943). He was a maternal grandson of Halvor Schou. In 1909 he married Bergliot Heiberg, a sister of professor Jean Heiberg.

He finished his secondary education in 1899, became an Artillery officer in 1902 and graduated from the Norwegian Military College in 1905. He served at an artillery and dragoon regiment in Lyon for ten months in 1906, then as an aspirant in the General Staff from 1906 to 1917 and military attaché in Stockholm and Petrograd from 1912 to 1917. He was promoted to captain in 1915 and major in 1929. He was decorated with the Order of St. Anna, 3rd Class, as a Knight, First Class of the Order of Vasa and Chevalier of the Legion of Honour.

He was hired in Elektrokemisk in 1917, then in Norsk Sprængstofindustri in 1920. He was then the chief executive officer of Norsk Sprængstofindustri from 1926 to 1946. He was a board member of Norsk Aluminium Company, Oslo Sparebank, Forsikringsselskapet Idun and Storebrand. Eger became a member of the gentlemen's skiing club SK Fram in 1915. He died in 1957.
