= Tollef =

Tollef is a given name. Notable people with the name include:

- Tollef Kilde (1853–1947), Norwegian politician
- Tollef Landsverk (1920–1988), Norwegian judge and civil servant
- Tollef Edward Moen (1870–1950), American politician
- Tollef Tollefsen (1885–1963), Norwegian rower
