= Elise Løvenskiold =

Norwegian court official

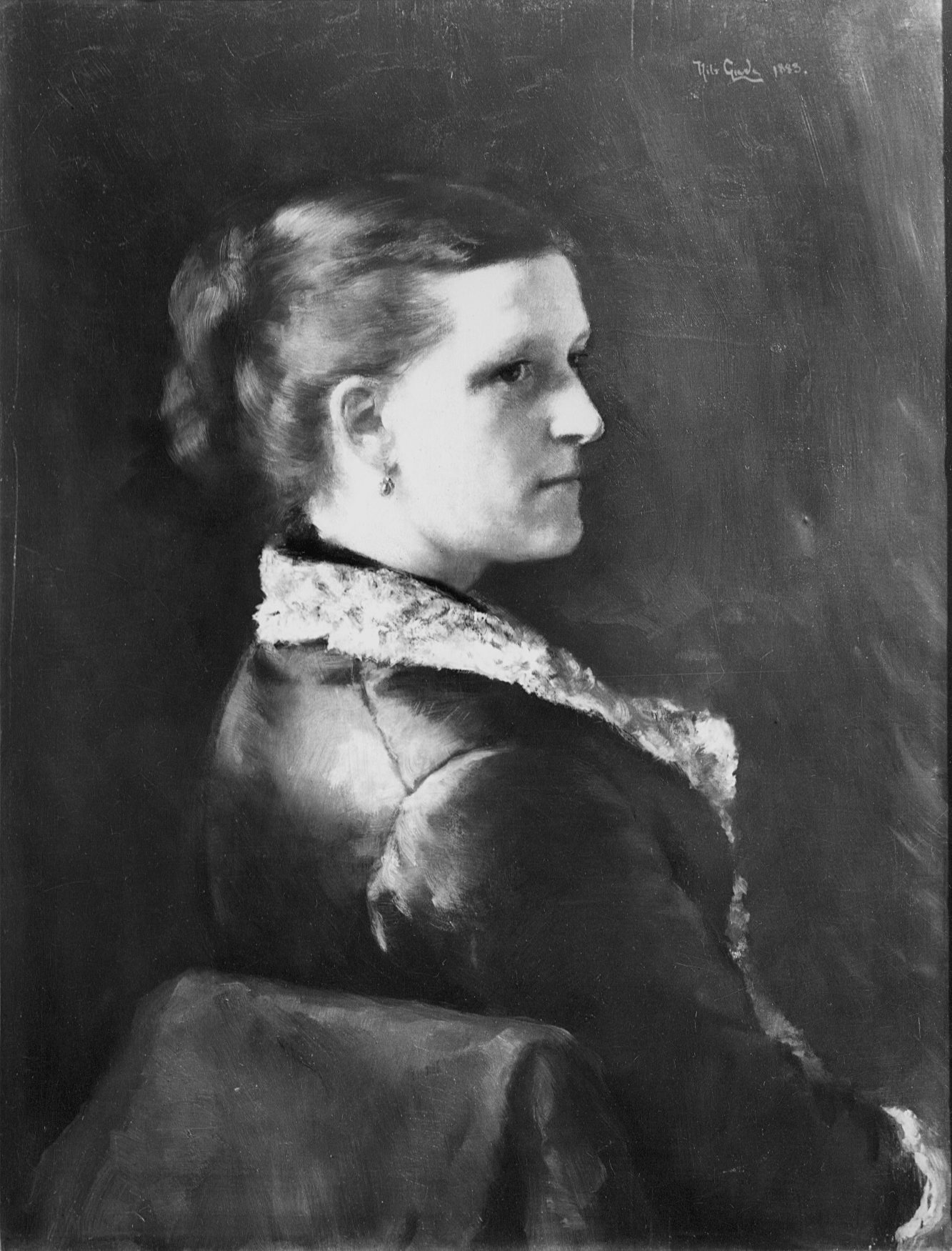
Elise Løvenskiold

Elise Løvenskiold (16 February 1844 – 15 January 1923) was a Norwegian court official. She served as the Chief Court Mistress for Queen Sophia of Norway.

Elise Løvenskiold was the daughter of the Norwegian landowner baron Harald Wedel-Jarlsberg (1811–1897) and Elise Frederikke Butenschøn (1820–1868). She married landowner Carl Otto Løvenskiold in 1865. They were the parents of Harald Løvenskiold (1868–1934). Her spouse served as Norwegian prime minister in Stockholm in 1884.

She was appointed principal lady-in-waiting to Queen Sophie of Norway. The office had traditionally often been appointed to members of the Løvenskiold and Wedel-Jarlsberg families. During the Union of Sweden–Norway, the royal family had a separate Norwegian court who met them at the border and served them during their visits to Norway, after which they escorted them to the Norwegian border, where they were met by their Swedish court again. The Norwegian court was smaller than its Swedish counterpart: in 1890 Elise Løvenskiold had only one lady-in-waiting (maid of honour Helene Wilhelmine Johanne Bull) under her, and in 1903 two (lady-in-waiting Betsy Henriette Emilie Cappelen Rustad and maid-of-honour Helene Wilhelmine Johanne Bull), while her Swedish equivalent Ebba Åkerhielm had three married ladies-in-waiting and three maids-of-honour.

Elise Løvenskiold would have served more than her predecessor, since from 1890 Queen Sophia chose to spend her summers in Norway: between 1892 and 1904 in Skinnarbøl manor outside Kongsvinger.

Court offices
Preceded by Alette Due	Overhoffmesterinne to the Queen of Norway; 1887–1905	Succeeded by Marie Magdalena Rustad
