= Åge Bernhard Grutle =

Norwegian diplomat and royal servant

Åge Bernhard Grutle (born 19 June 1952) is a Norwegian diplomat and royal servant.

He was born in Haugesund, has a master's degree in international affairs, and started his career in the Ministry of Foreign Affairs in 1978. In his early diplomatic career he was stationed at the embassies in South Korea and the Soviet Union. In 1987 he was declared as expelled from the latter country, during a minor diplomatic crisis.

He was a sub-director in the Ministry of Foreign Affairs from 1992 to 1994, secretary for the Standing Committee on Foreign Affairs from 1994 to 1999 as well as leader of the international secretariat, and deputy under-secretary of state in the Ministry of Foreign Affairs from 1999 to 2004. He then became a Norwegian ambassador, first to Japan from 2004 to 2009. In 2005 he led the insight committee on how the Ministry of Foreign Affairs responded to the 2004 Indian Ocean earthquake and tsunami. In 2009 Grutle was appointed as the Lord Chamberlain at the Norwegian Royal Court, but in 2015 he returned to the foreign service as ambassador to Finland.

The Grand Cross of the Order of St Olav was bestowed upon Grutle on 26 August 2015.

Preceded by Rolf Trolle Andersen	Lord Chamberlain of Norway; 2009–2015	Succeeded by Gry Mølleskog
