= Rolf Trolle Andersen =

Norwegian diplomat (born 1945)

Rolf Trolle Andersen (born 14 March 1945) is a Norwegian diplomat.

He was born in Oslo as a son of diplomat Rolf Andersen and maternal grandson of Danish polar explorer Alf Trolle. He is cand.jur. from the University of Oslo and has the CEP from the Institut de Sciences Politiques. He started working for the Norwegian Ministry of Foreign Affairs in 1971.

From 1973 to 1976 Trolle Andersen was posted as Secretary of Embassy in Canada. In 1979 he was named First Secretary of Embassy in Greece. In the 1980s he was Special Advisor for Polar Affairs and travelled to and reached the South Pole in 1985. He served as Norwegian Ambassador to Romania from 1990 to 1994 and then succeeded Terje Rød-Larsen as Special Middle East Coordinator in the Ministry of Foreign Affairs from 1994. In 1997 Trolle Andersen was appointed Norwegian Ambassador to Greece. In 1998, he became Norwegian Ambassador to France after Knut Vollebæk, who had been appointed in 1997, had instead become Minister of Foreign Affairs. Trolle Andersen remained in France until 2003, then was briefly Norwegian Ambassador to Austria in 2004 before serving as Lord Chamberlain at the Norwegian Royal Court from 2004 to 2008. In 2008 he became Ambassador to Switzerland, side-accredited to Liechtenstein and The Holy See. He retired in September 2013 and presently resides in France.

Preceded by Reginald Norby	Norwegian ambassador to France; 1998–2003	Succeeded by Sven-Erik Svedman
Preceded by Lars Petter Forberg	Lord Chamberlain of Norway; 2004–2009	Succeeded by Åge Bernhard Grutle
