= Order of precedence in Norway =

Relative preeminence of officials for ceremonial purposes

The Norwegian order of precedence is the hierarchy of officials in the Government of Norway used to direct seating and ranking on formal occasions, decided by the King, which came into effect from 1 July 1993.

I. The President of the National Assembly, the Prime Minister, the Chief of the Supreme Court, the Vice President of the National Assembly and members of the Cabinet with spouses have, in the Royal Court, rank and seat second to the Royal Family and foreign royal and princely persons. Following these, the Lord Chamberlain, ambassadors of foreign powers, the presidents and vice presidents of the Lagting and Odelsting with spouses.

II. Officials of the Court have rank and file as such:

1. The Mistress of the Robes - with generals
2. Marshal of the Court, Cabinet Secretary - with lieutenant generals
3. Chamberlain, Directors of the Royal Administration, the Royal Household and the King's and the Crown Prince's attendant staff - with major generals.
4. Members of The Civil Staff - with brigadiers.
5. Dames of the Court - with colonels

III. Bearers of The Royal Norwegian Order of St. Olav's Grand Cross with collar have rank and seat directly after the Mistress of the Robes. Bearers of the War Cross (Krigskorset) with sword, the Medal for Outstanding Civic Achievement (Medaljen for Borgerdåd), the Grand Cross of the Royal Norwegian Order of St. Olav and the Royal Order of Merit's Grand Cross have rank and seat before Marshals of the Court and Cabinet Secretaries.

IV. Civil servants in the State's employment have same rank and seat as dignitaries of the court of the same rank, after seniority. Unranked spouses follow the rank of the ranked spouse.

V. Those by court employed who are given an honourable discharge keep their position's title and rank.

1. King Haakon VIII
2. Queen Mette-Marit
3. Crown Princess Ingrid Alexandra
4. Prince Sverre Magnus
5. Princess Märtha Louise
6. Queen Sonja
7. The President of the National Assembly
8. The Prime Minister
9. The Chief of the Supreme Court
10. The Vice President of the National Assembly
11. The Members of the Cabinet:
  1. Minister of Finance
  2. Minister of Agriculture and Food
  3. Minister of Foreign Affairs
  4. Minister of Research and Higher Education
  5. Minister of Local Government and Regional Development
  6. Minister of Defence
  7. Minister of the Environment and International Development
  8. Minister of Trade and Industry
  9. Minister of Labour and Social Inclusion
  10. Minister of Transport and Communications
  11. Minister of Justice and the Police
  12. Minister of Culture and Church Affairs
  13. Minister of Health and Care Services
  14. Minister of Government Administration and Reform
  15. Minister of Petroleum and Energy
  16. Minister for Children and Equality
  17. Minister of Education
  18. Minister of Fisheries and Coastal Affairs
12. The Lord Chamberlain
13. Ambassadors of foreign powers
14. The Mistress of the Robes - with generals
15. Bearers of the Royal Norwegian Order of St. Olav with collar
16. Bearers of the War Cross (Krigskorset) with sword, the Medal for Civil Accomplishments (Borgerdådsmedaljen), the Grand Cross of the Royal Norwegian Order of St. Olav and the Royal Order of Merit's Grand Cross
17. Marshal of the Court, Cabinet Secretary - with lieutenant generals
18. Chamberlain, Directors of the Royal Administration, the Royal Household and the King's and the Crown Prince's attendant staff - with major generals.
19. Members of The Civil Staff - with brigadiers.
20. Dames of the Court - with colonels
