= Medal for Outstanding Civic Service =

Norwegian award

Medaljen for Borgerdåd
- Presented by: Norway
- Status: Currently awarded
- Established: 10 April 1819

Precedence
- Next (higher): War Cross with sword
- Next (lower): Royal Norwegian Order of St. Olav

The Medal for Outstanding Civic Service (Norwegian: Medaljen for Borgerdåd) is the second highest ranked Norwegian medal. In spring 2004 the medal ceased to be awarded. The medal was first established by Royal Resolution April 10, 1819, and later altered by Royal Resolution April 13, 1844. It was awarded by the cabinet meeting presided over by the king after a recommendation by the Norwegian Ministry of Justice.

It is divided into two grades: the first class is in gold and the second class is in silver.

Recipients of the Medal for Outstanding Civic Achievement are ranked 2nd in the Norwegian order of precedence, after recipients of the War Cross with sword and before holders of the Royal Norwegian Order of St. Olav.

== Recipients ==
Gold

- Haakon VII of Norway
- Olav V of Norway
- Hans Riddervold

Silver

- Alfred Eriksen
- Ole Olsen Evenstad (born 1766)
- C. J. Hambro
- Tollef Kilde
- Trygve Lie

== See also ==
- Orders, decorations, and medals of Norway
