= Marie Magdalena Rustad =

Norwegian court official (1859–1943)

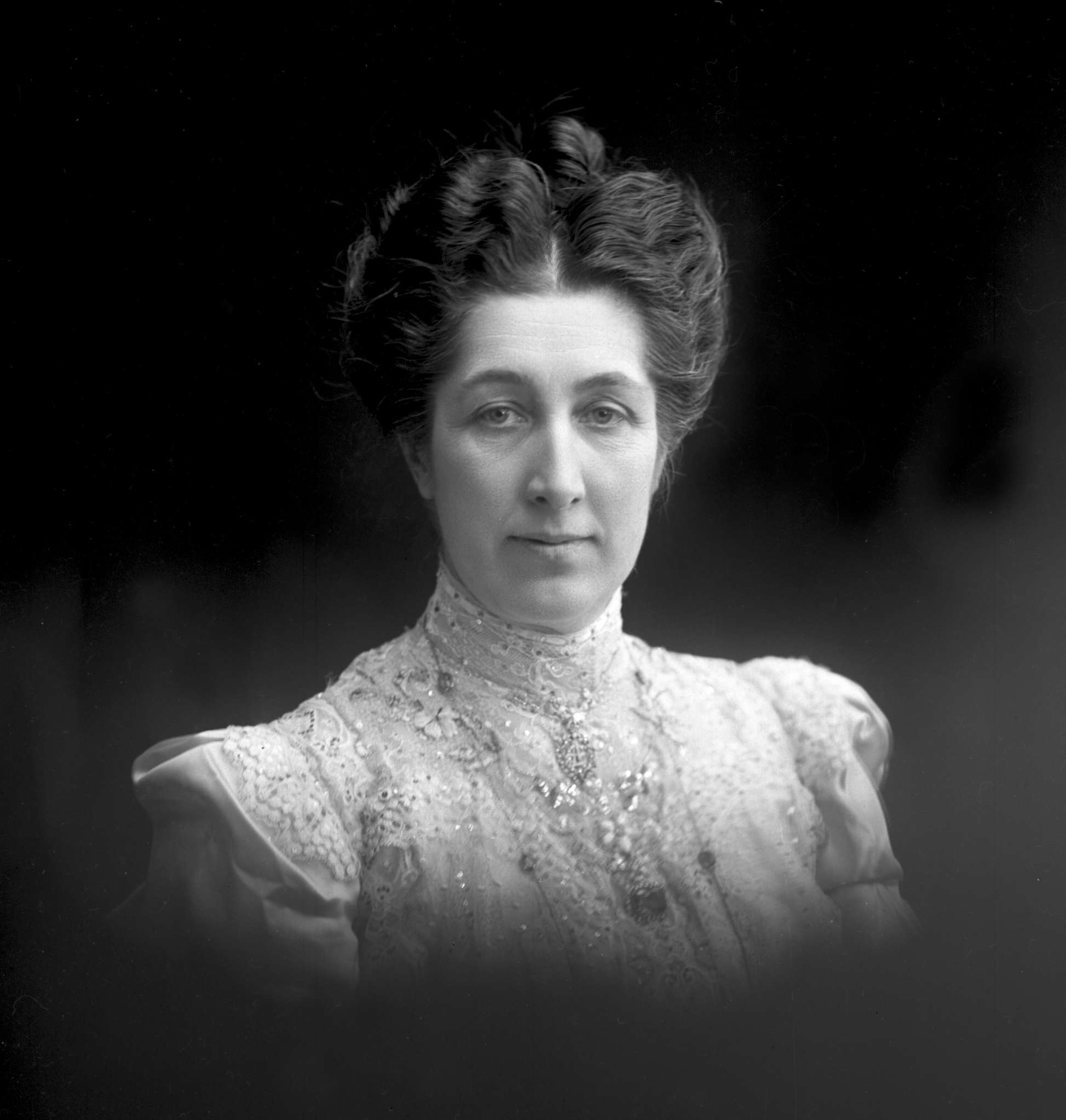
Portrett, Marie Magdalene Rustad - 1908 - Gustav Borgen - Norsk Folkemuseum - NFB.18379

Marie Magdalena "Lillemor" Rustad (21 December 1859 – 22 June 1943), was a Norwegian court official. She served as the Overhoffmesterinne for Queen Maud of Norway.

== Life ==
Marie Magdalena Rustad was the daughter of the industrialist Halvor Schou and Anna Cecilie Crowe and sister of the industrialist Olaf Schou. She married Fritz Rustad in 1880, and became the mother of the military officer and director Carl Rustad. She was an amateur photographer and many of her photographs are preserved.

=== Court career ===
After Norway became an independent Kingdom in 1905, she was appointed Overhoffmesterinne or principal lady-in-waiting to the queen, while her spouse was appointed to the equivalent position to the newly elected king. During the Union of Sweden-Norway the royal family mainly lived in Sweden, and the Norwegian royal court staff only served when the royal family visited Norway. Her predecessor Elise Løvenskiold had served queen Sophie of Norway and Sweden when the queen visited Norway. There were thus tradition to build upon, however the duties of the new court staff were to be more extensive and the court became a permanent institution. The court was however to be small: in 1914, she had only two hoffdame or ladies-in-waiting (maids-of-honours Marie Fougner and Fredrikke Dorothea Hagerup) under her.

Both she and her spouse participated in the coronation in Trondheim on 22 June 1906, where she and the three ladies-in-waiting Mimi (Emilie) Krag, Alexandra Huitfeldt and Marie Fougner followed after admiral Sparre, general Ole Hansen and the king and queen, and she and her spouse personally escorted the queen to the altar when she was crowned by the bishop Wexelsen.

Queen Maud did not care for representational duties. However, such duties were numerous because she was the only female member of the new royal family. Furthermore, the queen made frequent visits to her native Britain, which prevented her from fulfilling representational duties in Norway. Consequently, she was given much support by Rustad. The office of the principal lady-in-waiting in Norway came to be that of a deputy hostess to the queen. Rustad participated in many representational events, such as during the visit of Theodore Roosevelt to Oslo in 1910.

Marie Magdalena Rustad and her spouse both retired in 1925.

Court offices
Preceded by Elise Løvenskiold	Overhoffmesterinne to the Queen of Norway; 1906–1925	Succeeded by Emma Stang
