= Tollef Kilde =

Norwegian politician

Tollef Hansen Kilde (17 July 1853 – 2 January 1947) was a Norwegian forest owner, business founder and politician.

He was born in Åmot Municipality as a son of forest owner Hans Tollefsen Kilde (1822–1882) and Oline Grini (1827–1871). He attended Sagatun Folk High School, the Norwegian College of Agriculture and the Forestry Academy in Tharandt. In 1878 he took over the family farm, Kilde. It fell out of use in 1927 because of economic problems, but was inherited by his son in 1938. He was married twice; first from 1880 to Pauline Iversdatter Arnestad (1858–1917), but the marriage was dissolved; then from November 1903 to Hanna Fredrikke Hansdatter Arnestad (1877–1955).

Kilde was an active politician. Locally he was a member of Åmot municipal council from 1881 to 1925, serving as mayor from 1890 to 1893 and 1905 to 1910. For the Liberal Party, he was a deputy representative to the Parliament of Norway during the term 1891–1894. In the 1909 election he was fielded as the Liberal candidate in the single-member constituency Søndre Østerdalen, but ended a distant fourth behind the Labour Democrat, Liberal Left and Conservative candidates. He later joined the Liberal Left Party, and in the 1921 election he was a minor ballot candidate for the Norwegian Agrarian Association, which had now entered politics (from 1922 as the Agrarian Party). Kilde had chaired Hedemark Agrarian Association, and served as deputy chairman of the Norwegian Agrarian Association, already from 1905 to 1907. He was a central board member from 1904 to 1908 and 1913 to 1934.

Kilde's main endeavor was to develop Østerdalen in general, and Rena in particular. He was a financial, political and administrative contributor to the foundations of Osfallet Power Plant, Rena Kartonfabrik and Rena Træsliperi to continue local hydroelectricity and refinery of the region's rich forest resources; two bridges over the local rivers Glomma and Rena (1890); and the inclusion of a Rena Station in the Norwegian railway network. He also contributed to the foundation of the school in Rena, which is now a campus of Hedmark University College, the fire insurance company Aamot Brandkasse and the local co-op.

A failed endeavor, however, was the construction of a channel in Glomma, all the way from Nedre Glomma to Storsjøen. Østerdalen would be "the furute Canada", wrote Kilde, if the plan were to come to reality. A separate Trysil Line on the railway network was never materialized either.

Kilde was decorated as a Knight, First Class of the Order of St. Olav in 1897, received the Medal for Outstanding Civic Service in silver in 1933 and the Norwegian Agrarian Association honorary medal. The main street in Rena is named after him, and a bauta has also been erected in the town.
