= Order of St. Olav =

Norwegian chivalric order

Royal Norwegian Order of Saint Olav; Den Kongelige Norske Sankt Olavs Orden
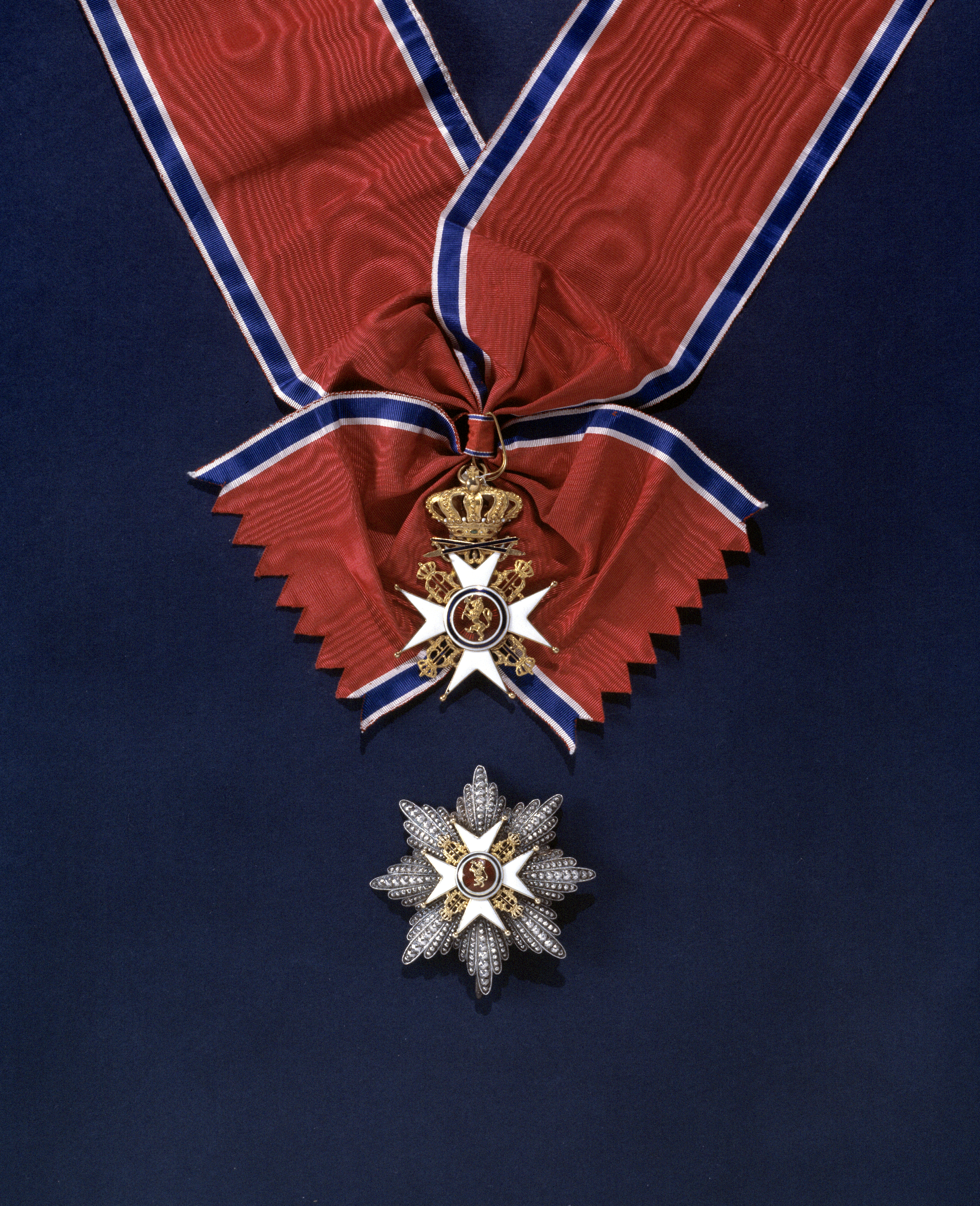
- Grand Cross set of the Order (1st type)

Awarded by King of Norway
- Type: Chivalric order with five degrees
- Established: 21 August 1847; 179 years ago
- Motto: RET OG SANDHED (Justice and Truth)
- Criteria: Remarkable accomplishments on behalf of the country and humanity
- Status: Currently constituted
- Grand Master: King Haakon VIII
- Grades: Grand Cross with Collar; Grand Cross; Commander with Star; Commander; Knight 1st Class; Knight

Precedence
- Next (higher): Medal for Outstanding Civic Service
- Next (lower): Royal Norwegian Order of Merit
- Riband of the Order of St. Olav

The Royal Norwegian Order of Saint Olav (Norwegian: Den Kongelige Norske Sankt Olavs Orden; or Sanct Olafs Orden, the old Norwegian name) is a Norwegian order of chivalry instituted by King Oscar I on 21 August 1847. It is named after King Olav II, known to posterity as St. Olav.

Just before the union with Sweden was dissolved in 1905, the Order of the Norwegian Lion was instituted in 1904 by King Oscar II, but no appointments were awarded by his successor, King Haakon VII. The Order of St. Olav thus became the kingdom's only order of chivalry for the next 80 years. The Grand Master of the order is the reigning monarch of Norway. It is used to reward individuals for remarkable accomplishments on behalf of the country and humanity. Since 1985, appointments to the order have only been conferred upon Norwegian citizens, though foreign heads of state and royalty may be appointed as a matter of courtesy.

== Grades and classes ==
The reigning monarch of Norway is the order's Grand Master. The order consists of three grades, of which two are divided into two classes, and may be awarded for either civilian or military contributions, in descending order of distinction. The collar is awarded as a separate distinction of the Grand Cross to those recipients deemed exceptionally worthy.

- Grand Cross (Storkors) – awarded to heads of state as a courtesy and in rare cases to individuals for merit; wears the badge on a collar (chain), plus the star on the left chest. If the collar is not worn the badge may be worn on a sash on the right shoulder;
- Commander, which is divided into two classes:
  - Commander with Star (Kommandør med stjerne) – wears the badge on a necklet, plus the star on the left chest;
  - Commander (Kommandør) – wears the badge on a necklet;
- Knight, which is divided into two classes:
  - Knight 1st Class (Ridder av 1. klasse) – wears the badge on a ribbon on the left chest;
  - Knight (Ridder) – wears the badge on a ribbon on the left chest.

Ribbon bars
| Grand Cross with Collar | Grand Cross | Commander with Star | Commander | Knight 1st Class | Knight |

== Insignia ==
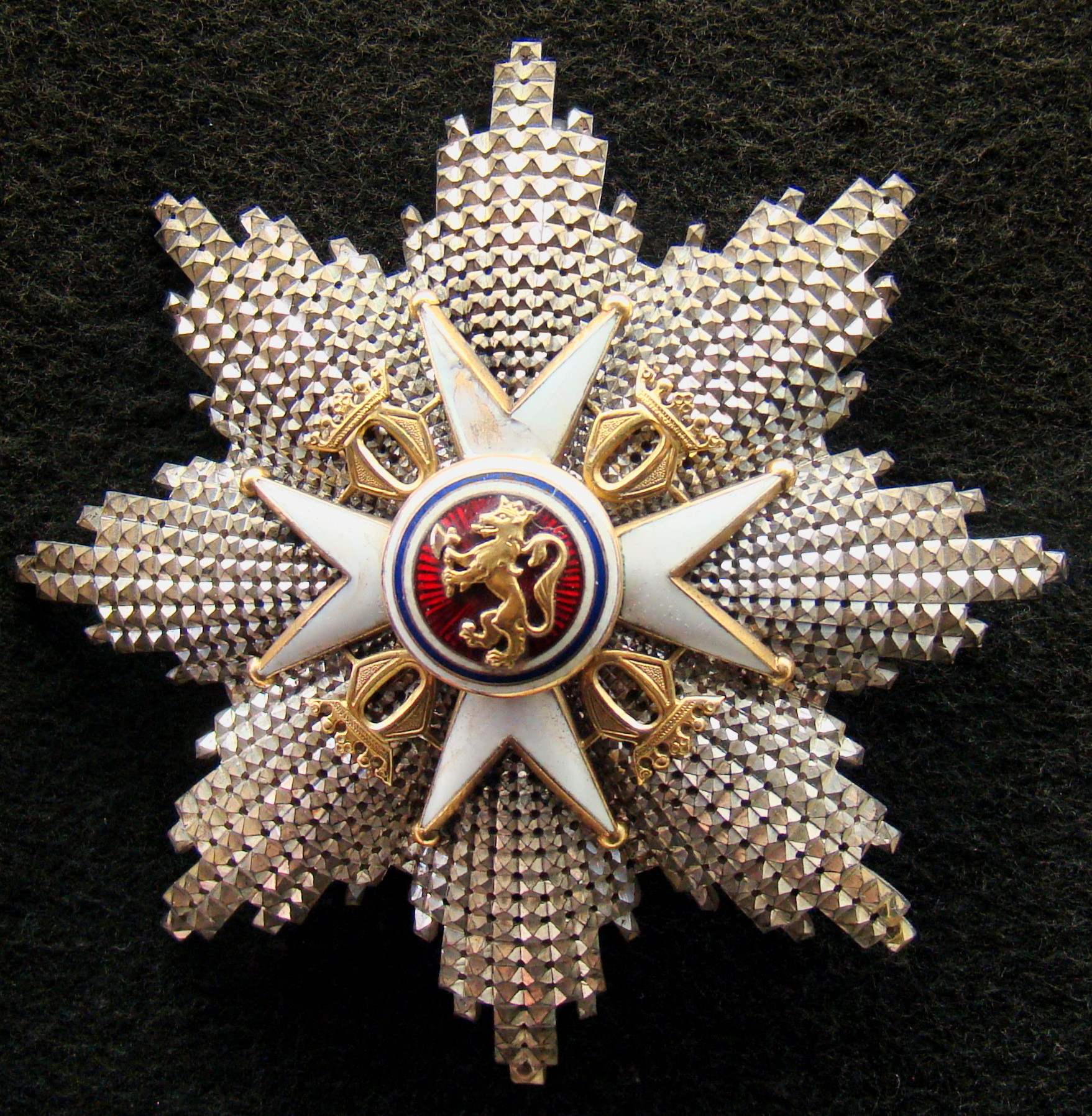
The Star of The Order of Saint Olav

Design of the collar of the Order of St. Olav since 1906.

The collar of the Order is in gold, with five enamelled and crowned monograms "O", five enamelled and crowned coat-of-arms of Norway, and 10 gold crosses bottony each flanked by two battle axes with silver blades and golden shafts (The latter element is also featured in the coat of arms of the Church of Norway).

The badge of the Order is a white enamelled Maltese Cross, in silver for the knight class and in gilt of the higher classes; crowned monograms "O" appear between the arms of the cross. The obverse central disc is red with the golden Norwegian lion rampart bearing a battle-axe; the reverse disc bears King Oscar I's motto «Ret og Sandhed» – "Justice and Truth" in Norwegian; both discs are surrounded by a white-blue-white ring. The cross is topped by a crown; military awards have crossed swords between the crown and the cross.

The star of the Order for the Grand Cross is an eight-pointed silver star with faceted rays, bearing the obverse of the badge of the Order (minus the crown on the top).

The star for Commander with Star is a silver faceted Maltese Cross, with gilt crowned monograms "O" between the arms of the cross. The central disc is red with the golden Norwegian lion rampart bearing a battle axe, surrounded by a white-blue-white ring.

The ribbon of the Order is red with white-blue-white edge stripes.

In very exceptional circumstances the Order may be awarded "with diamonds", in which case a ring of diamonds replaces the white-blue-white enamel ring surrounding the central disc on the front of the badge as well as in the crown.

The insignia are expected to be returned either upon the receiver's advancement to a higher level of the order or upon his or her death. The insignia are produced in Norway by craftsmen.

== Eligibility and appointment ==
The King makes appointments upon the recommendation of a six-member commission, none of whom may be a member of the government, consisting of a chancellor, vice chancellor, the Lord Chamberlain (acting as treasurer), and three other representatives. The Lord Chamberlain nominates the members of the commission, and the monarch approves them. Nominations to the order are directed at the commission through the county governor.

Princes and princesses with succession rights to the throne are appointed to the highest degree upon reaching their age of majority.

== Ranking ==
The Order of St. Olav is the highest civilian honour currently conferred by Norway and only ranks after the military War Cross among all Norwegian decorations still awarded in the general ranking.

In the order of precedence used at the royal court of Norway, bearers of the Royal Norwegian Order of St. Olav with collar are ranked 15th in the order of precedence, directly after the Mistress of the Robes and generals and directly before recipients of the War Cross with Sword. Bearers of the Grand Cross of the Royal Norwegian Order of St. Olav are ranked 16th.

== Current holders of the Grand Cross ==
This list contains holders of the Grand Cross, some of whom have also been awarded the Collar and gives the year of their appointment. The list is collated alphabetically by the last name; those recipients not possessing the last name, such as royalty and most Icelanders are collated by the first name. Six of the listed are not heads of states or royals; these are marked by names in bold. Before the Royal Norwegian Order of Merit was created in 1985, appointments to the Order of St Olav was awarded to members of a foreign delegation during state visits. Many holders of the Grand Cross who are not heads of state are not listed here.

| Country | Name | Charge | Grand Cross with Collar | Grand Cross | Year |
|---|---|---|---|---|---|
| Argentina | Mauricio Macri | Former President | | Yes | 2018 |
| Austria | Heinz Fischer | Former President | | Yes | 2007 |
| Belgium | Albert II | Former King (when Prince) | Yes | | 1964 |
| Belgium | Mathilde | Queen | | Yes | 2003 |
| Belgium | Paola | Former Queen | | Yes | 1997 |
| Belgium | Philippe | King | | Yes | 2003 |
| Brazil | Luiz Inácio Lula da Silva | President | | Yes | 2003 |
| Bulgaria | Georgi Parvanov | Former President | | Yes | 2006 |
| Croatia | Ivo Josipović | Former President | | Yes | 2011 |
| Denmark | Benedikte | Princess | | Yes | 1974 |
| Denmark | Frederik X | King (when Crown Prince) | Yes | Yes | 2024, 1990 |
| Denmark | Joachim | Prince | | Yes | 1991 |
| Denmark | Margrethe II | Queen (when Princess) | Yes | Yes | 1958 |
| Denmark | Marie | Princess | | Yes | 2014 |
| Denmark | Mary | Queen (when Crown Princess) | | Yes | 2005 |
| Denmark | Christian | Crown Prince (when Prince) | | Yes | 2023 |
| Estonia | Toomas Hendrik Ilves | Former President | | Yes | 2014 |
| Finland | Alexander Stubb | President | | Yes | 2024 |
| Finland | Sauli Niinistö | Former President | | Yes | 2012 |
| Finland | Tarja Halonen | Former President | | Yes | 2000 |
| Finland | Tellervo Koivisto | Former President's wife | | Yes | 1983 |
| France | Emmanuel Macron | President | | Yes | 2025 |
| Germany | Joachim Gauck | Former President | | Yes | 2014 |
| Germany | Marianne von Weizsäcker | Former first lady | | Yes | 1986 |
| Iran | Farah Pahlavi | Former Empress | | Yes | 1965 |
| Iceland | Halla Tómasdóttir | President | | Yes | 2025 |
| Iceland | Guðni Th. Jóhannesson | Former President | | Yes | 2017 |
| Iceland | Ólafur Ragnar Grímsson | Former President | | Yes | 1982 |
| Iceland | Vigdís Finnbogadóttir | Former President | Yes | | ? |
| Italy | Sergio Mattarella | President | | Yes | 2016 |
| Japan | Akihito | Emperor Emeritus | Yes | Yes | 2001, 1953 |
| Japan | Masako | Empress (when Crown Princess) | | Yes | 2001 |
| Japan | Michiko | Empress Emerita | | Yes | 2001 |
| Japan | Naruhito | Emperor (when Crown Prince) | | Yes | 2001 |
| Japan | Nobuko | Princess | | Yes | 2001 |
| Jordan | Abdullah II | King | | Yes | 2000 |
| Jordan | Hussein | Crown Prince | | Yes | 2020 |
| Jordan | Hassan | Prince (when Crown Prince) | | Yes | 1980 |
| Jordan | Rania | Queen | | Yes | 2000 |
| Latvia | Guntis Ulmanis | Former President | | Yes | 1998 |
| Latvia | Vaira Vīķe-Freiberga | Former President | | Yes | 2000 |
| Latvia | Andris Bērziņš | Former President | | Yes | 2015 |
| Lithuania | Valdas Adamkus | Former President | | Yes | 1998 |
| Lithuania | Dalia Grybauskaitė | Former President | | Yes | 2011 |
| Luxembourg | Henri | Former Grand Duke | Yes | | 2011 |
| Luxembourg | Maria Teresa | Former Grand Duchess | | Yes | 1996 |
| Netherlands | Beatrix | Former Queen (when Princess) | Yes | | 1964 |
| Netherlands | Margriet | Princess | | Yes | 1964 |
| Netherlands | Willem-Alexander | King | Yes | Yes | 2021, 1996 |
| Netherlands | Máxima | Queen | | Yes | 2013 |
| Norway | Kjell Magne Bondevik | Former Prime Minister | | Yes | 2004 |
| Norway | Lars Petter Forberg | Former Lord Chamberlain of the Royal Household | | Yes | 2004 |
| Norway | Åge Bernhard Grutle | Former Lord Chamberlain of the Royal Household | | Yes | 2015 |
| Norway | Haakon VIII | King | Yes; Grand Master | | 1991 |
| Norway | Magne Hagen | Former Cabinet Secretary to the King | | Yes | 2000 |
| Norway | Ingrid Alexandra | Crown Princess | | Yes | 2022 |
| Norway | Märtha Louise | Princess | Yes | | 1989 |
| Norway | Mette-Marit | Queen | Yes | | 2016, 2001 |
| Norway | Edvard Moser | Professor, psychologist and neuroscientist, Nobel laureate | Yes | | 2018 |
| Norway | May-Britt Moser | Professor, psychologist and neuroscientist, Nobel laureate | Yes | | 2018 |
| Norway | Gry Mølleskog | Former Lord Chamberlain of the Royal Household | Yes | | 2022 |
| Norway | Arne Omholt | Former Marshal of the Court | Yes | | 2016 |
| Norway | Carsten Smith | Former Chief Justice of the Supreme Court of Norway | Yes | | 2003 |
| Norway | Sonja | Former Queen | Yes | | 1972 |
| Norway | Sverre Magnus | Prince | | Yes | 2023 |
| Norway | Berit Tversland | Former Cabinet Secretary to the King | | Yes | 2012 |
| Poland | Andrzej Duda | Former President | | Yes | 2016 |
| Poland | Bronislaw Komorowski | Former President | | Yes | 2012 |
| Poland | Aleksander Kwaśniewski | Former President | | Yes | 1996 |
| Poland | Lech Wałęsa | Former President | | Yes | 1995 |
| Portugal | António Ramalho Eanes | Former President | Yes | | 1978 |
| Portugal | Aníbal Cavaco Silva | Former President | | Yes | 2008 |
| Romania | Emil Constantinescu | Former President | | Yes | 1999 |
| South Korea | Moon Jae-in | Former President | | Yes | 2019 |
| Slovakia | Andrej Kiska | Former President | | Yes | 2018 |
| Slovakia | Ivan Gašparovič | Former President | | Yes | 2010 |
| Slovenia | Borut Pahor | Former President | | Yes | 2019 |
| Slovenia | Danilo Türk | Former President | | Yes | 2011 |
| Spain | Cristina | Infantas | | Yes | 1995 |
| Spain | Elena | Infantas | | Yes | 1995 |
| Spain | Felipe | King | | Yes | 1995 |
| Spain | Juan Carlos I | Former King | Yes | | 1982 |
| Spain | Sofía | Former Queen | | Yes | 1982 |
| Sweden | Carl XVI Gustaf | King | Yes | | 1974 |
| Sweden | Carl Philip | Prince | | Yes | 2005 |
| Sweden | Christina | Princess | | Yes | 1992 |
| Sweden | Daniel | Prince | | Yes | 2022 |
| Sweden | Désirée | Princess | | Yes | 1992 |
| Sweden | Madeleine | Princess | | Yes | 2005 |
| Sweden | Silvia | Queen | | Yes | 1982 |
| Sweden | Victoria | Crown Princess | | Yes | 1995 |
| Turkey | Abdullah Gül | Former President | | Yes | 2013 |
| United Kingdom | Charles III | King (when Prince) | Yes | | 1978 |
| United Kingdom | Edward | Prince and Duke of Kent | | Yes | 1988 |
| United Kingdom | Richard | Prince and Duke of Gloucester | | Yes | 1973 |

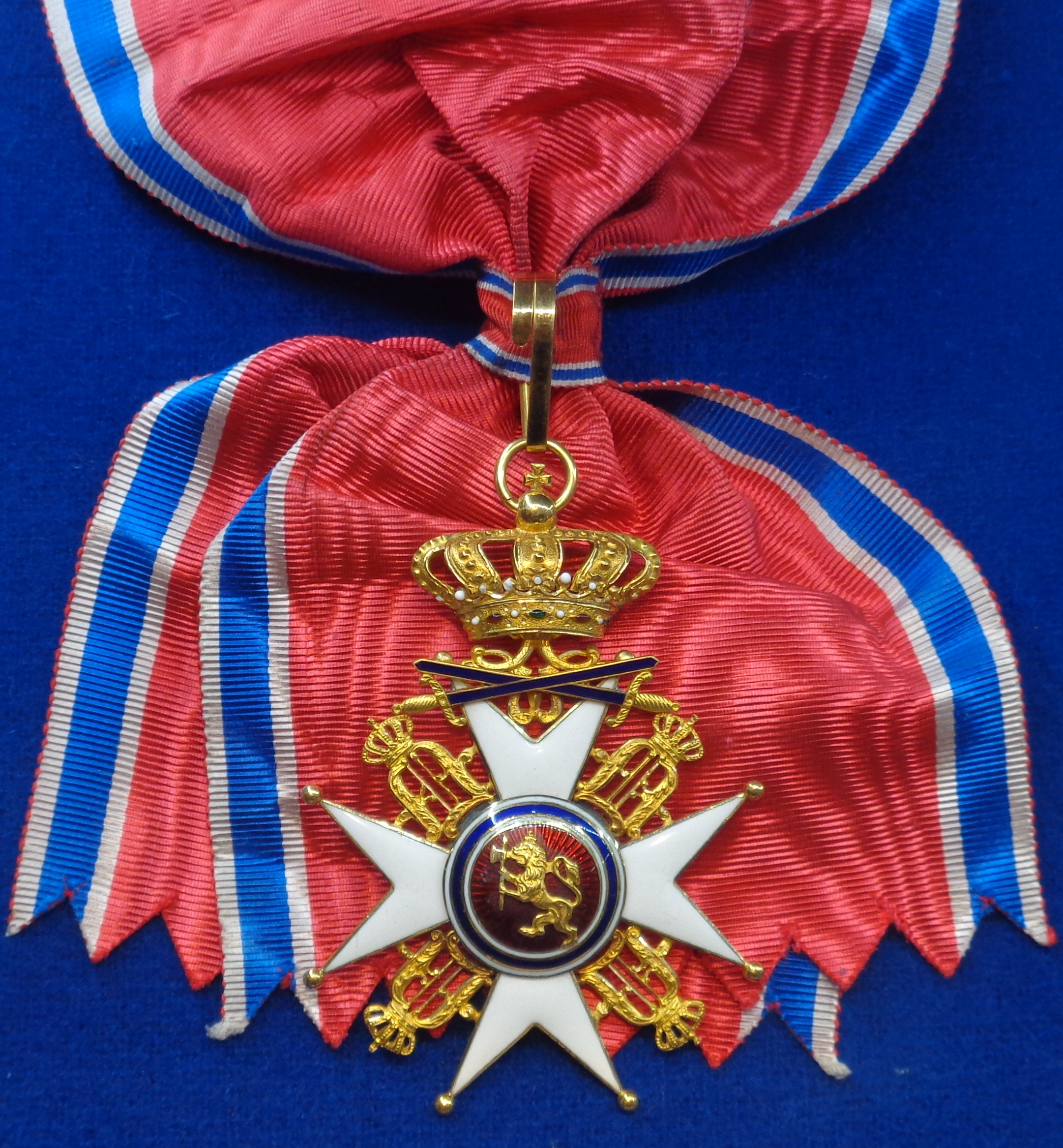
Order of Saint Olav Grand Cross with swords badge 1st Type

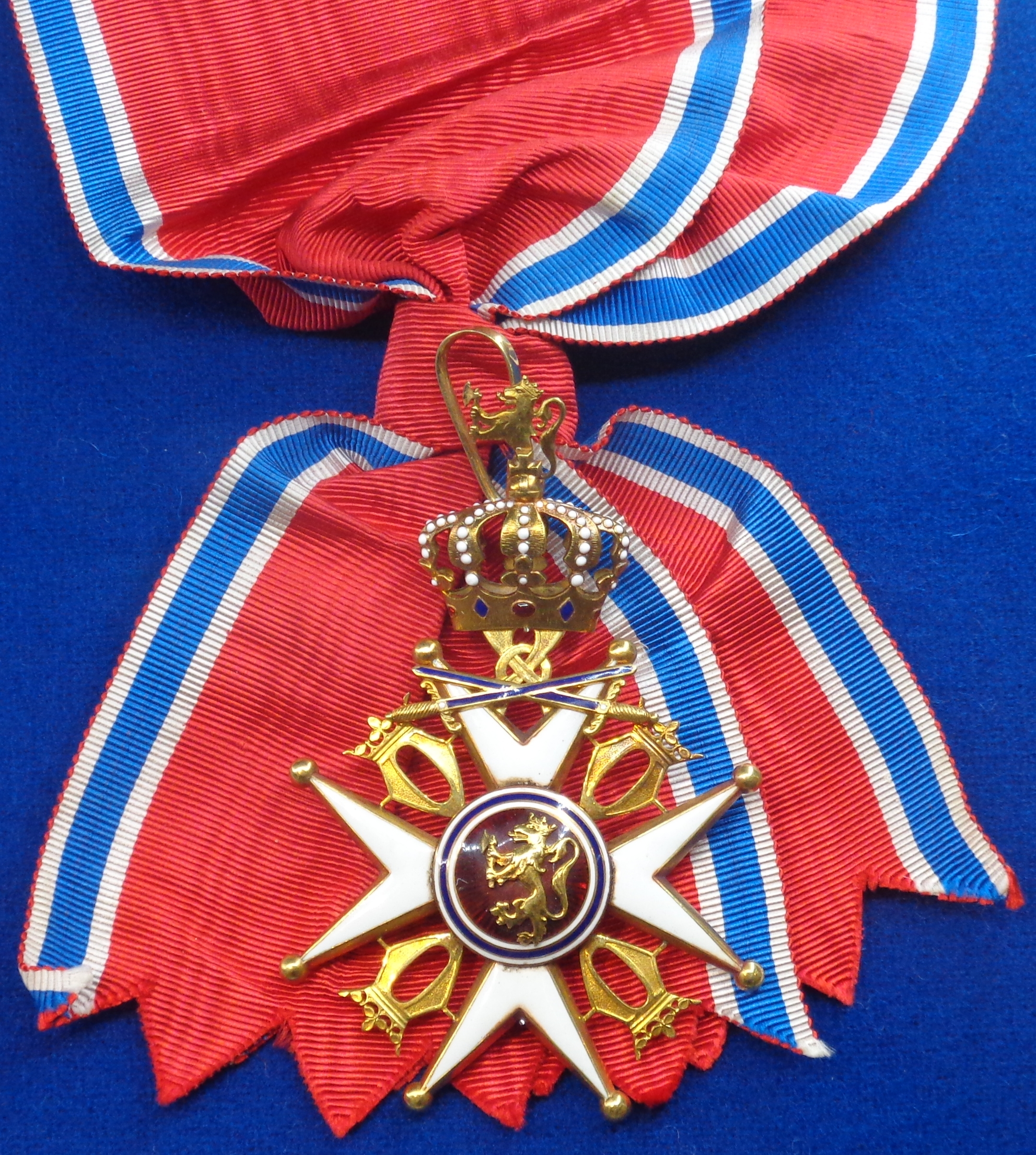
Order of Saint Olav Grand Cross with swords badge 2nd Type

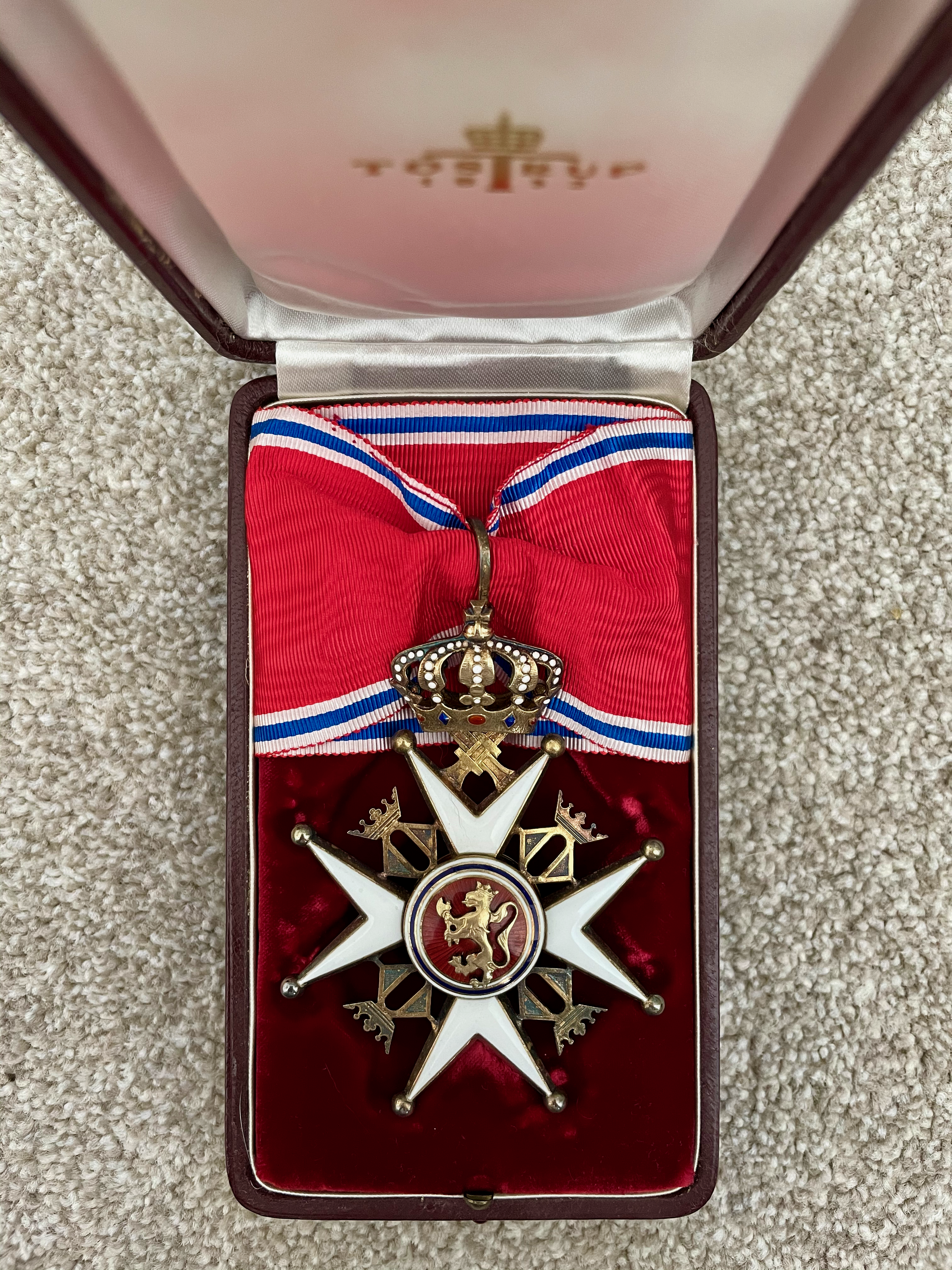
Order of St Olav - Commander

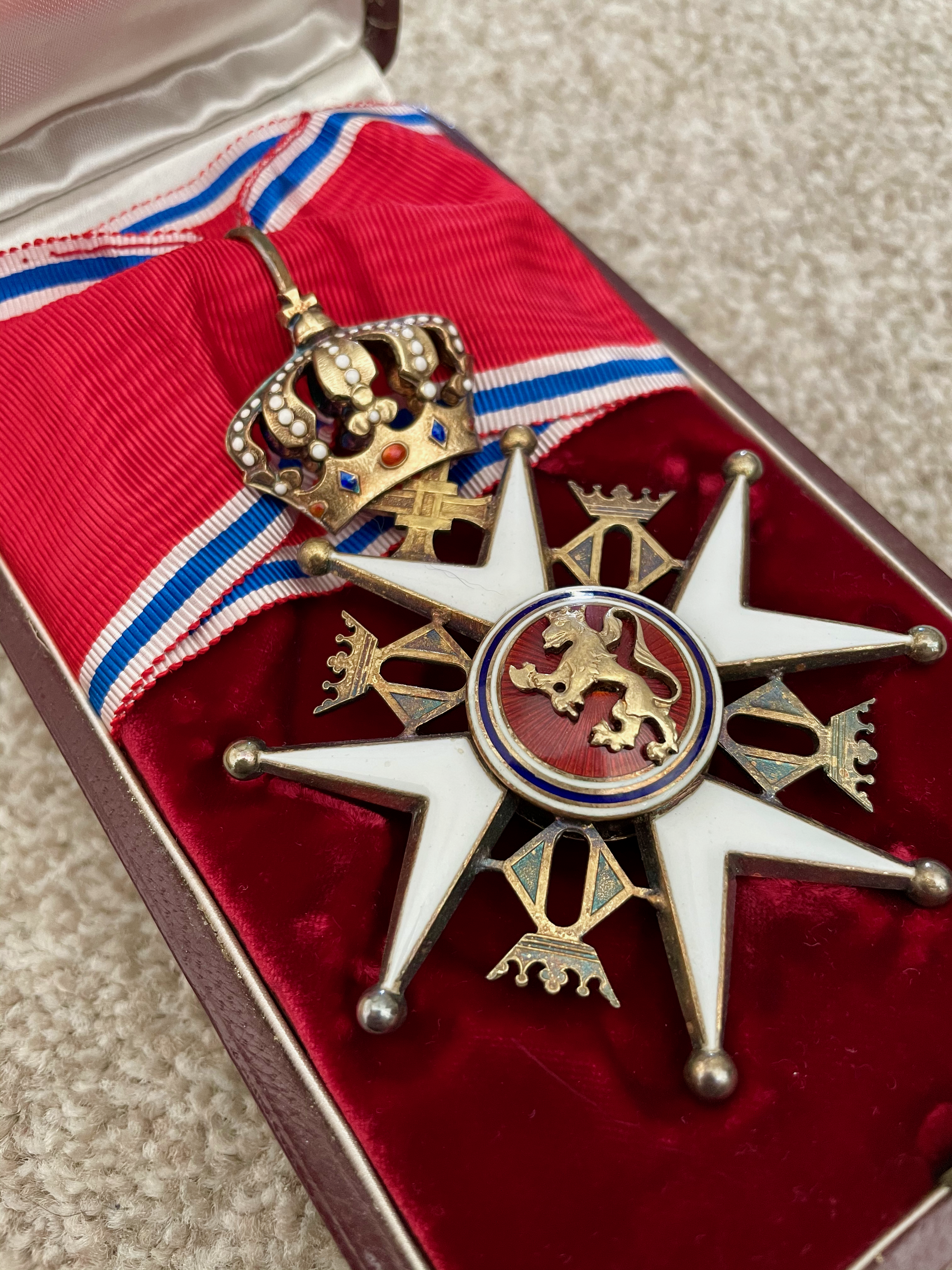
Order of St Olav - Commander

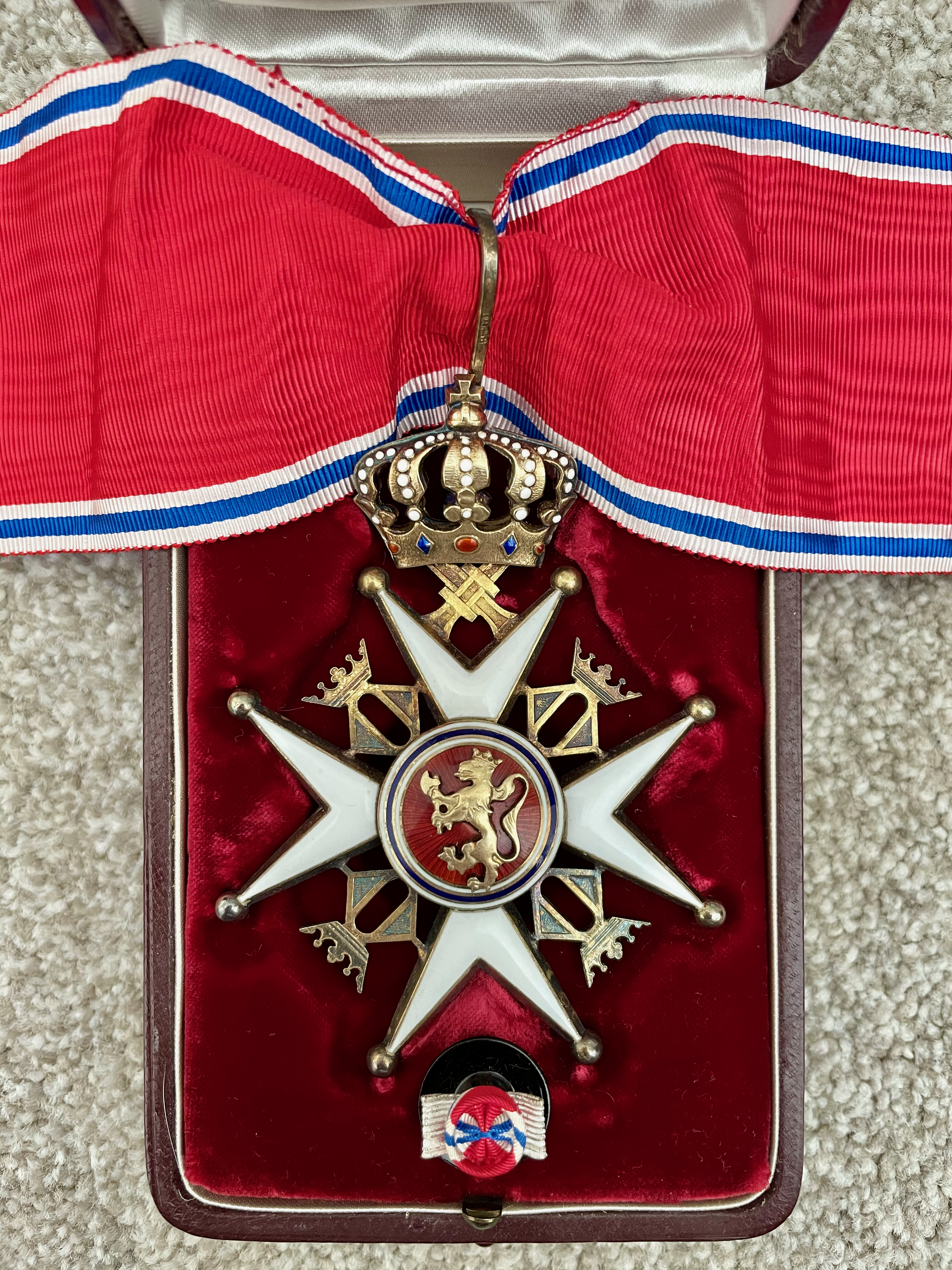
Order of St Olav - Commander

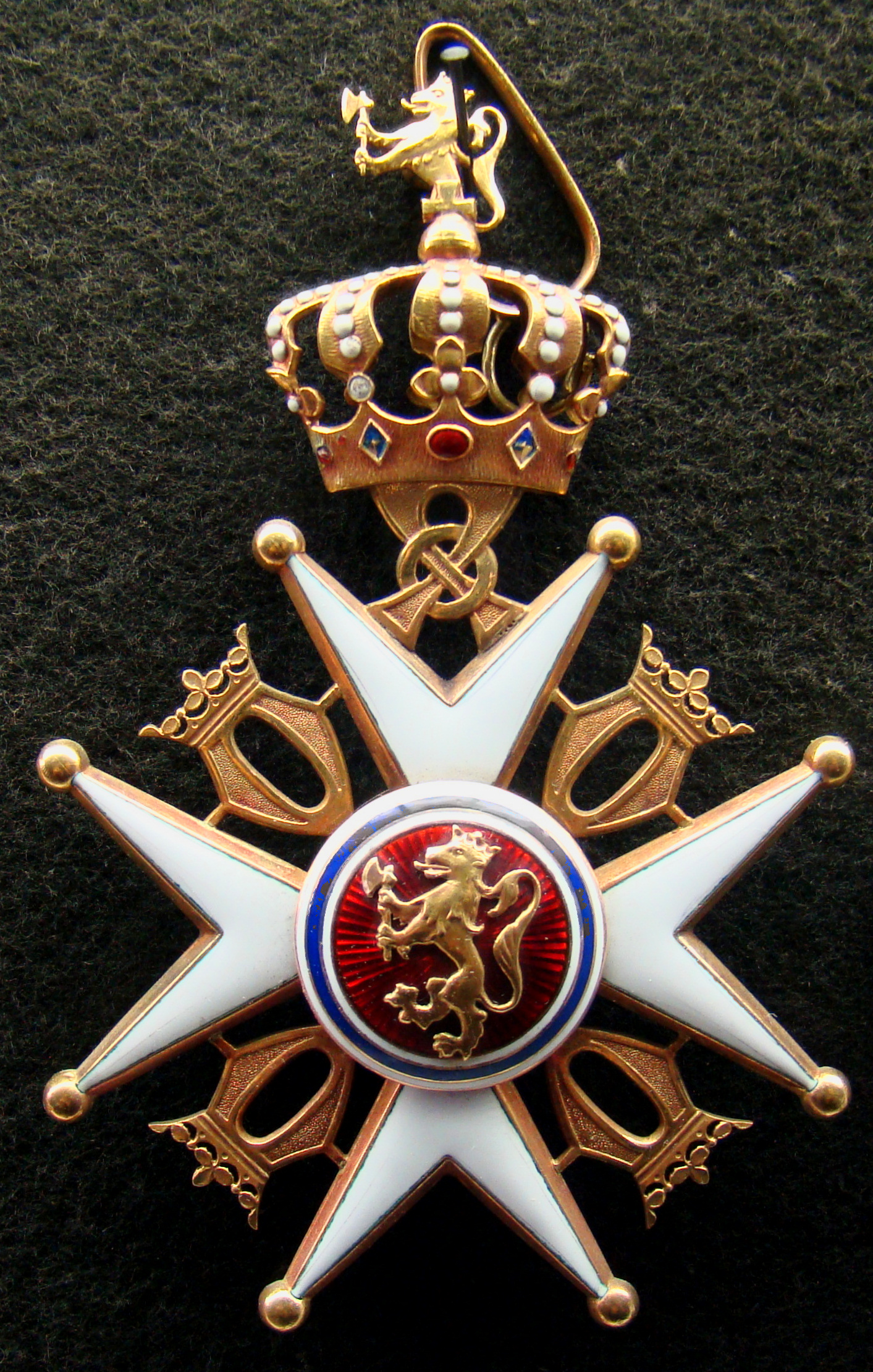
Order of St. Olav Grand Cross badge

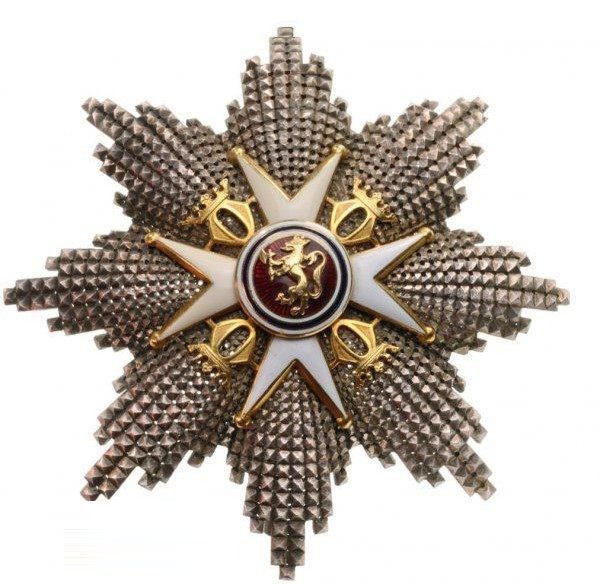
Order of St. Olav Grand Cross Star

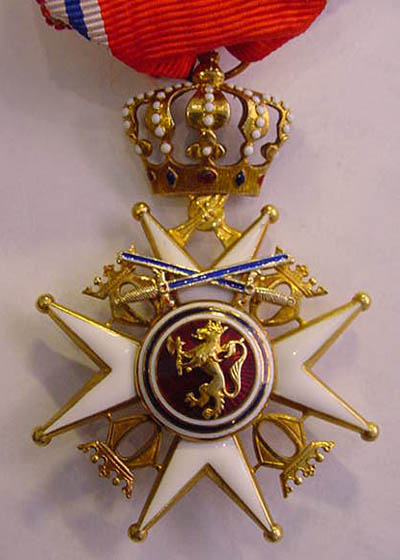
Order of St. Olav Knights Class

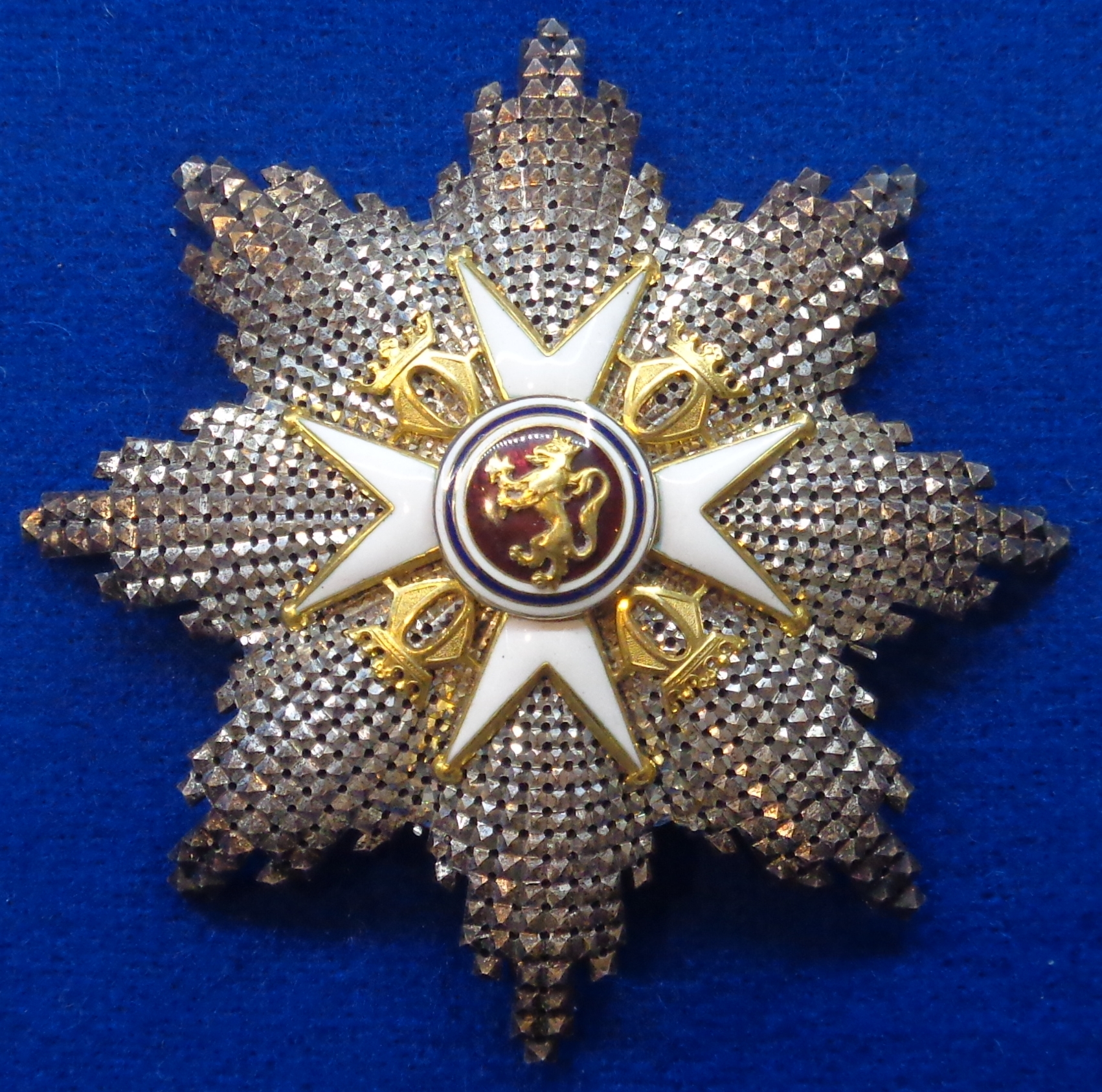
Order of St. Olav Grand Cross Star - 2nd Type

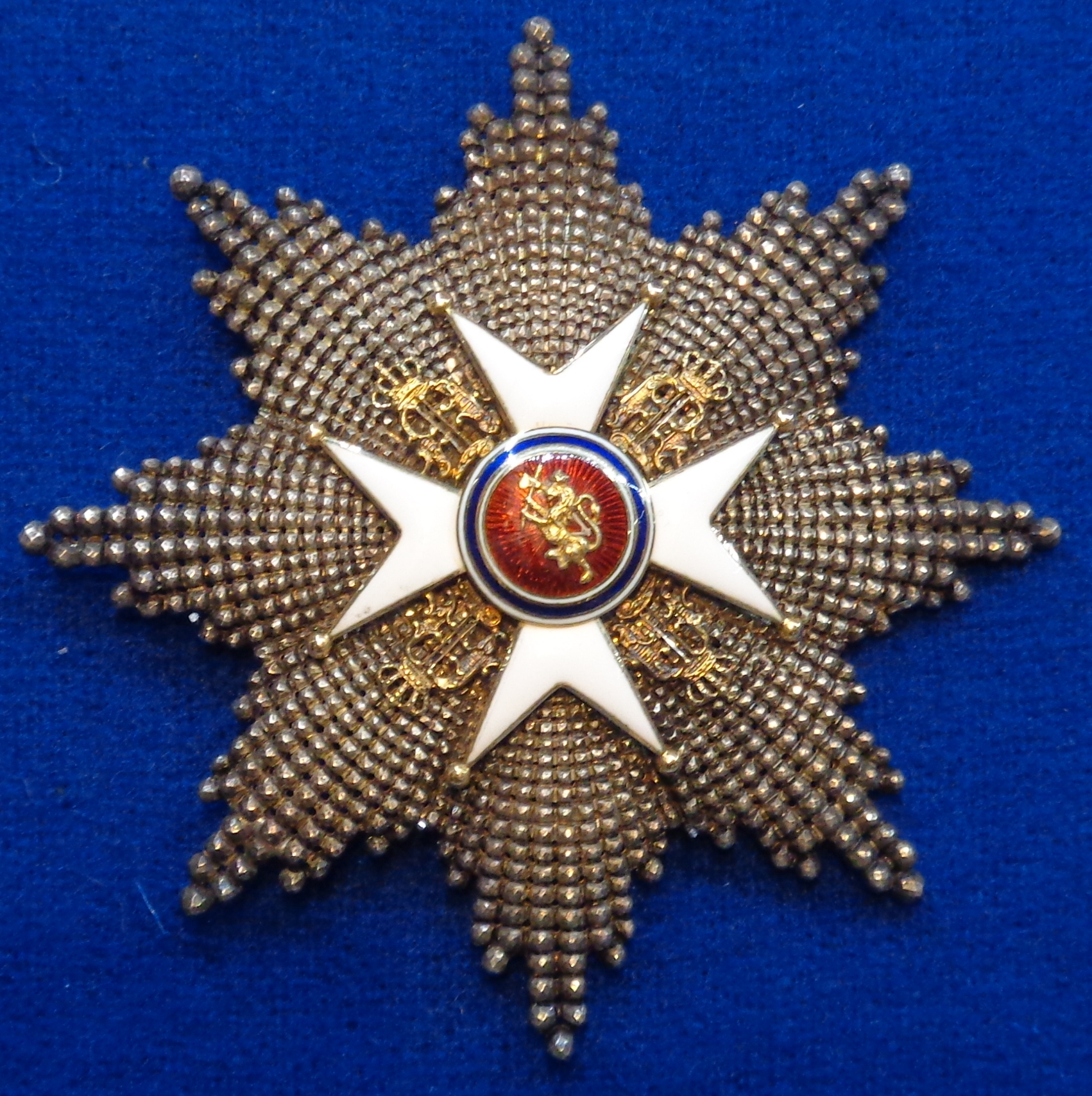
Order of St. Olav Grand Cross Star - 1st Type

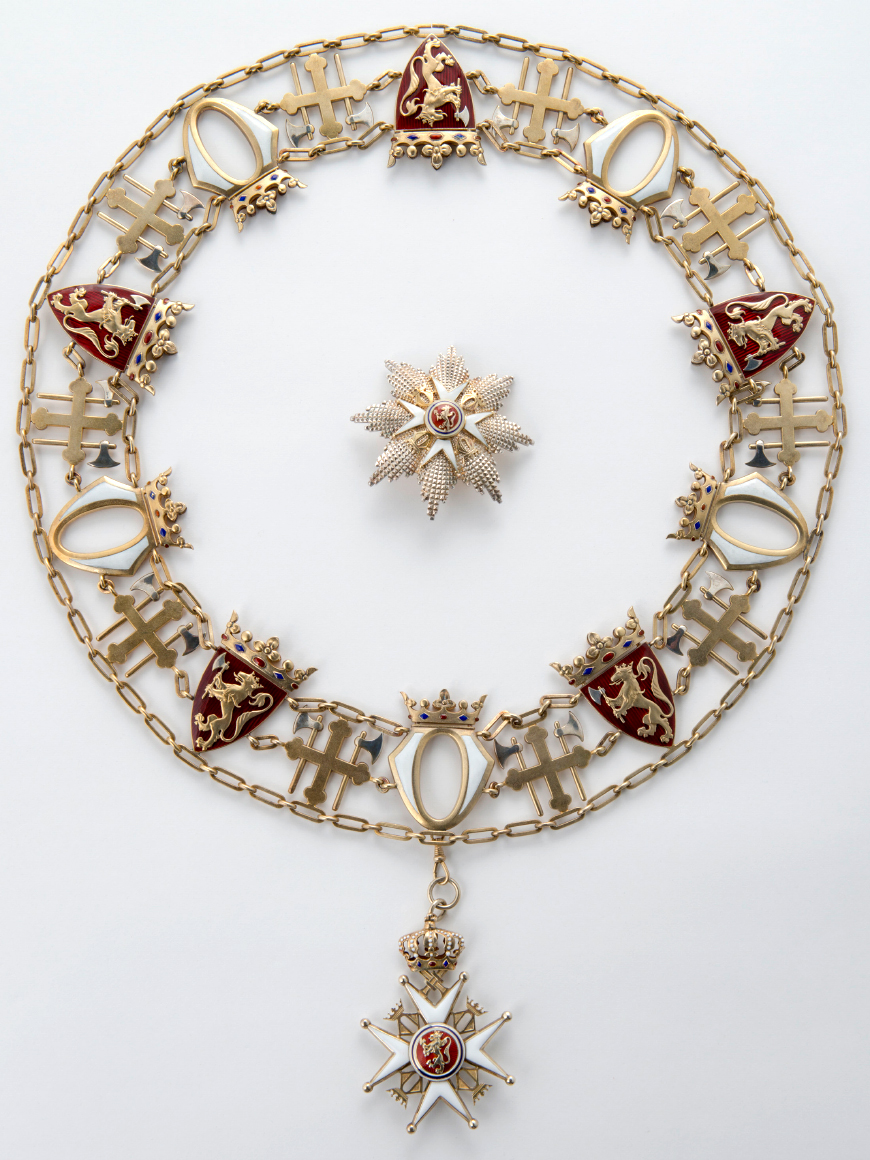
Order of St. Olav Collar and Star

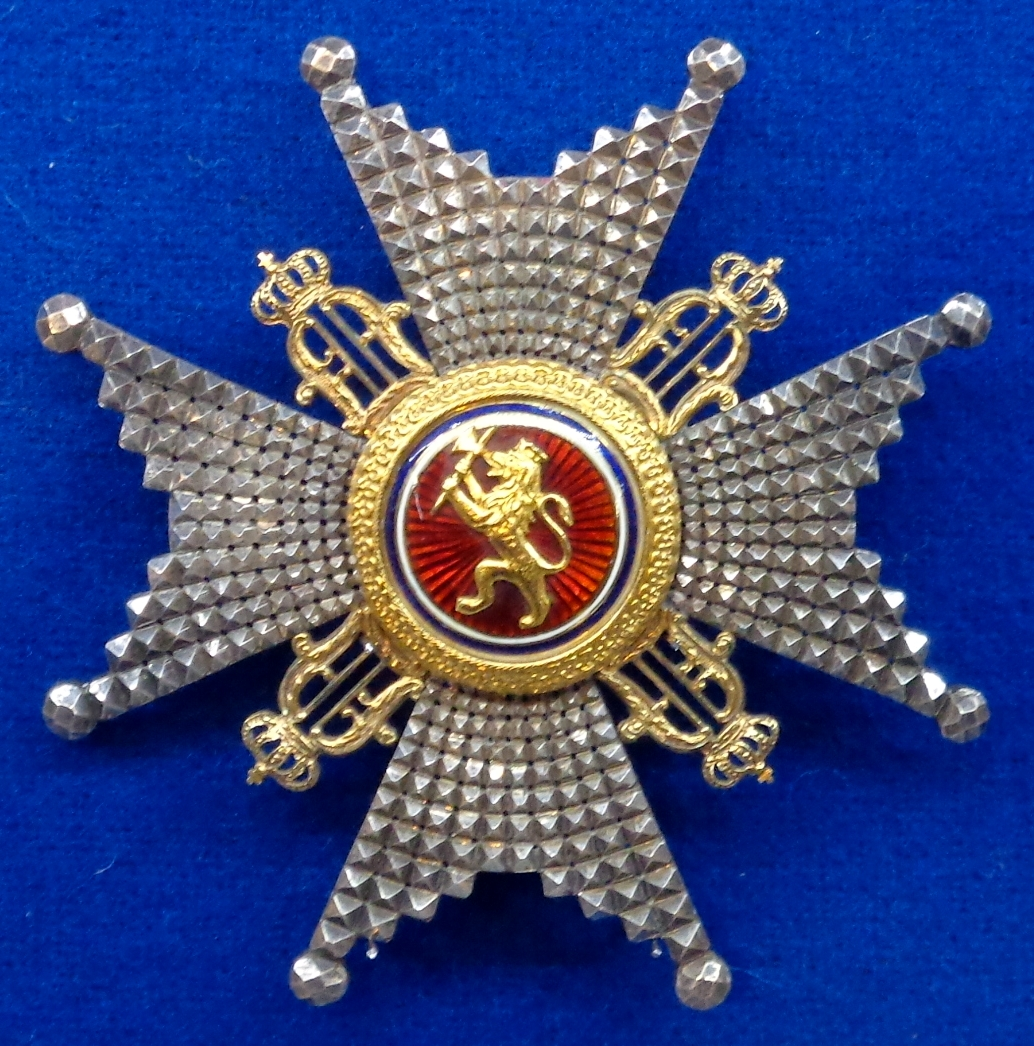
Order of St. Olav Grand Officer Star - 1st Type

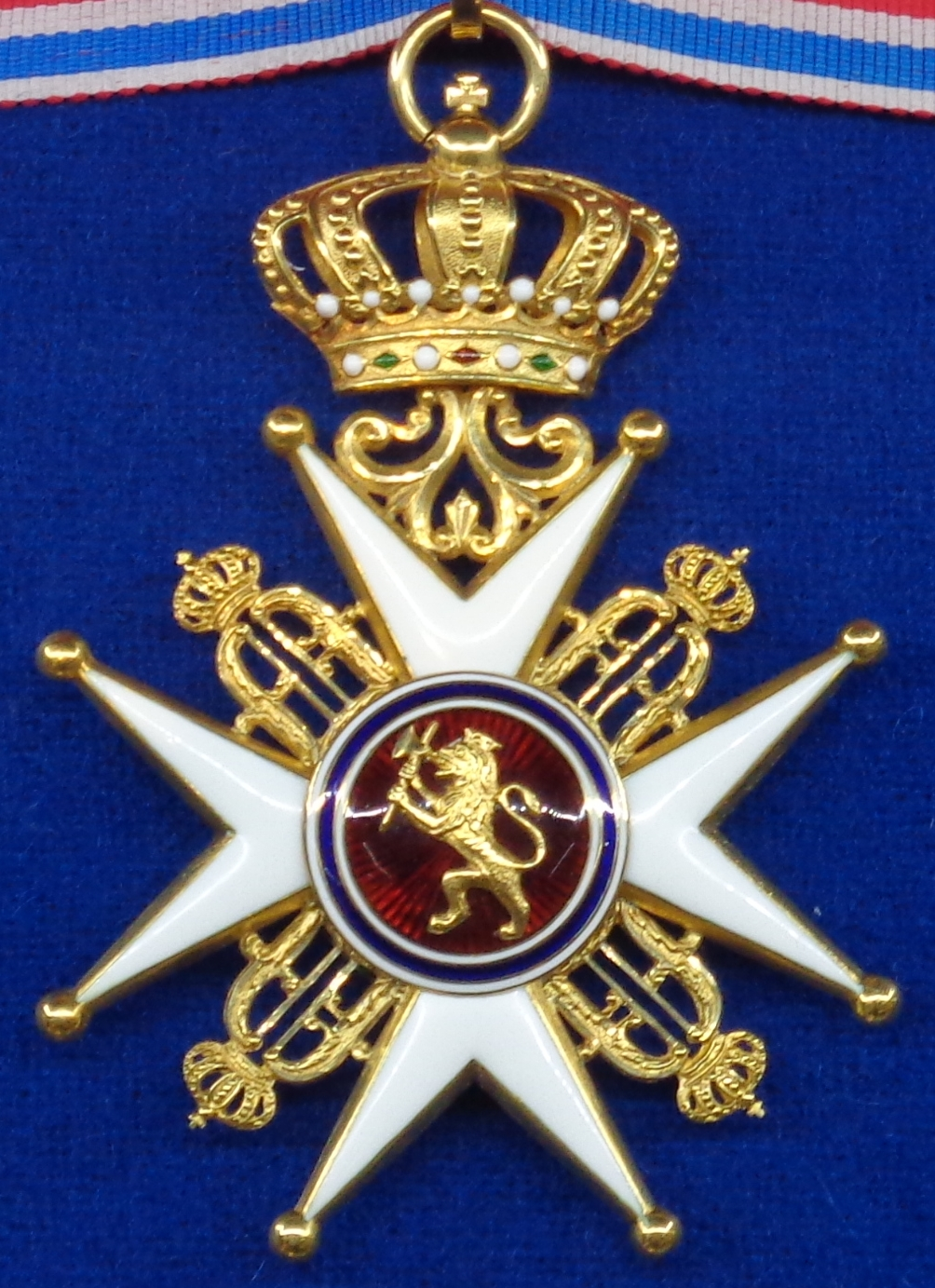
Order of St. Olav Grand Officer Badge - 1st Type

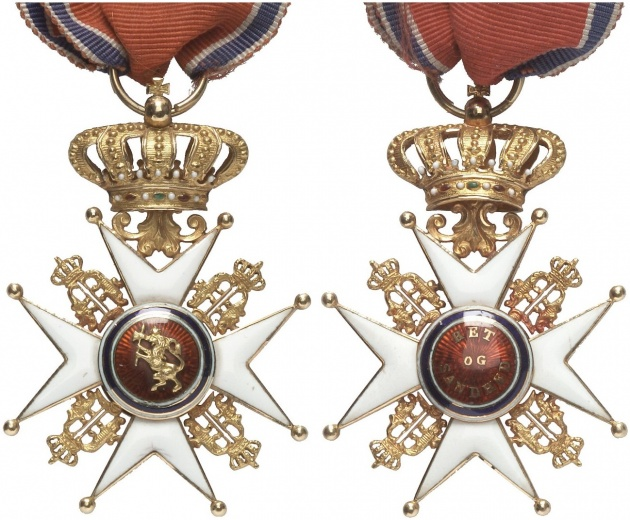
Order of St. Olav Knight - 1st Type

== See also ==
- Orders, decorations, and medals of Norway
- St. Olav's Medal
