= Lord Chamberlain (Norway) =

Official of the Norwegian Royal Court

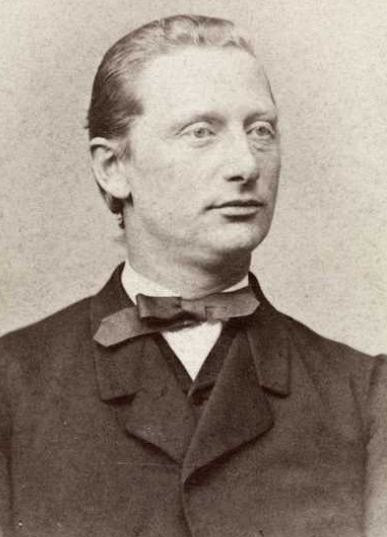
Theodor Christian Brun Frølich, Lord Chamberlain from 1890 to 1904

The Lord Chamberlain of Norway (Norwegian: hoffsjef) is a traditional officer of the Royal Household of Norway. The title was introduced in 1866. In Denmark the equivalent title is Hofmarskallen (the Court Marshal), and in Sweden it is Förste Hovmarskalken (the First Marshal of the Court).

The Lord Chamberlain of Norway is the highest administrative leader at the Royal Court and is responsible for the business vis-à-vis the King. The chief justice has the ultimate responsibility for personnel matters, the court's organization and operations, and has ceremonial and protocol duties. The court chief is a member of the council of the Order of St. Olav, where they are the treasurer. In the Royal Norwegian Order of Merit, the head of court is the chancellor of the order. In Norway, the court marshal is subordinate to the head of the court and functions as head of finance and administration at the court.

== Lords Chamberlain of Norway ==
- 1815–1870: Herman Severin Løvenskiold
- 1890-1904: Theodor Christian Brun Frølich
- 1904–1925: Fritz Rustad
- 1926–1931: Jacob Roll Knagenhjelm
- 1931–1945: Peder Anker Wedel Jarlsberg
- 1945–1954: Peter Fredrik Broch
- 1955–1966: Ingvald Smith-Kielland
- 1966–1985: Odd Grønvold
- 1985–1991: Ingvald M. Smith-Kielland
- 1991–1993: Kaare Langlete
- 1993–1996: Sivert Farstad
- 1996–2004: Lars Petter Forberg
- 2004–2009: Rolf Trolle Andersen
- 2009–2015: Åge Bernhard Grutle
- 2015–2022: Gry Mølleskog
- 2022–present: Olav Heian-Engdal

== See also ==
- Chamberlain (office)
- Norwegian order of precedence
- Marshal
- Court appointment
