= Ferdinand Nicolai Roll =

Norwegian jurist and politician

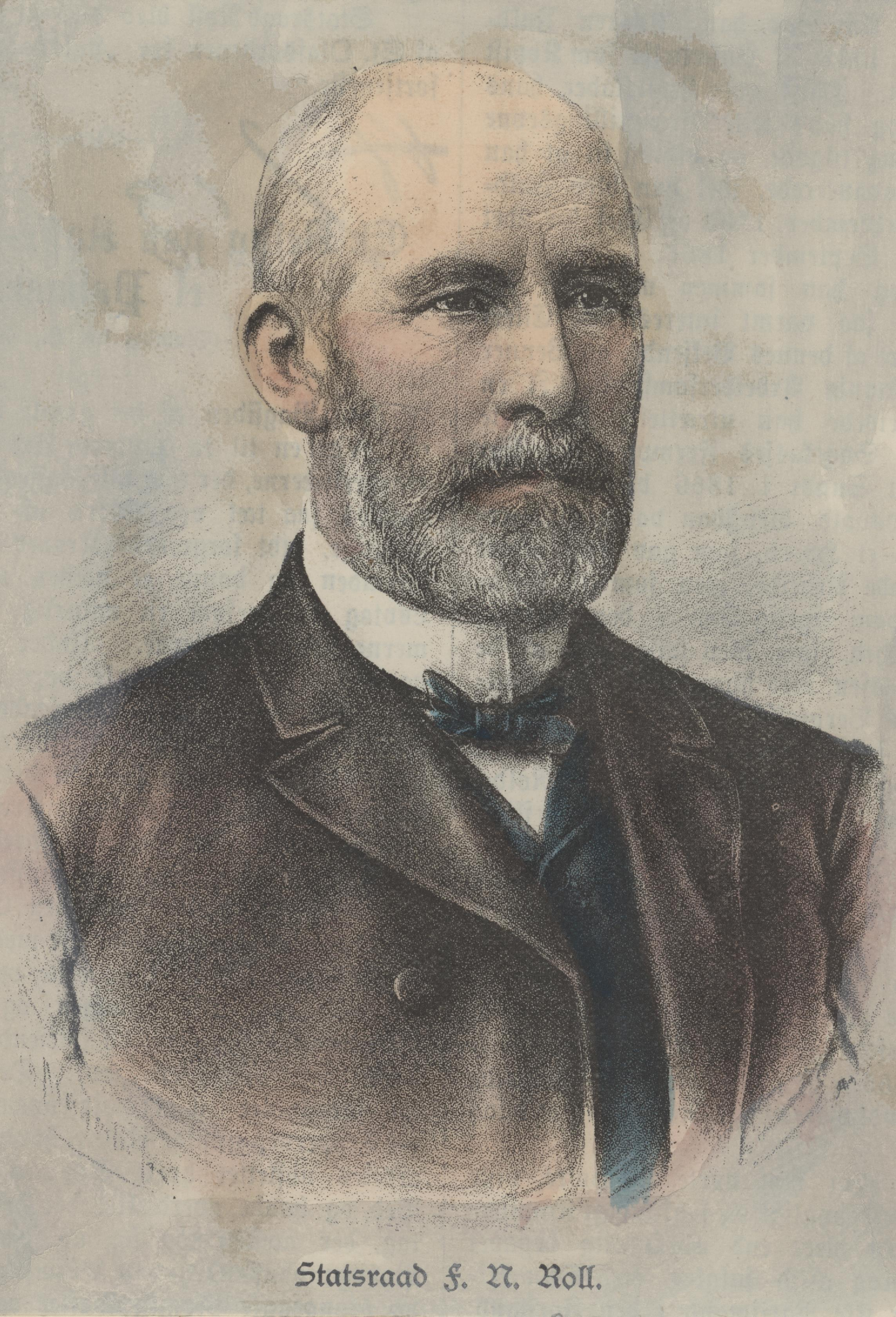
Ferdinand Nicolai Roll

Ferdinand Nicolai Roll (28 May 1831 – 28 February 1921) was a Norwegian jurist and politician for the Conservative Party.

He was born in Trondhjem as the son of judge and politician Jacob Roll and his third wife Nicoline Selmer. He had three siblings. Like his father, he took a law education, enrolling as a student in 1847 and graduating as cand.jur. in 1852.

In 1870 he was appointed district stipendiary magistrate (sorenskriver) in Romsdalens Amt. He resided in Molde. While stationed here, he was elected to the Norwegian Parliament in 1877, representing the constituency of Aalesund og Molde. He was re-elected in 1880 and 1883.

When the first cabinet Stang assumed office in 1889, Roll was brought in as a part of the executive branch of government. He was appointed Minister of Justice and the Police on 13 July. He left on 30 June 1890 to become a member of the Council of State Division in Stockholm the next day, leaving that position on 5 March 1891.

In 1892 he was elected for a final term in Parliament. He was also appointed Supreme Court Assessor.

He was the father of Nini Roll Anker, a feminist writer.

Political offices
Preceded by Walter Scott Dahl	Norwegian Minister of Justice and the Police; 1889–1890	Succeeded by Ulrik Frederik Christian Arneberg
