= Jacob Roll (born 1783) =

Norwegian politician

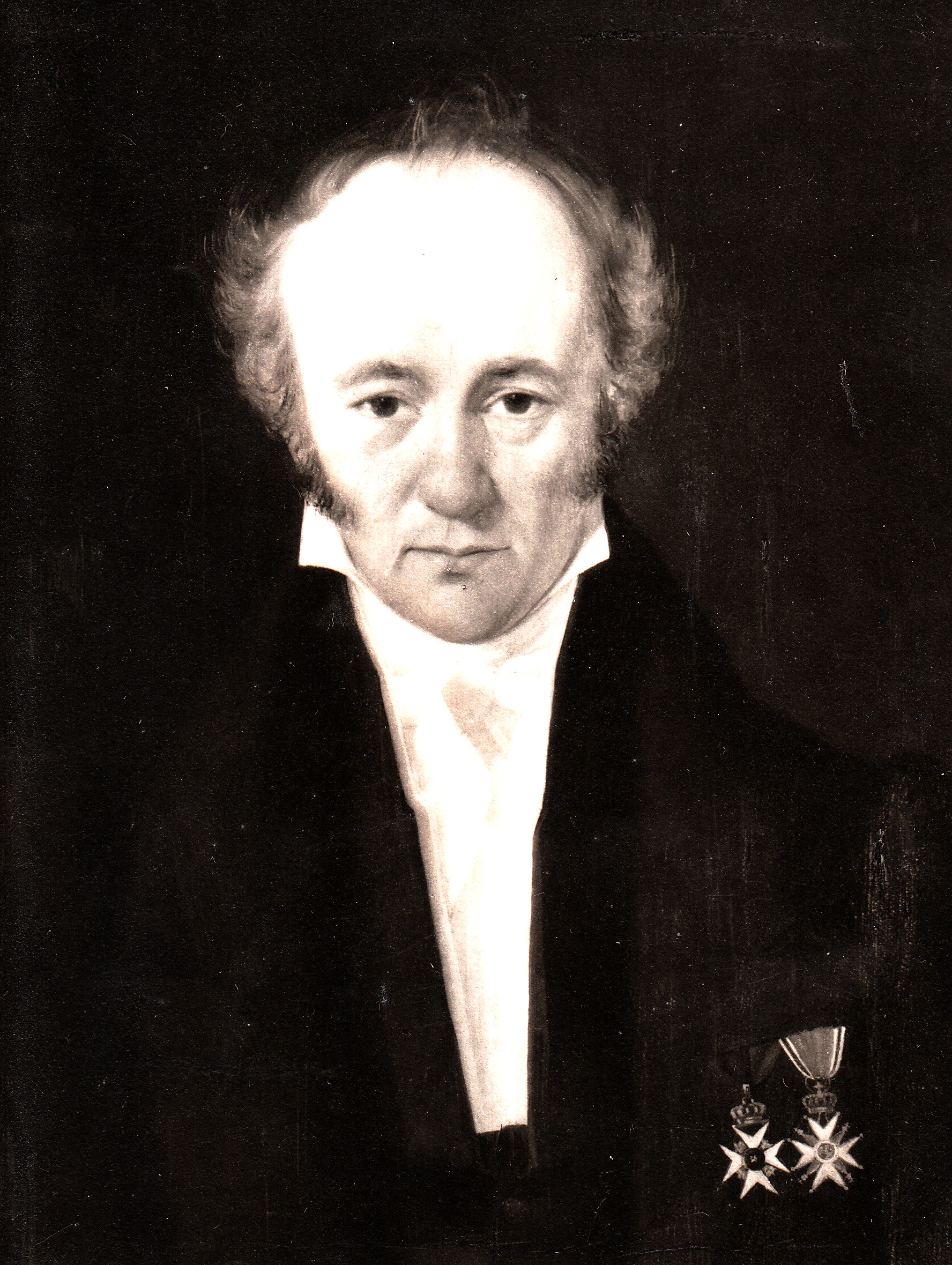
Jacob Roll

Jacob Roll (17 May 1783 – 7 March 1870) was a Norwegian judge and politician.

He was born in Spydeberg. He was the Chief Justice of Trondhjem Diocesan Court from 1828 to 1855. He was also the first Mayor of Trondhjem. He was elected to the Parliament of Norway in 1833, 1836 and 1842, representing his city. He was also a deputy representative in 1821.

He was the father of Ferdinand Nicolai Roll and Oluf Nicolai Roll.

Preceded by position created	Mayor of Trondheim; 1837–1838	Succeeded by Balthazar Schnitler
Preceded by Balthazar Schnitler	Mayor of Trondheim; 1838–1839	Succeeded by Balthazar Schnitler
