= Culture of Norway =

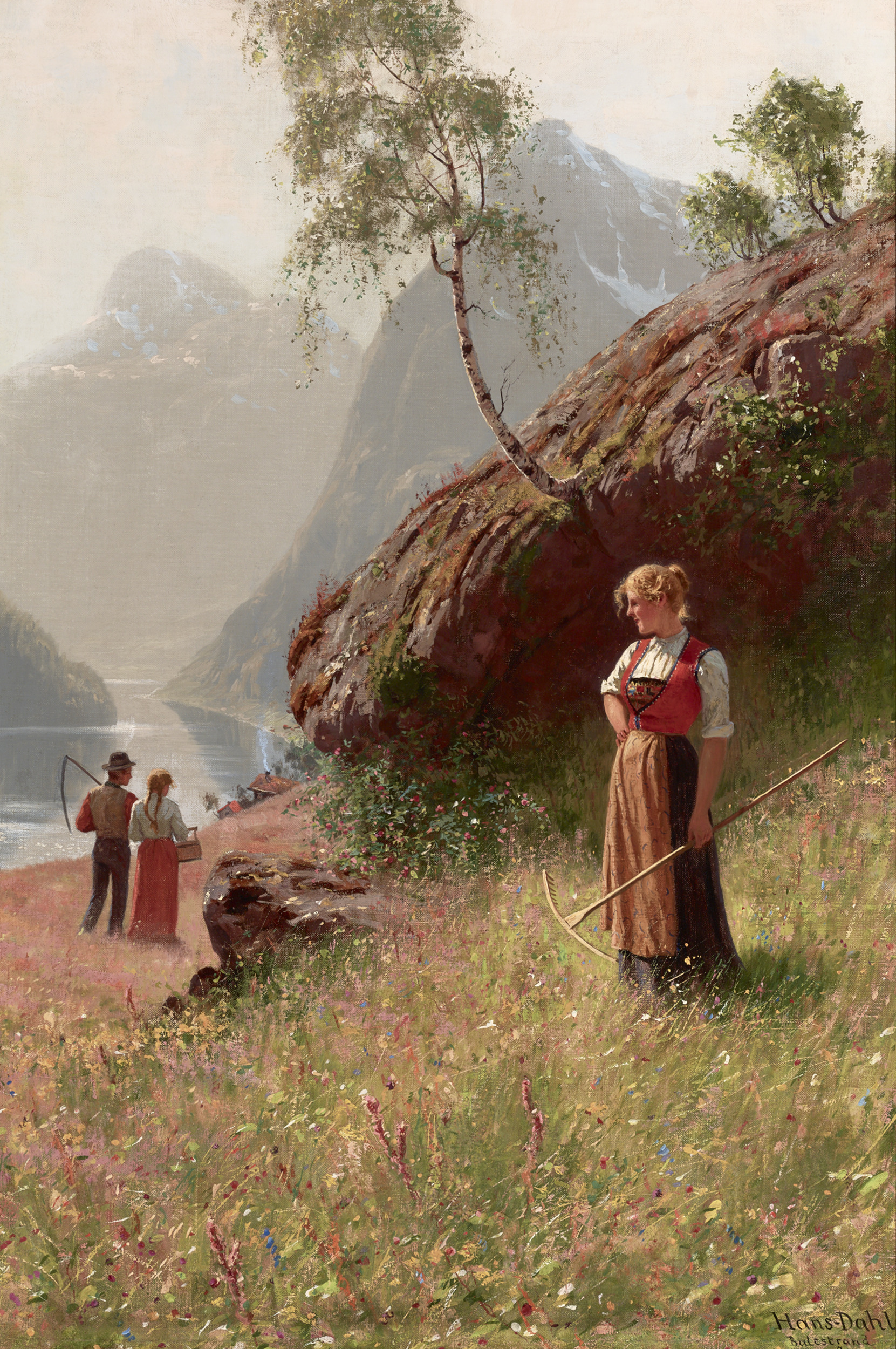
On the Fjord by Hans Dahl (c. 1900)

The culture of Norway is closely linked to the country's history and geography. The unique Norwegian farm culture, sustained to this day, has resulted not only from scarce resources and a harsh climate but also from ancient property laws. In the 19th century, it brought about a strong romantic nationalistic movement, which is still visible in the Norwegian language and media. In the 19th century, Norwegian culture blossomed as efforts continued to achieve an independent identity in the areas of literature, art and music. This continues today in the performing arts and as a result of government support for exhibitions, cultural projects and artwork.

== Cuisine ==
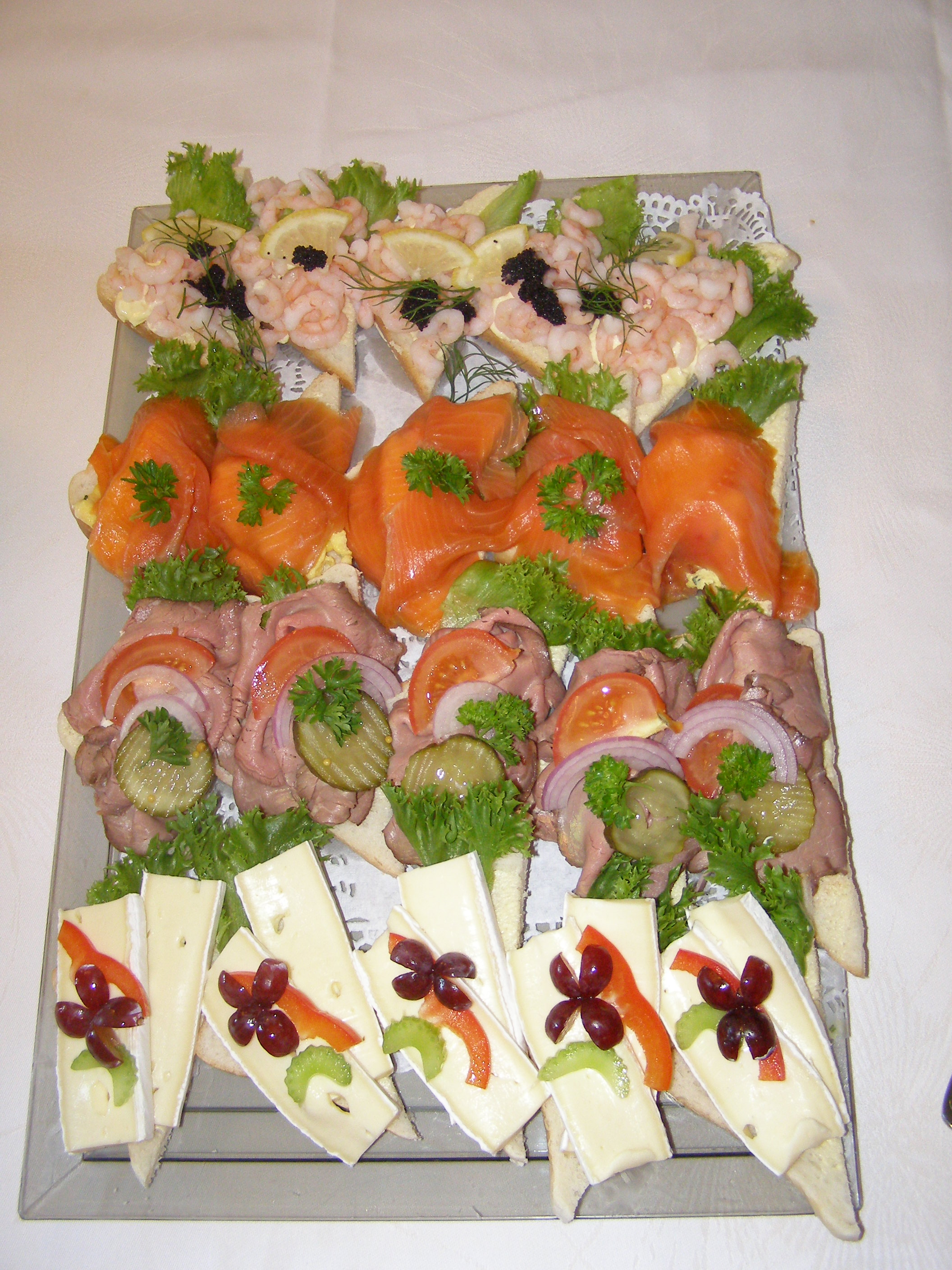
Smørbrød, Norwegian open sandwiches

Norway's food traditions show the influence of sea farming and farming the land, traditions with salmon, herring, trout, cod, and other sea food, balanced by cheese, dairy products and breads. Lefse is a common Norwegian wheat or potato flatbread, eaten around Christmas. Typical Norwegian dishes include: Rakfisk, smalahove, pinnekjøtt, Krotekake, Kompe (also called raspeball) and fårikål.

== Fine arts ==
=== Literature and drama ===
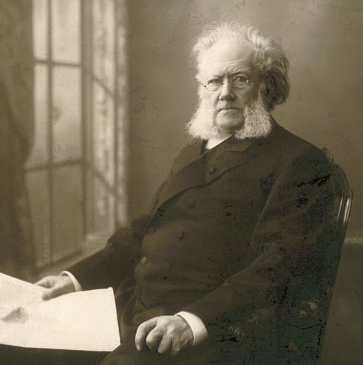
Henrik Ibsen, c. 1890

Four Norwegian authors have been awarded the Nobel Prize in Literature: Bjørnstjerne Bjørnson in 1903, Knut Hamsun in 1920, Sigrid Undset in 1928 for Kristin Lavransdatter, and Jon Fosse in 2023. Though he was not awarded a Nobel Prize for his plays, as the first of these were awarded after he published his last play in 1899, playwright Henrik Ibsen is probably the best known figure in Norwegian literature. Ibsen wrote plays such as Peer Gynt, A Doll's House, Hedda Gabler, and The Lady from the Sea. Other Norwegian writers from the realistic era include Jonas Lie and Alexander Kielland, who are along with Bjørnstjerne Bjørnson and Henrik Ibsen regarded as the "four greats" of Norwegian literature.

Also of importance to the Norwegian literary culture is the Norse literature, and in particular the works of Snorri Sturluson, as well as the more recent folk tales, collected by Peter Asbjørnsen and Jørgen Moe in the 19th century.

Norwegian literature attained international acclaim in the 1990s with Jostein Gaarder's novel Sophie's World (Sofies verden), which was translated into 40 languages. Other noteworthy writers with an international profile include Erik Fosnes Hansen (Psalm at Journey's End), Karl Ove Knausgård (My Struggle), and Åsne Seierstad whose controversial work, The Bookseller of Kabul, was particularly successful in 2003.

=== Architecture ===
Norway has always had a tradition of building with wood. Many of today's most popular new buildings are made of wood, reflecting the strong appeal that this material continues to hold for Norwegian designers and builders.

In the early Middle Ages, stave churches were constructed throughout Norway. Many of them remain to this day and represent Norway's most important contribution to architectural history. A fine example is The Stave Church at Urnes which is now on UNESCO's World Heritage List. Another notable example of wooden architecture is Bryggen (the wharf) in Bergen, consisting of a row of narrow wooden structures along the quayside.

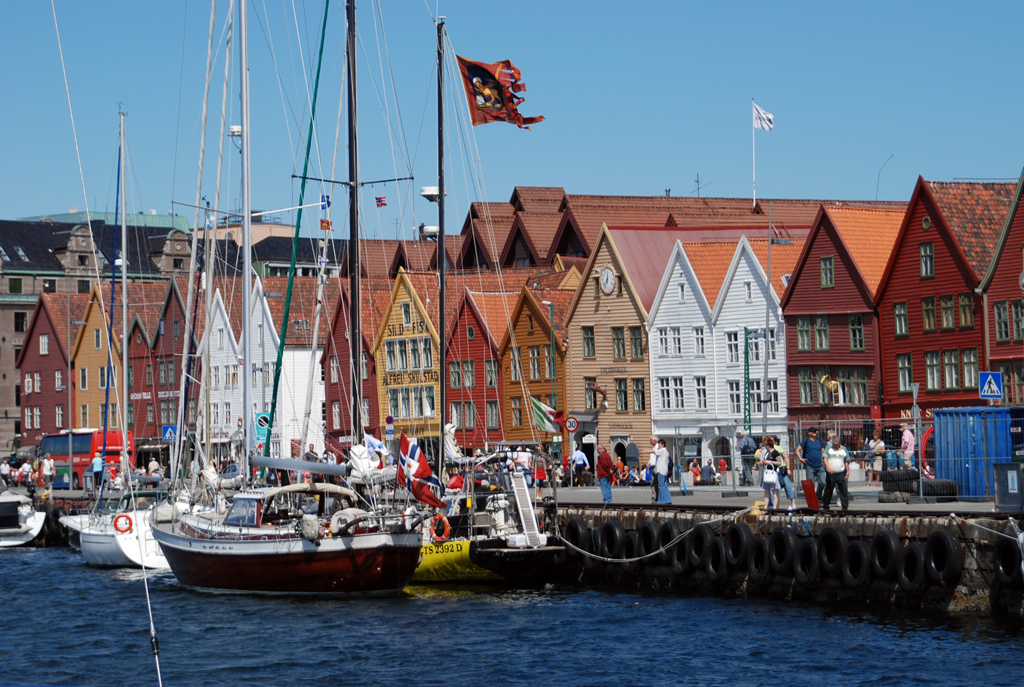
Historical quarter of Bryggen in Bergen

In the 17th century, under the Danish monarchy, cities such as Kongsberg with its Baroque church and Røros with its wooden buildings were established.

After Norway's union with Denmark was dissolved in 1814, Oslo became the capital. Architect Christian H. Grosch designed the oldest parts of the University of Oslo, the Oslo Stock Exchange, and many other buildings and churches.

At the beginning of the 20th century, the city of Ålesund was rebuilt in the Art Nouveau style. The 1930s, when functionalism dominated, became a strong period for Norwegian architecture, but it is only in recent decades that Norwegian architects have truly achieved international renown. One of the most striking modern buildings in Norway is the Sami Parliament in Kárášjohka designed by Stein Halvarson and Christian Sundby. Its debating chamber is an abstract timber version of a Lavvo, the traditional tent used by the nomadic Sami people.

=== Art ===
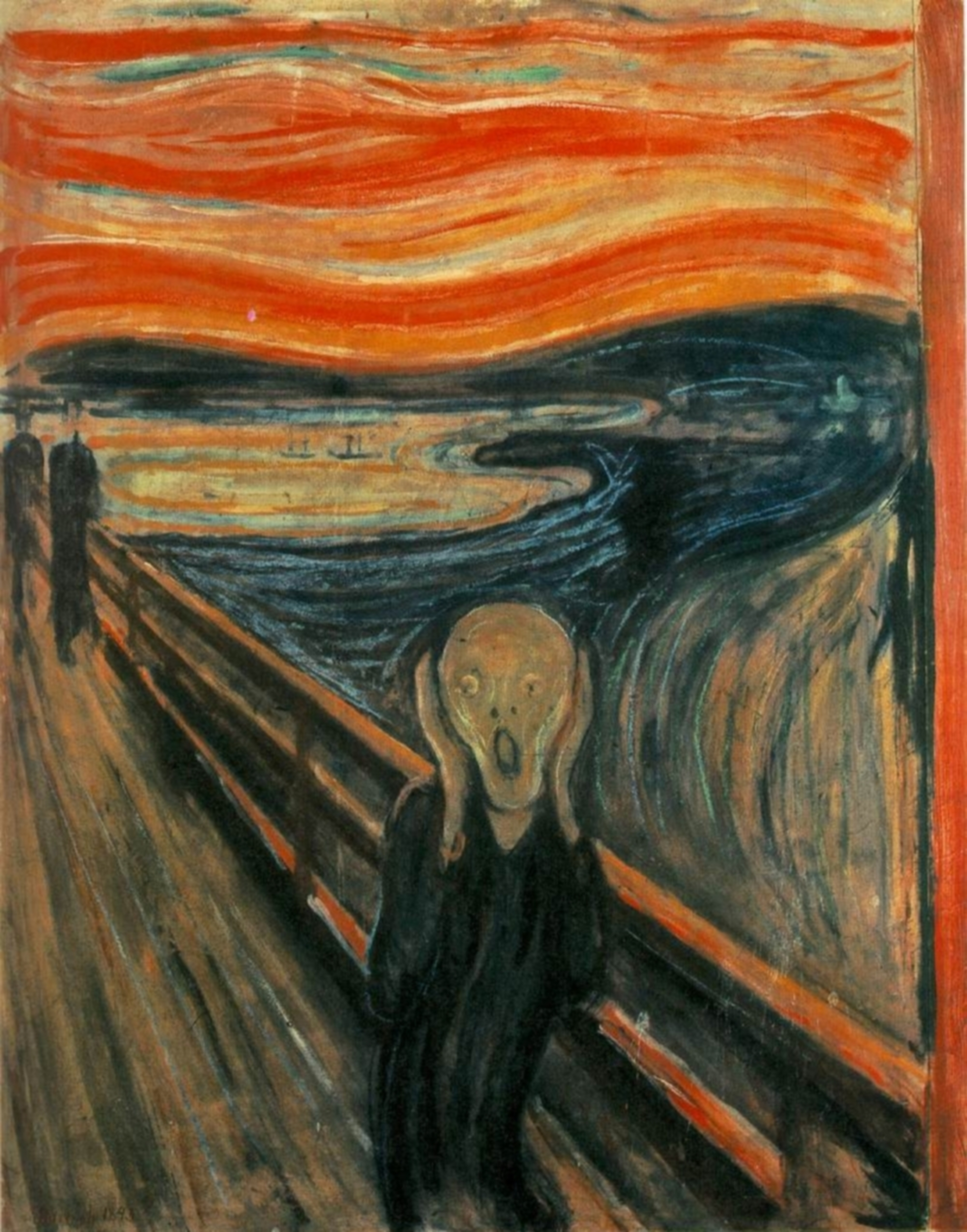
Edvard Munch's The Scream (1893)

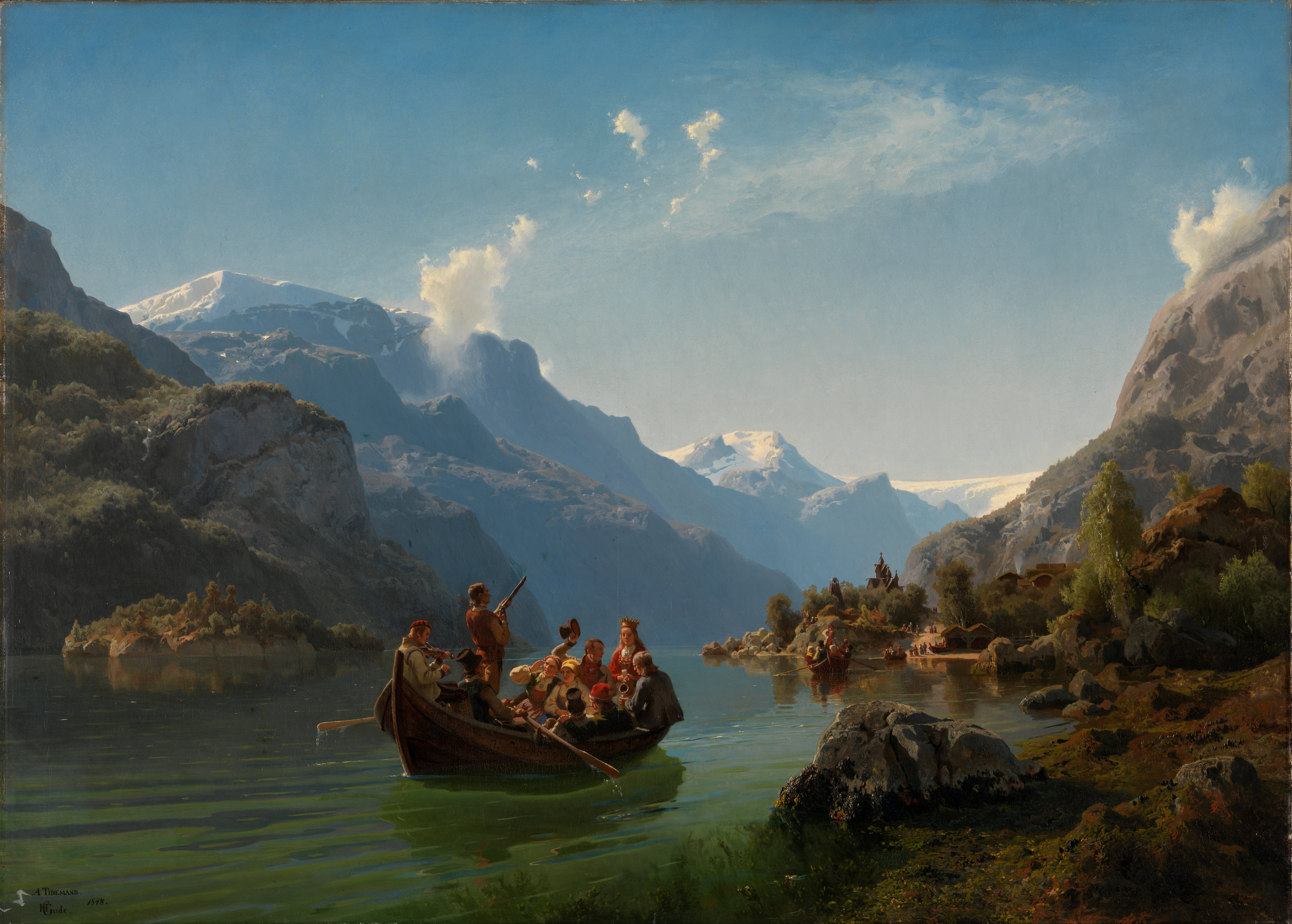
Brudeferden i Hardanger

For an extended period, the Norwegian art scene was dominated by artwork from Germany and Holland as well as by the influence of Copenhagen. It was in the 19th century that a truly Norwegian era began, first with portraits, later with even more impressive landscapes. Johan Christian Dahl (1788–1857), originally from the Dresden school, eventually returned to paint the landscapes of west Norway, defining Norwegian painting for the first time."

Norway's new-found independence from Denmark encouraged painters to develop their Norwegian identity, especially with landscape painting by artists such as Kitty Kielland (1843–1914), an early female painter who studied under Gude: Harriet Backer (1845–1932), another pioneer among female artists, influenced by impressionism. Frits Thaulow (1847–1906), an impressionist, was influenced by the art scene in Paris as was Christian Krohg (1852–1925), a realist painter, known for his paintings of prostitutes.

Of particular note is Edvard Munch (1863–1944), a symbolist/expressionist painter whose The Scream is said to represent the anxiety of modern man.

Other artists of note include Harald Sohlberg (1869–1935), a neo-romantic painter remembered for his paintings of Røros and Odd Nerdrum, (born 1944), a figurative painter who maintains his work is not art but kitsch.

=== Photography ===
The oldest Norwegian photograph is from Hans Thøger Winther dating back to 1840. Marcus Selmer is considered to be the first dedicated landscape photographer but Knud Knudsen and the Swede Axel Lindahl are remembered for their extensive travels aimed at capturing landscapes.

From the late 19th century until World War I, photographers set up shop throughout Norway. A remarkably large number of women were among them. In 1901, Anders Beer Wilse returned from Seattle and established a photography career in Norway. Although dominated primarily by German influences in the late 19th century, pictorialism caught on in Norway as it did elsewhere in the world and was promoted by the Oslo camera club, founded in 1921. The pictorialists include Robert Collett, Aage Remfeldt, Thomas Blehr, and Waldemar Eide.

Around World War I, portrait photography in Norway became more of an expressive art as a result of the work of Waldemar Eide, Dimitri Koloboff, Gunnar Theodor Sjøwall, Aage Remfeldt, Hans Johnsrud and Anders Beer Wilse.

In 1971, the first photographic work (by Kåre Kivijärvi) was accepted at the prestigious Autumn Exhibition in Oslo, marking the widespread acceptance of photography as an art form.

=== Film ===
Not until fairly recently has the Norwegian cinema received international recognition but as early as 1959, Arne Skouen's Nine Lives was in fact nominated for an Oscar. Pinchcliffe Grand Prix, an animated feature film directed by Ivo Caprino and released in 1975, is based on characters from Norwegian cartoonist Kjell Aukrust. It is the most widely seen Norwegian film of all time.

There was, however, a real breakthrough in 1987 with Nils Gaup's Pathfinder, which told the story of the Sami. It was nominated for an Oscar and was a huge international success. Berit Nesheim's The Other Side of Sunday was also nominated for an Oscar in 1997.

Since the 1990s, the film industry has thrived with up to 20 feature films each year. Particular successes were Kristin Lavransdatter, The Telegraphist, and Gurin with the Foxtail. Knut Erik Jensen was among the more successful new directors, together with Erik Skjoldbjaerg (remembered for Insomnia). Norwegian artist and filmmaker Ole Mads Sirks Vevle received the critics award at the Cannes Film Festival in 2003 for his short film Love is the Law.

Since the turn of the 21st century, there have been a number of successful Norwegian films. These include:

- Erik Poppe's Hawaii, Oslo (2004), depicting an imaginative multiracial Oslo without stereotypes
- Sara Johnsen's Kissed by Winter (2005), in which a female doctor in a small village finds the body of a young Iranian in the snow
- Erik Skjoldbjærg's An Enemy of the People (2005), about a TV celebrity who tries to produce the world's purest bottled water
- Roar Uthaug's Cold Prey (2006), hailed as one of the best modern Norwegian horror movies
- Sentimental Value (2025), directed by Joachim Trier, won the Grand Prix at the 2025 Cannes Film Festival and the Academy Award for Best International Feature Film at the 2026 Academy Awards.

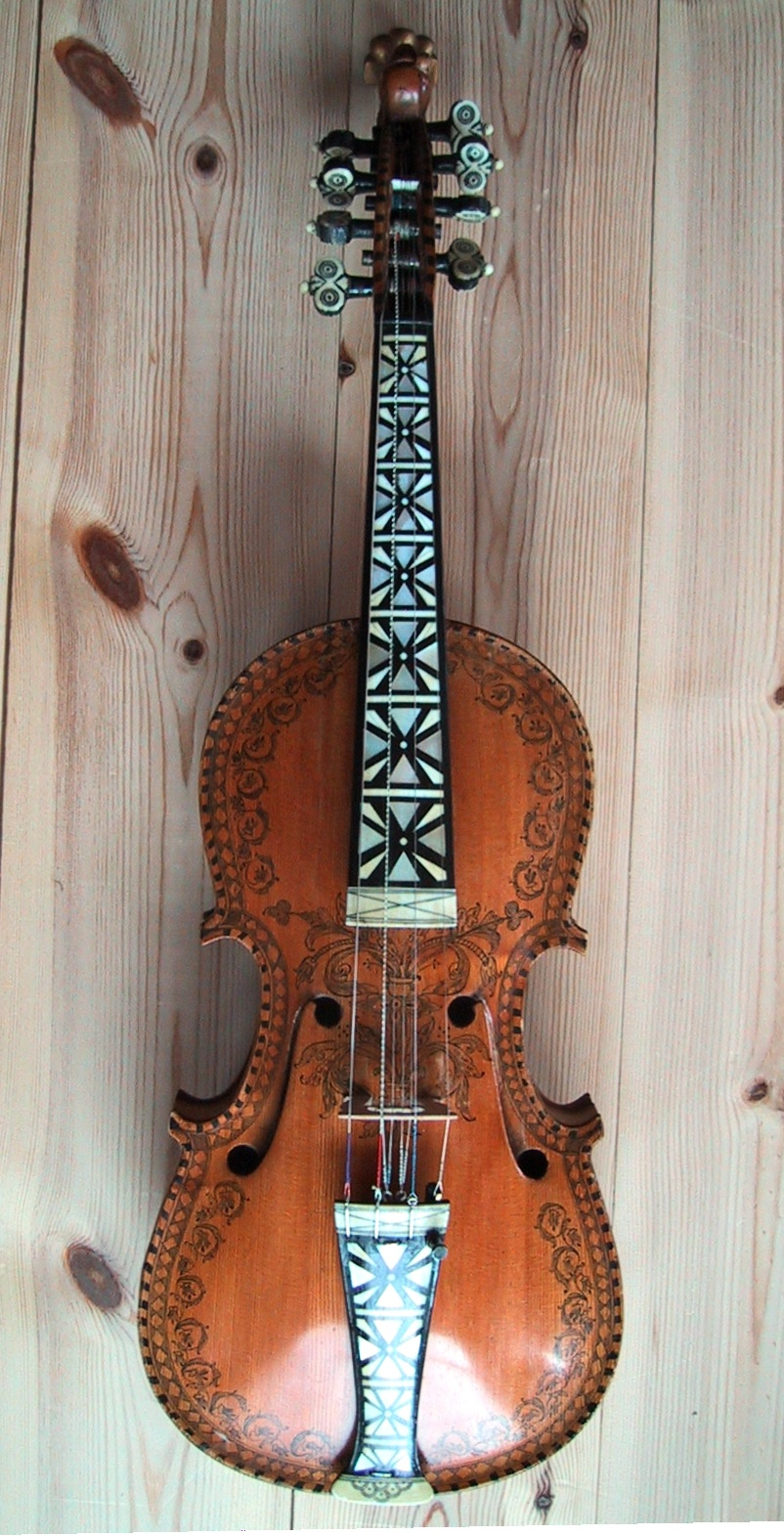
Norwegian Hardanger fiddle

=== Music ===
Along with the classical music of romantic composer Edvard Grieg and the modern music of Arne Nordheim, Norwegian black metal has become something of an export article in recent years..

Norway's classical performers include Leif Ove Andsnes, a pianists, and Truls Mørk, a cellist.

Regarding pop music, Norway has in the recent years had many international popular artists such as a-ha, Sigrid, Kygo, Matoma and Aurora.

The jazz scene in Norway is also thriving; Karin Krog, Terje Rypdal, Jan Garbarek, Jon Christensen, Arild Andersen, and piano playing writer Ketil Bjørnstad, followed by Mari Boine, Sidsel Endresen, Bugge Wesseltoft, Nils Petter Molvær, Eivind Aarset and Rebekka Bakken are internationally recognised. Paal Nilssen-Love, Sturle Dagsland and ensembles like Supersilent, Jaga Jazzist, and Wibutee represent a younger generation.

Norway has a strong folk music tradition that remains popular to this day. Among the most prominent folk musicians are Hardanger fiddlers Andrea Een, Olav Jørgen Hegge, Vidar Lande and Annbjørg Lien, violinist Susanne Lundeng, and vocalists Agnes Buen Garnås, Kirsten Bråten Berg, and Odd Nordstoga.

== National traditions ==
=== Celebrations and holidays ===
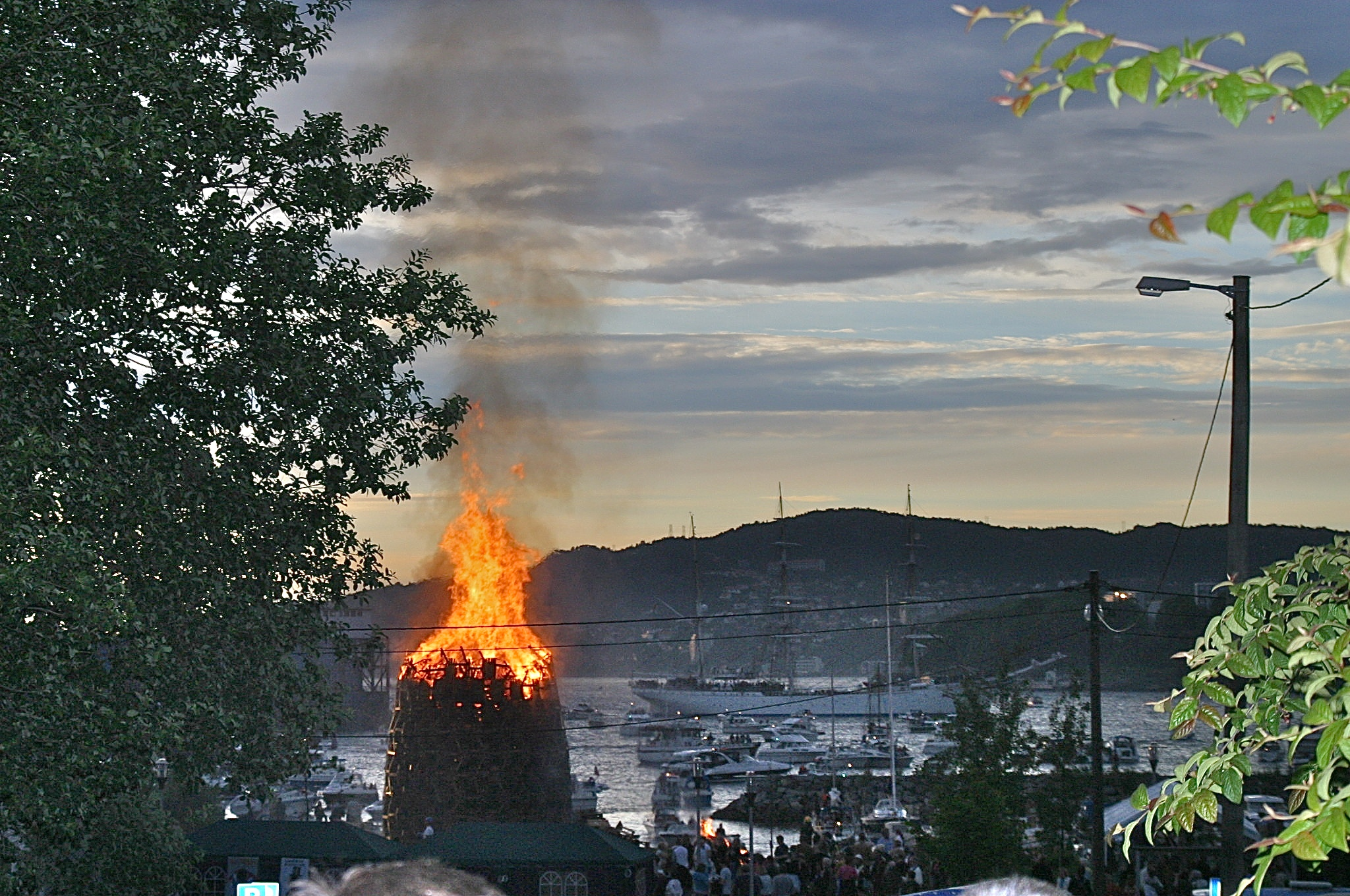
Traditional Norwegian St. Hansbål (midsummer) bonfire in Laksevåg, Bergen Municipality

Norwegians celebrate their National Day on 17 May, dedicated to the Constitution of Norway. Many people wear bunad (traditional costumes) and most participate in or watch the Norwegian Constitution Day parade, consisting mostly of children, through the cities and towns. The national romanticist author Henrik Wergeland was the founder of 17 May parade. Jonsok (St. John's Passing), or St. Hans (St. John's Day), in June is also celebrated. Common Christian holidays are also celebrated, the most important being Christmas (called Jul or jol in Norway after the pagan and early Viking winter solstice) and Easter (Påske).

=== Leisure ===
Physical culture is important in Norway. With abundant forests and mountain plateaus, and extensive coastal areas and rivers, Norway has a natural environment which encourages outdoor sports, inclusive of hiking. Many Norwegians own ski equipment, and are active in mountain touring.

=== Cultural institutions ===
Norway has a variety of cultural institutions, including the National Museum of Art, Architecture and Design, the National Library, and smaller galleries and libraries across the country. In recent years, the Norwegian Archive, Library and Museum Authority has encouraged synergies between the cultural institutions and local municipalities, affecting schools, historical understandings, and community interests.

== See also ==
- Arts Council Norway Honorary Award
- Philharmonic Orchestras in Norway
  - Bergen Philharmonic Orchestra
  - Oslo Philharmonic Orchestra
- Norwegian knitting
  - Lusekofte
- Rosemaling
- Norwegian Year of Cultural Heritage 2009
- Sport in Norway
- Whaling in Norway
- Jante Law
- List of museums in Norway
