= Kjærlighet =

Kjærlighet may refer to:

- Kjærlighet, the Norwegian word for love
- Kjærlighetskarusellen, a public urinal in Oslo, Norway
- Kjærlighet paa pinde, a Norwegian silent film
- Kjærlighet og vennskap, a 1941 Norwegian film
- Kjærlighet aka Love, a 2024 Norwegian film
