= Norwegian romantic nationalism =

Movement in Norway between 1840 and 1867

Norwegian National Romanticism (Norwegian: Nasjonalromantikken) was a movement in Norway between 1840 and 1867 in art, literature, and popular culture that emphasized the aesthetics of Norwegian nature and the uniqueness of the Norwegian national identity. A subject of much study and debate in Norway, it was characterized by nostalgia.

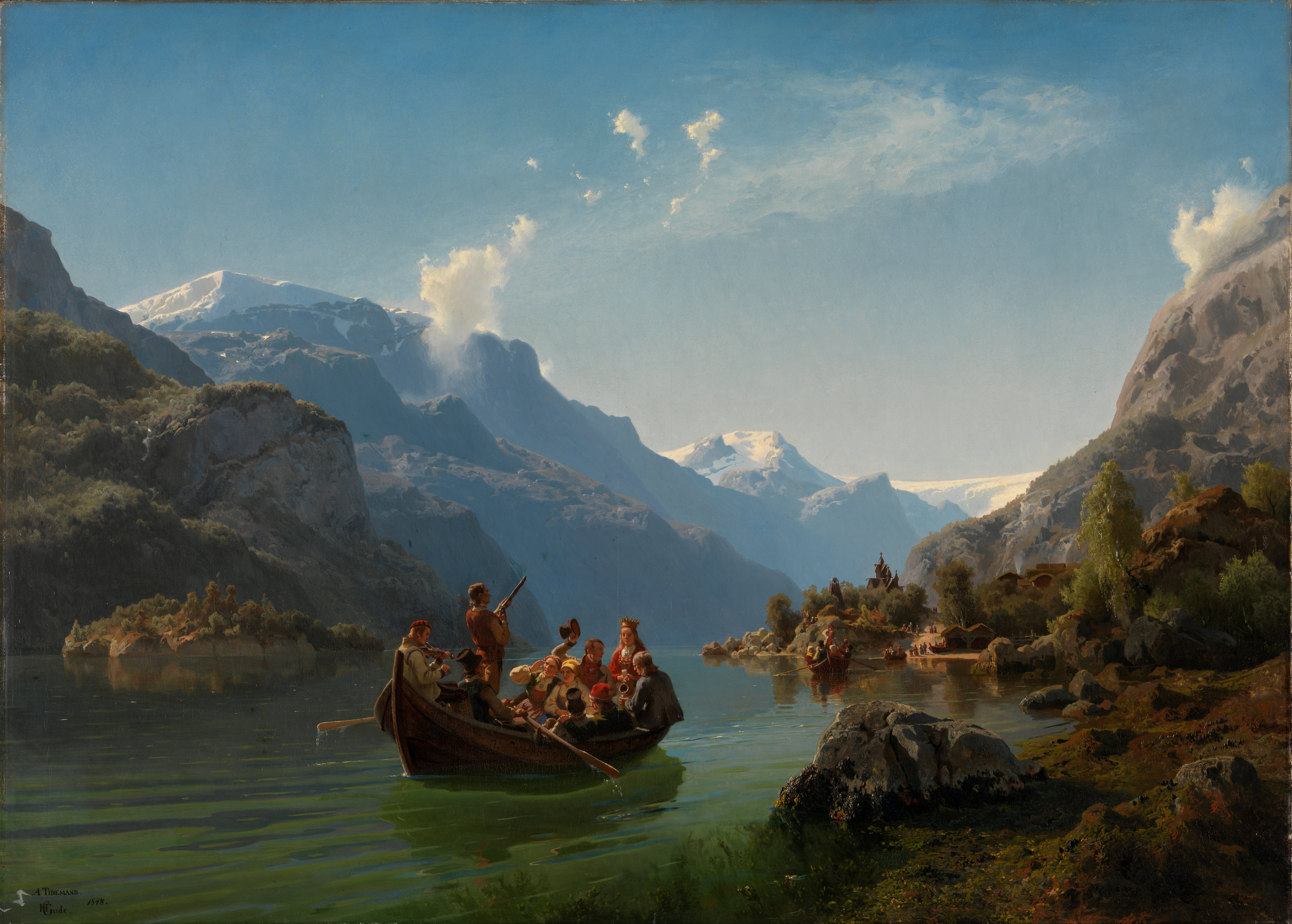
Bridal Procession on the Hardangerfjord (Brudeferd i Hardanger), a monumental piece within Norwegian romantic nationalism. Painted by Hans Gude and Adolph Tidemand.

== Background ==
The context and impact of Norwegian romantic nationalism derived from recent history and the political situation. Following the Black Plague, Norway became dependent on Denmark and Copenhagen was made capital of both countries in a personal union. Subsequently, there was a brain drain of talented people from Norway to Denmark, who studied in Copenhagen and became intellectuals and cultural icons in Denmark, most famously Ludvig Holberg. After more than 400 years as a dependent lesser part in the Denmark-Norway union treated as a cultural backwater by the absentee government in Copenhagen, the only uniquely Norwegian culture was found among the farmers and peasants in rural districts in Norway; Norway had in 1814 gained a partial independence in a personal union with the Kingdom of Sweden.

For Norwegians, having reasserted their political aspirations in 1814, the question of a distinct Norwegian identity became important. As urban culture gained prominence also in the rural districts, the rich cultural heritage of the Norwegian countryside came under threat. As a result, a number of individuals set out to collect the artifacts of the distinctly Norwegian culture, hoping thereby to preserve and promote a sense of Norwegian identity.

== Leading proponents ==
The best-known such collectors in the 1840s and 1850s were:

- Peter Christen Asbjørnsen and Jørgen Moe, who collected fairy tales and stories from most of the country;
- Magnus Brostrup Landstad and Olea Crøger, who collected folk songs particularly in upper Telemark;
- Ludvig Mathias Lindeman who collected folk tunes and laid the foundations for a separate Norwegian hymn tradition, distinct from the Danish and German psalms which until then had the greatest influence on Norwegian high music;
- Ivar Aasen, a linguist who conducted analyses of vocabulary, idioms, and grammar mostly from Western Norway and the mountainous valleys on the assumption that the original seeds of a Norwegian language were to be found there. He synthesized a grammar, vocabulary, and orthography for a separate Norwegian language that became the origin of Nynorsk. (See Norwegian language)

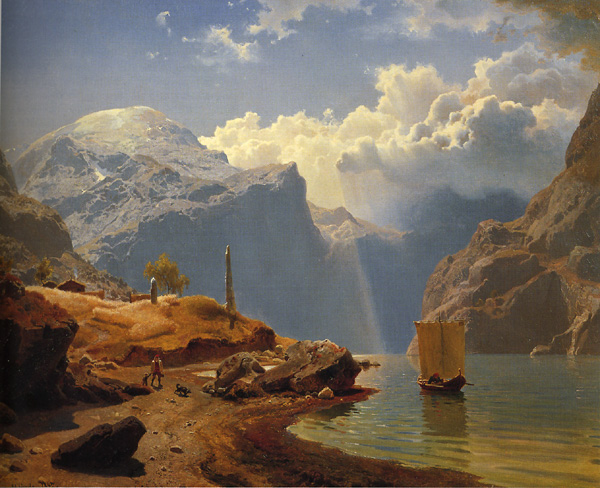
National romantic painting by Hans Gude, 1847

These achievements had an enduring impact on Norwegian culture and identity, an impact that can be witnessed in the influence on visual arts, classical music and literature, represented by e.g.:

- Painters Adolph Tidemand, Hans Gude, J.C. Dahl, August Cappelen;
- Writers Jørgen Moe, Peter Christen Asbjørnsen, Aasmund Olavsson Vinje, and also Bjørnstjerne Bjørnson and Henrik Ibsen in the beginning of their careers;
- Composers Ole Bull and Edvard Grieg.

== Later developments ==
In the waning days of the national romantic movement, efforts were renewed to collect rural buildings, handcrafts and arts. Arthur Hazelius, the founder of Nordiska Museet in Stockholm gathered (and arguably rescued) large collections and sent them to Sweden.

The last king of union between Sweden and Norway, Oscar II, was a supporter of this new wave of collecting, starting one of the oldest outdoor museums, the origins of Norsk Folkemuseum. He supported the manager of the Royal domains at Bygdøy, Christian Holst in his efforts to gather old buildings from the rural districts. Among the buildings that are still at the museum, the Gol stave church, moved here in the beginning of the 1880s, is the most prominent. Soon after other pioneers started equal efforts to rescue important pieces of traditional Norwegian architecture and handicraft. Anders Sandvig started the museum Maihaugen at Lillehammer. Hulda Garborg started the collecting of traditional folk costumes (bunad) and dances.

This effort is still underway, but became more systematic as other cultural movements took the center stage in Norway in the late 19th and early 20th century. Romantic nationalism has had an enormous impact on the Norwegian national identity. The Askeladden character from the fairy tales is considered being an integral part of the Norwegian way. On the Norwegian Constitution Day even in cities like Oslo and Bergen, a great proportion of people dress up in bunad for the parade, unthinkable 100 years ago.

== See also ==
- Norwegian nationalism
- Romanticism
- Romantic nationalism
- National Romantic style
