= Kjærlighetskarusellen =

Public toilet in Oslo, Norway

- Norwegian Cultural Heritage Site
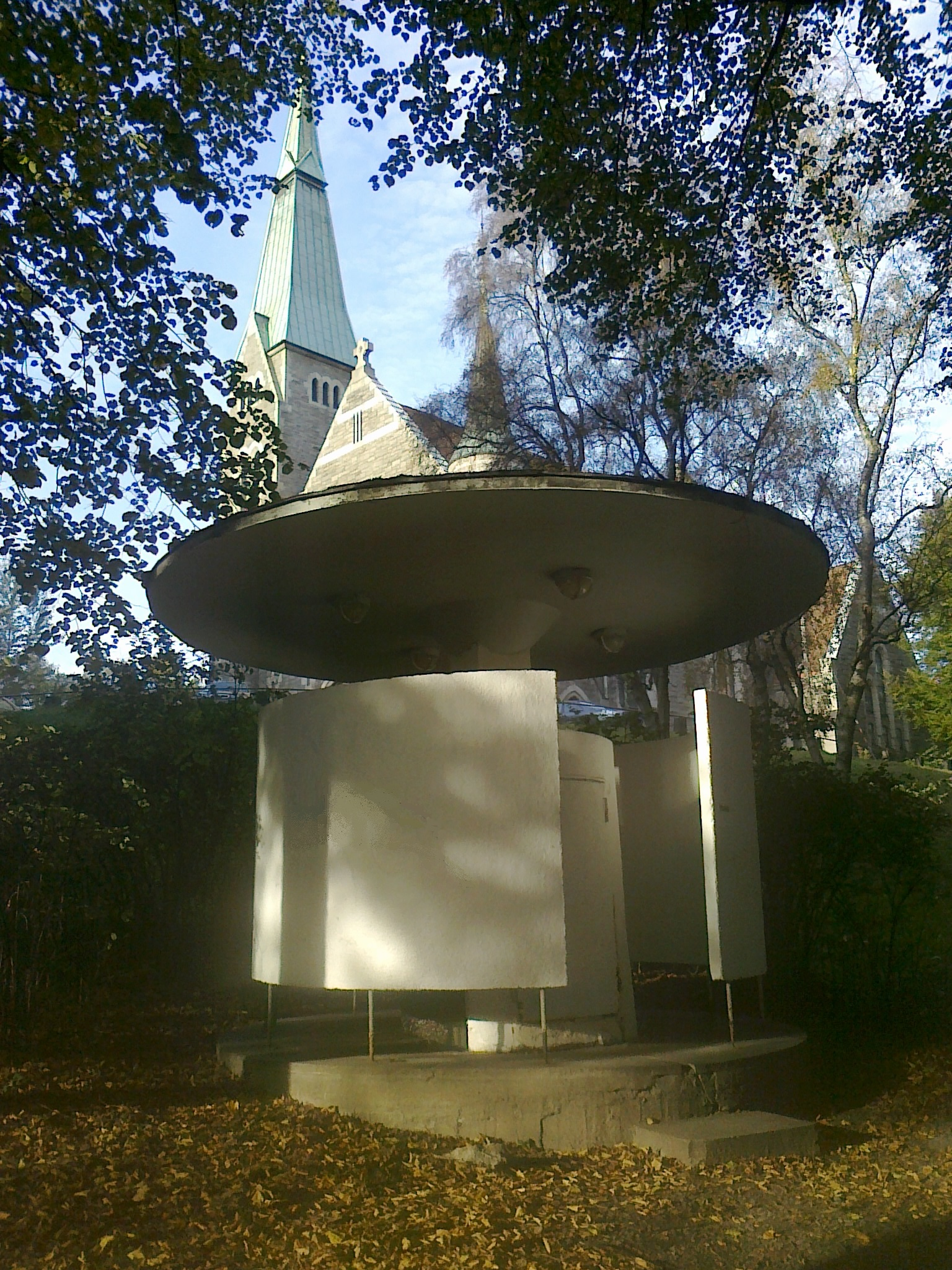
- Kjærlighetskarusellen, with Fagerborg Church in the background.
- Type: Locality
- Status: Protected by resolution
- County: Oslo
- Municipality: Oslo
- Coordinates: 59°55′36.12″N 10°43′46.75″E
- Year built: 1937
- ID: 122658

Kjærlighetskarusellen (English: The Carousel of Love) is a public urinal in Oslo, Norway, built in 1937. It is located in Stensparken park in the neighborhood of Fagerborg, St. Hanshaugen borough. The urinal, built in a functionalist style, was used as a meeting place for homosexual men, in a time when homosexuality was both socially unacceptable and illegal in Norway. Its reputation as a place for gay cruising, combined with its round shape, gave it its nickname. Other nicknames included "The Wheel of Fortune", "The Round Barrel," "The Mushroom" and "The Umbrella". In 2009, it was declared a Cultural Heritage Site for its place in Norwegian sanitary history.

== Construction ==
The urinal was designed by municipal architect Harald Aars (1875–1945), and was finished in 1937. There were three main considerations behind the building's design: it was supposed to give shelter for the rain, its open form should ensure ventilation and prevent bad odors, and users should be shielded from public view. In addition to this, it should also fit aesthetically into the environment of the surrounding park. The round shape of the building is typical of functionalist architecture.

== Meeting place of homosexuals ==
Homosexuality has traditionally been a taboo subject in Norway, and sex between men was illegal until 1972. For this reason, homosexual men had to find ways to convene, either privately, or secretly at specific public places. Several public urinals became meeting places for gay men, and these places were given humorous nicknames, such as "Bel Amis" at Sagene, and "The Wailing Wall" by the municipal library. Of all these places, Kjærlighetskarusellen in Stensparken is the only one still extant today.

== Cultural Heritage Site ==
The year 2009 was declared Norwegian Year of Cultural Heritage, aimed at highlighting the diversity and importance of Norway's cultural heritage for all sectors of the community. In connection with this, Kjærlighetskarusellen was declared a Norwegian Cultural Heritage Site. The Norwegian Directorate for Cultural Heritage started the process towards protecting the building in mid-October 2008. Leif Pareli, curator at the Norwegian Museum of Cultural History, commended the decision, and commented both on the "simple and good functional shape" of the building, and on its status as "a well-known meeting place for gays and...therefore a trace of old gay history."

On 30 April 2009, a special ceremony was held for the declaration of the urinal as a protected building. Present at the ceremony were city conservation officer Marte Boro, Minister of the Environment Erik Solheim and Mayor of Oslo Fabian Stang. Nils Marstein, Norwegian Director for Cultural Heritage, said in a speech that "the purpose of the protection of the urinal in Stensparken is to preserve an important example in sanitary history of how the city arranged for trivial needs."
