= Adolph Tidemand =

Norwegian painter

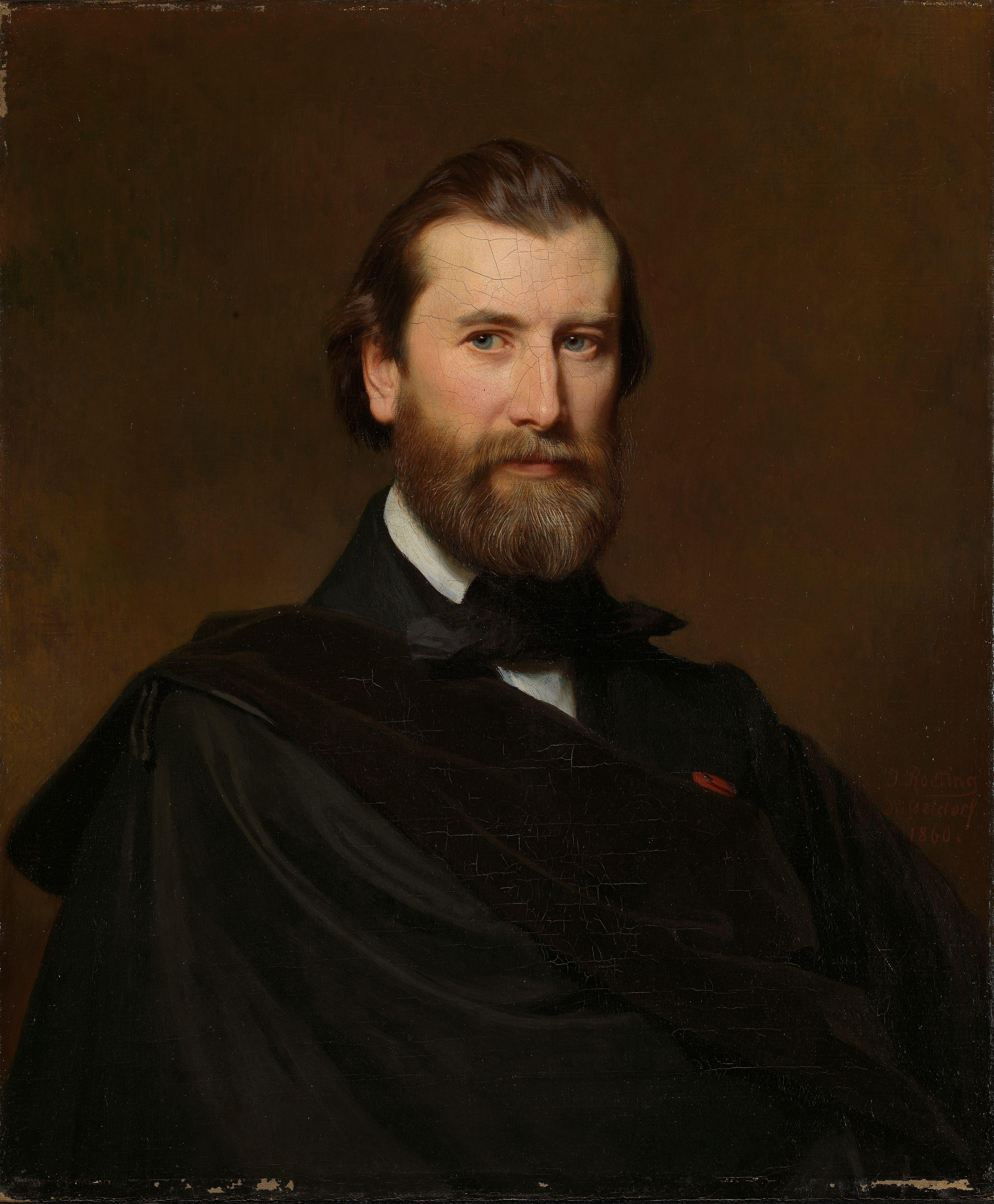
- Portrait by Julius Roeting, 1860
- Born: 14 August 1814; Mandal, Vest-Agder, Norway
- Died: 8 August 1876 (aged 61); Christiania, United Kingdoms of Sweden and Norway
- Education: Kunstakademie Düsseldorf
- Known for: Painting
- Notable work: Bridal Procession on the Hardangerfjord
- Movement: Norwegian romantic nationalism

Adolph Tidemand (14 August 1814 – 8 August 1876) was a Norwegian romantic nationalism painter. Among his best known paintings are Haugianerne (The Haugeans; 1852) and Brudeferd i Hardanger (The Bridal Procession in Hardanger; 1848), painted in collaboration with Hans Gude.

== Biography ==
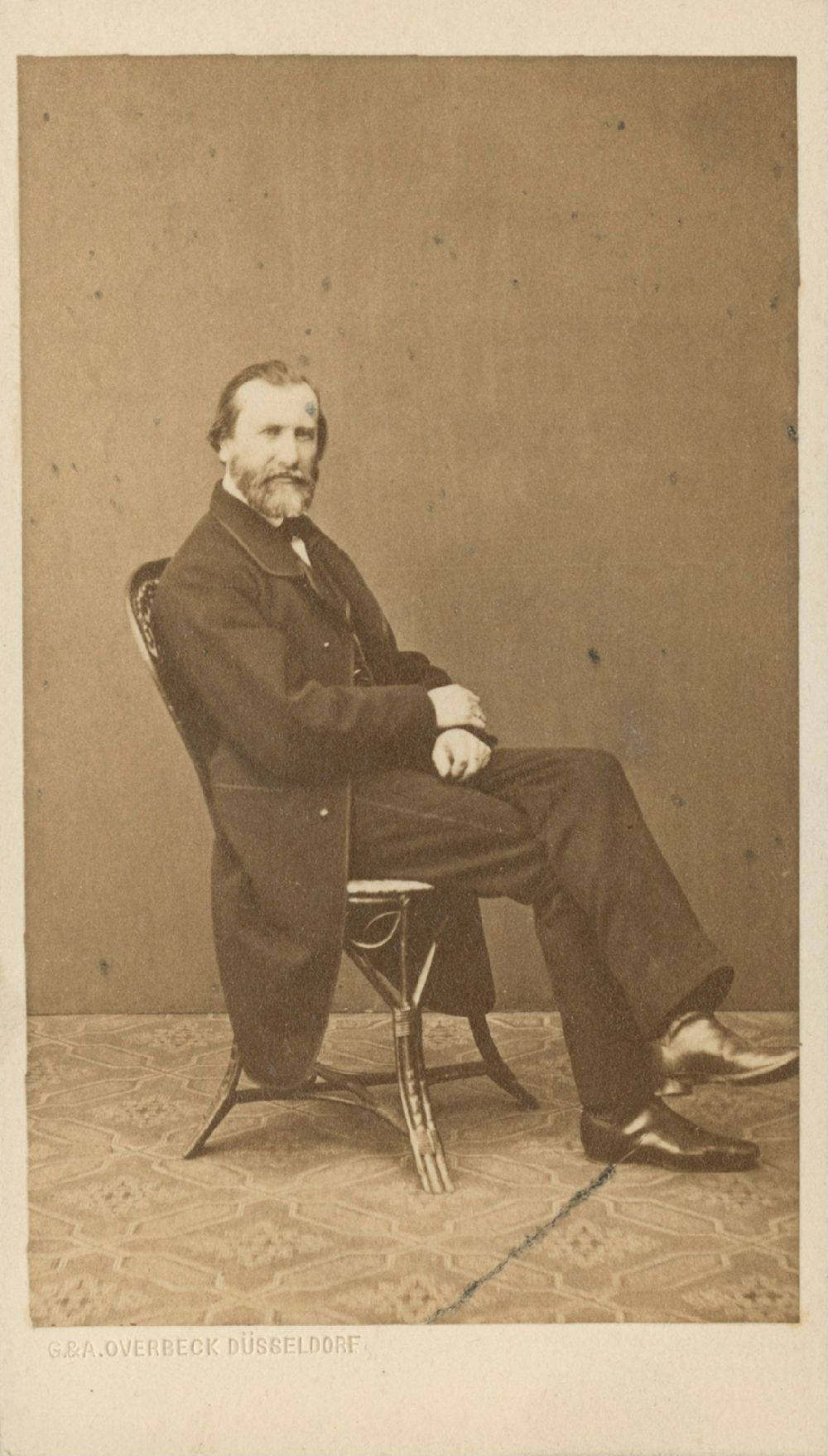
Adolph Tidemand by G. & A. Overbeck (firm), c. 1868

Adolph Tidemand was born in Mandal, Norway as the son of customs inspector and Storting representative Christen Tidemand (1779–1838) and Johanne Henriette Henrikke Haste (1779–1859). He received private art lessons in his home town and his talent was soon recognized. He then was enrolled in an art school in Christiania, moving on to Copenhagen in the period 1832–1837. Upon arrival in Copenhagen, he was rejected by the Royal Danish Academy of Fine Arts and studied at a private school of art, but by 1833 he was a pupil at the academy, earning Academy exhibitions in 1835 and 1836. He studied there for five years and then began a journey to Italy to study further. But when Tidemand came to Düsseldorf, Germany, he liked it so much that he settled down there.

From 1837 until 1841 he continued his studies at the art academy in Düsseldorf, which at the time enjoyed widespread international recognition. He studied with and was influenced by his teacher, Theodor Hildebrandt. Here he prepared the well known Hjemvendte fiskere ved den sjællandske kyst (1838). The painting Gustav Vasa taler til dalalmuen i Mora kirke (1841) was sold to a German museum, but was later returned to Christiania. He is associated with the Düsseldorf school of painting.

In the autumn of 1841 he studied in Italy along with his brother Emil. Few of his works from this period remain, except for the picture Napolitansk fisker (1842). Tidemand was preoccupied by Norwegian history, particularly after returning on a journey to Norway. During a journey to 1843 in Hardanger, he met the 18-year-old Hans Gude. This resulted in a close friendship, and eventually they collaborated on several landscape paintings in which Tidemand painted the figures.

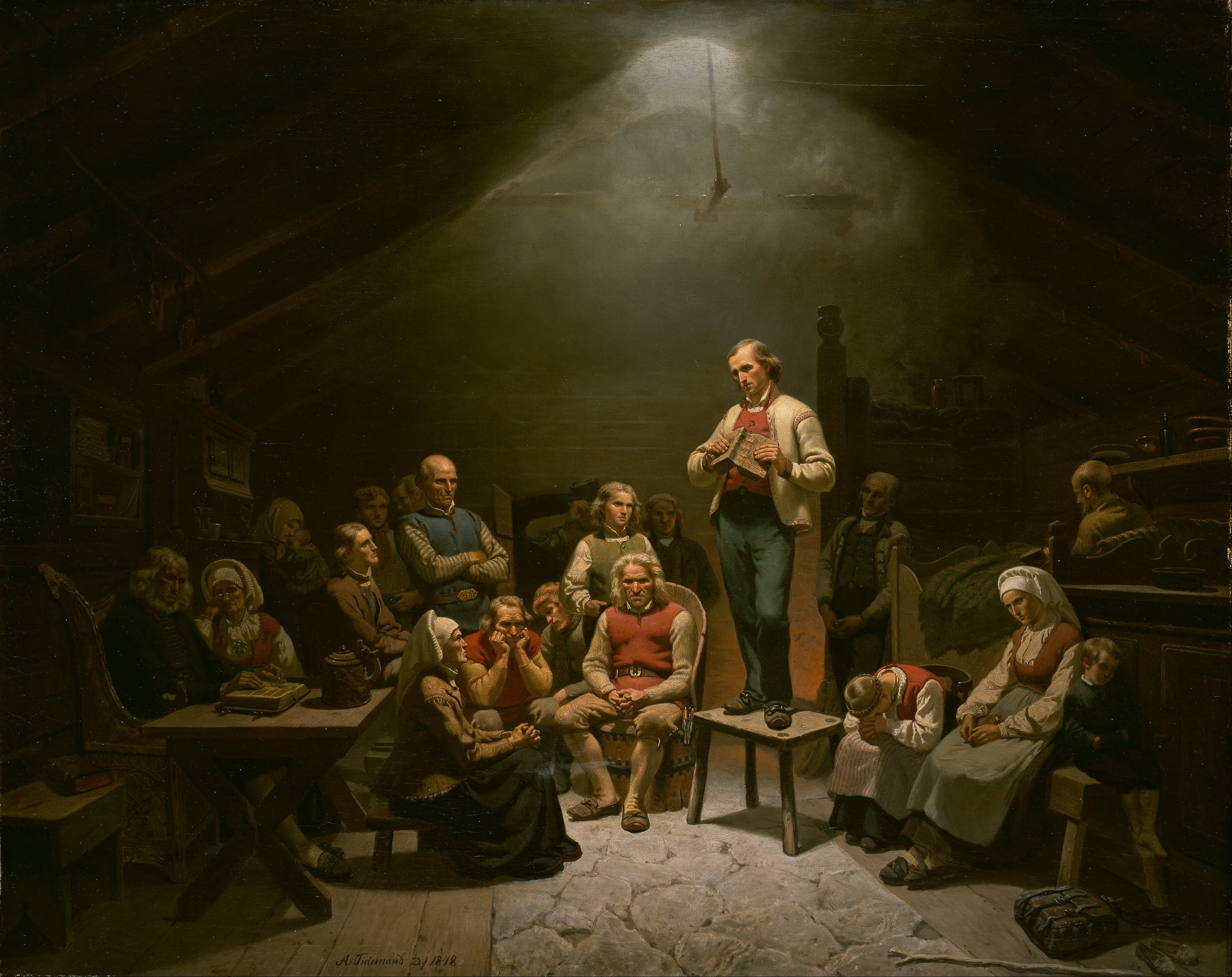
Haugianerne Low Church Devotion (The Haugeans. 1852)

During 1842–1845 he traveled extensively in Norway (to Østerdalen, Gudbrandsdalen, Sogn, Hardanger and Telemark). More of his works survive from this period, including Eventyrfortellersken (1844), Søndagskveld i en hardangersk røkstue (1843) and Gudstjeneste i en norsk landsens kirke (1845). In his later travels in southern Norway, the last in 1875, Tidemand studied folk costumes, domestic utensils and building and made himself familiar with oral traditions, folk tales and legends. His version of rusticity proved highly popular and in 1848 he was commissioned by Oscar I, King of Sweden and Norway, to paint a series of Norwegian peasant life for the royal palace of Oscarshall, near Christiania.

Today Adolph Tidemand is best known for this depiction of Norwegian farm and culture and is counted among the first Norwegian historic painters. In Tidemand's paintings of the old Norwegian farm culture, he portrayed the peasant with a new dignity, humane and culturally. The National Museum of Art, Architecture and Design (Nasjonalgalleriet) in Oslo alone owns more than 100 of his works.

== Personal life ==
He married in 1845 with his childhood sweetheart, Claudine Marie Bergitte Jæger (1817–1887). The couple settled in Düsseldorf in 1845. Their only child, a son, Adolph, died in 1874 at 28 years of age.

Tidemand was awarded the Royal Norwegian Order of St. Olav (Den Kongelige Norske St. Olavs Orden) in 1849, the French Legion of Honor (Légion d'honneur) in 1855 and the Swedish Order of the Polar Star (Nordstjärneorden) in 1866.

== Better known works ==
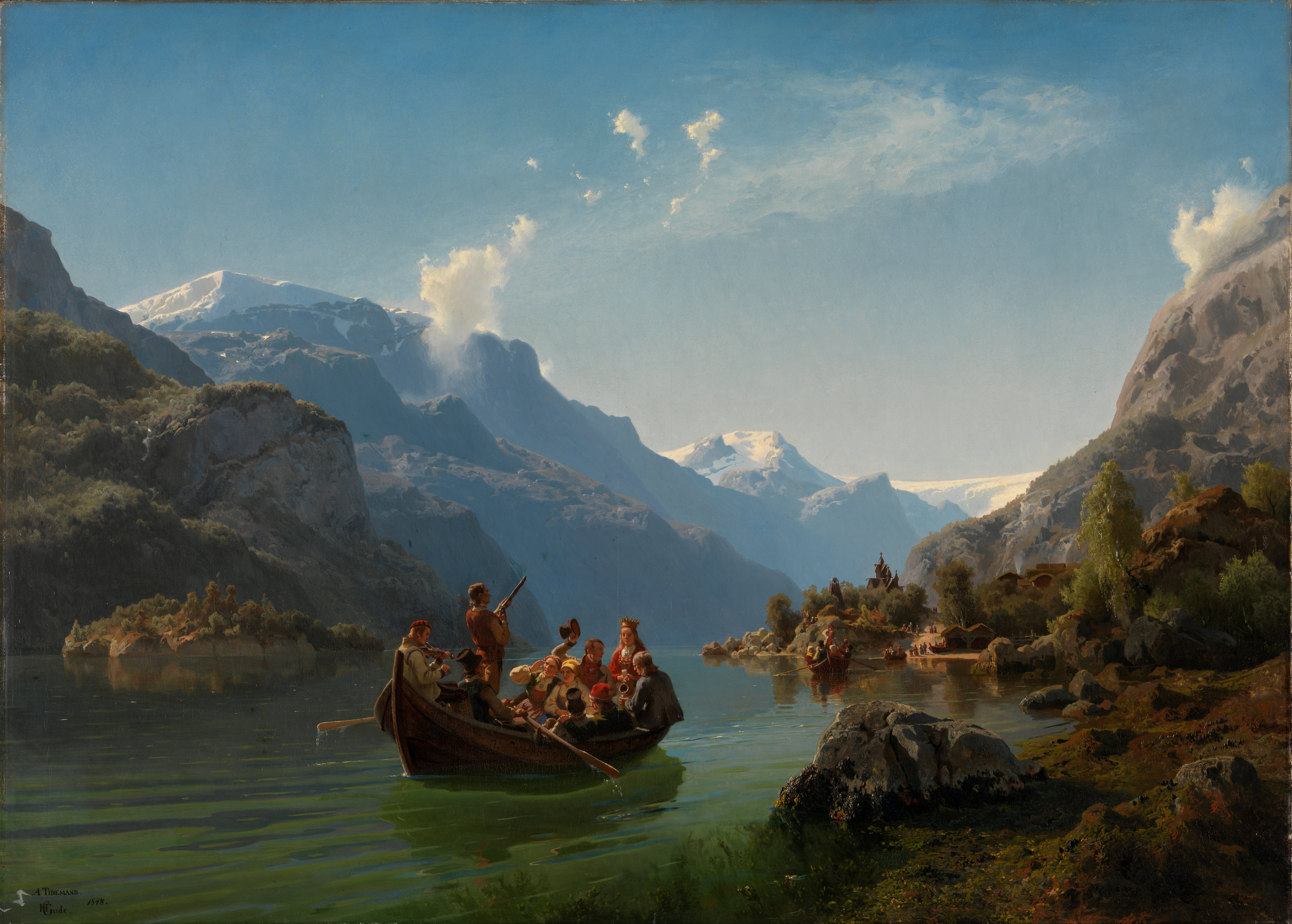
Brudeferden i Hardanger (Bridal party, with Hans Gude. 1848)

- 1838 – Hjemvendte fiskere ved den sjællandske kyst
- 1841 – Gustav Vasa taler til dalkarlene i Mora kirke
- 1843 – Søndagskveld i en hardangersk røkstue
- 1844 – Eventyrfortellersken
- 1845 – Søndagskveld i en røykstue i Hardanger
- 1846 – Norsk juleskikk
- 1848 – Brudeferden i Hardanger (painted together with Hans Gude)
- 1848 – Signe Halvorsdatter Valle i Sætersdalen
- 1848 – Haugianerne (painted again in 1852)
- 1849 – De ensomme gamle (Also known as Husandakt)
- 1849 – Ingeborg Andersdatter Gulsvik, Flå, som brud
- 1851 – Aften på Krøderen (painted together with Hans Gude)
- 1852 – series Bondeliv i Oscarshall
- 1852 – Haugianerne
- 1853 – Likferd på Sognefjorden (painted together with Hans Gude)
- 1854 – Den foreldreløse
- 1859 – Fiskere i havsnød (painted together with Hans Gude)
- 1865 – Bestemors brudekrone
- 1865 – Fanatikerne
- 1874 – Syneve
- 1874 – Nød

== Gallery ==
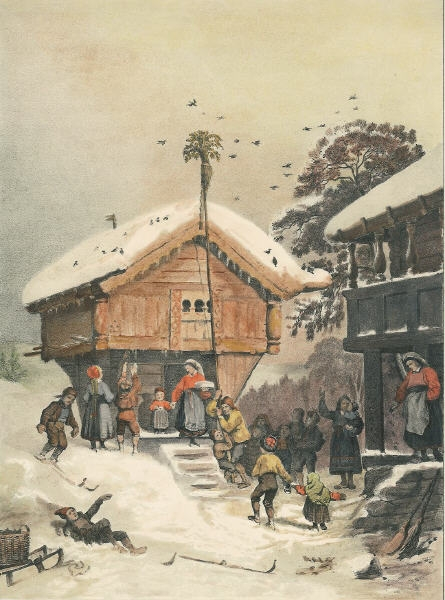
Norsk juleskik (Norwegian Christmas customs. 1846)

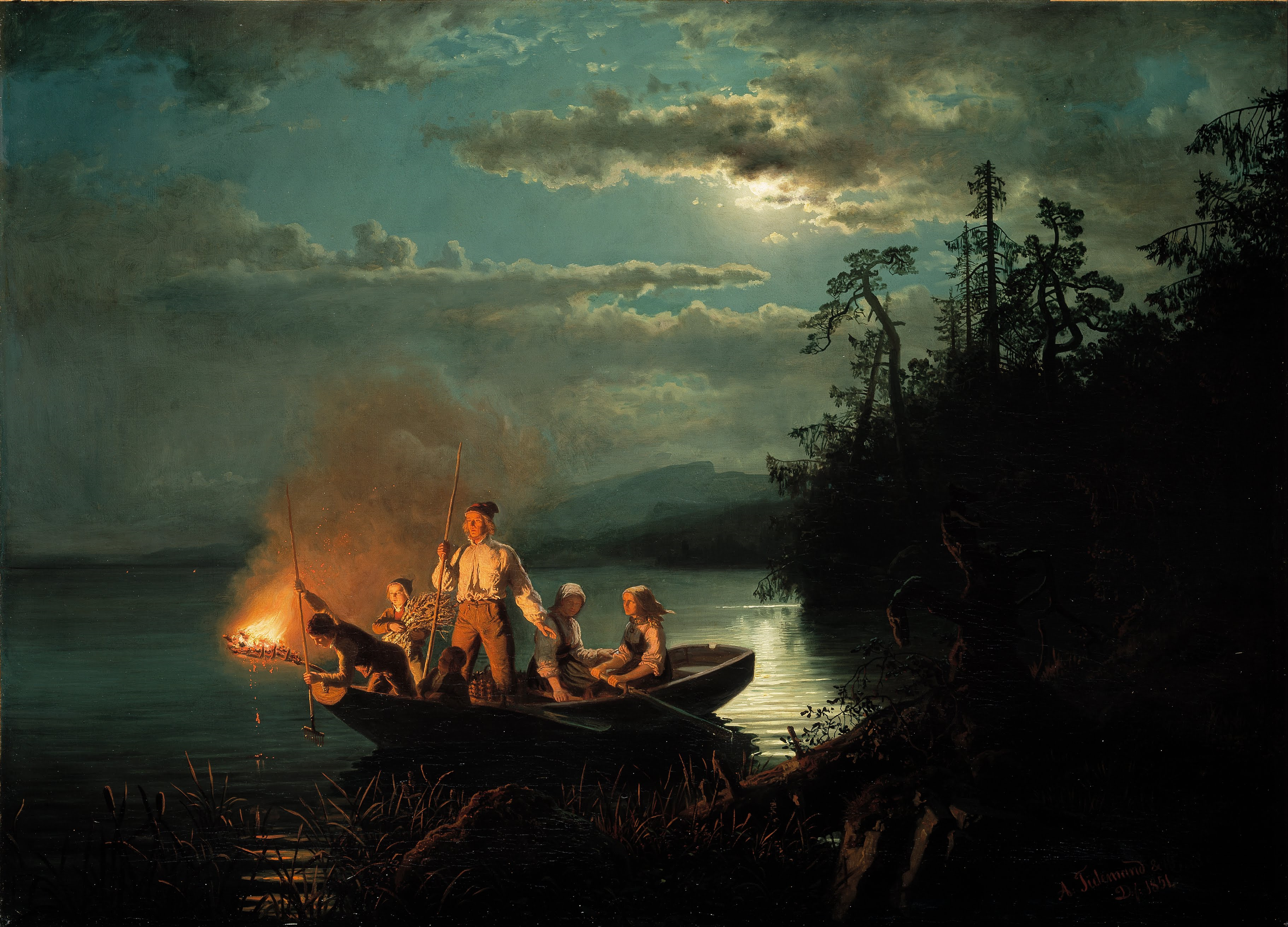
Lystringen, Hans Gude and Adolph Tidemand (Fishing with a harpoon. 1851)

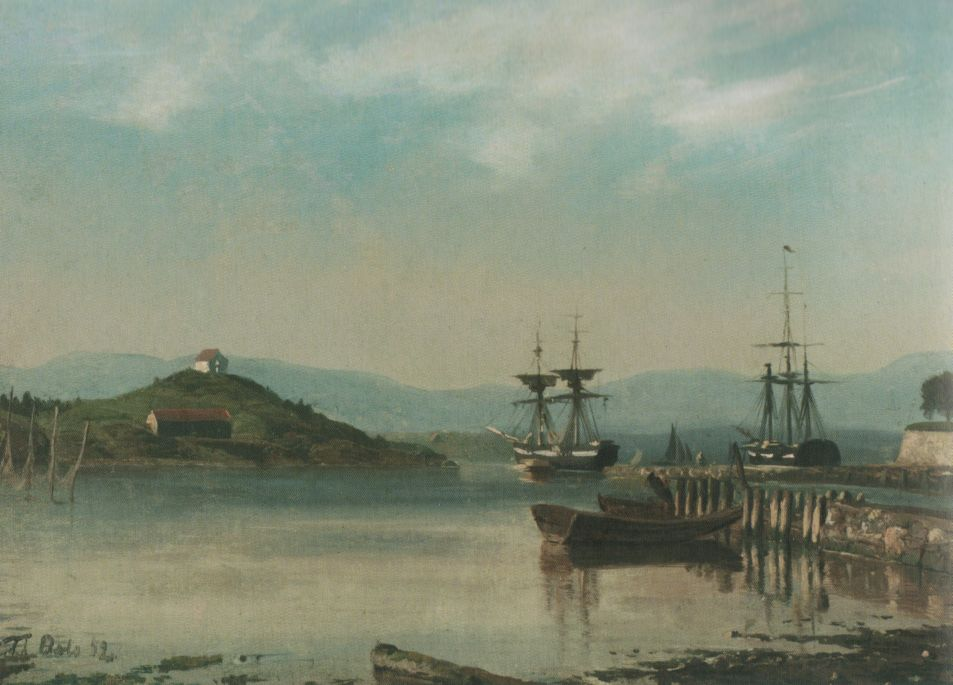
Parti fra Oslo Strandgate (View from Oslo Beach Street. 1852)

Likferd Pa Sognefjorden (Burial at Sognefjord, with Hans Gude. 1853)

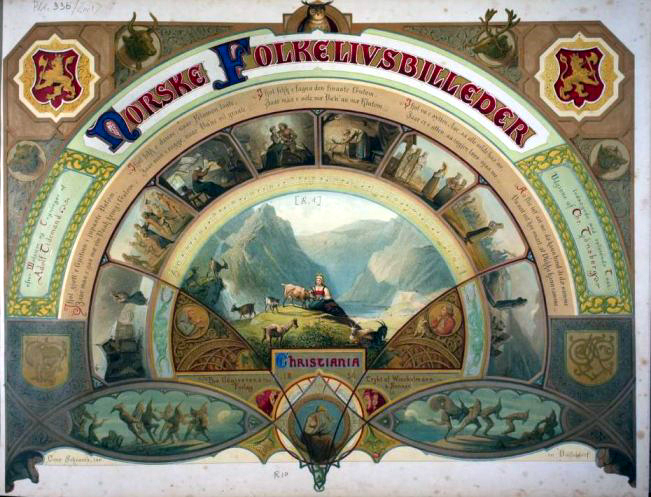
Norske Folkelivsbilleder (Norwegian folk pictures. 1854)

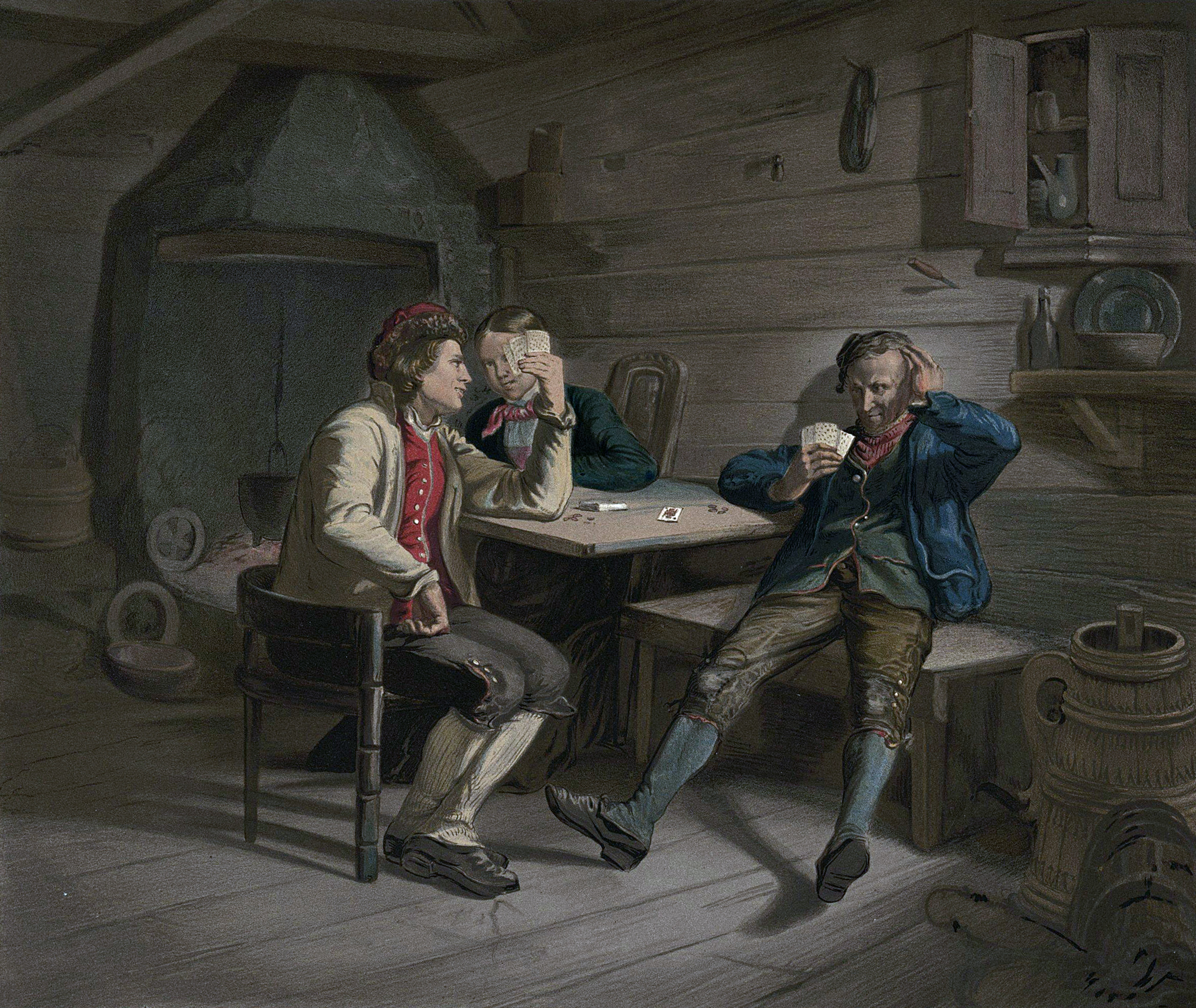
The player at cards, before 1858

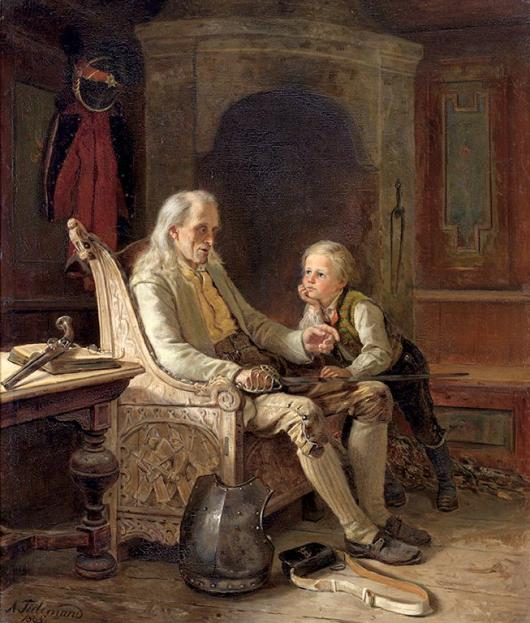
Bestefaderens Erindringer (Grandfather's Memories. 1865)

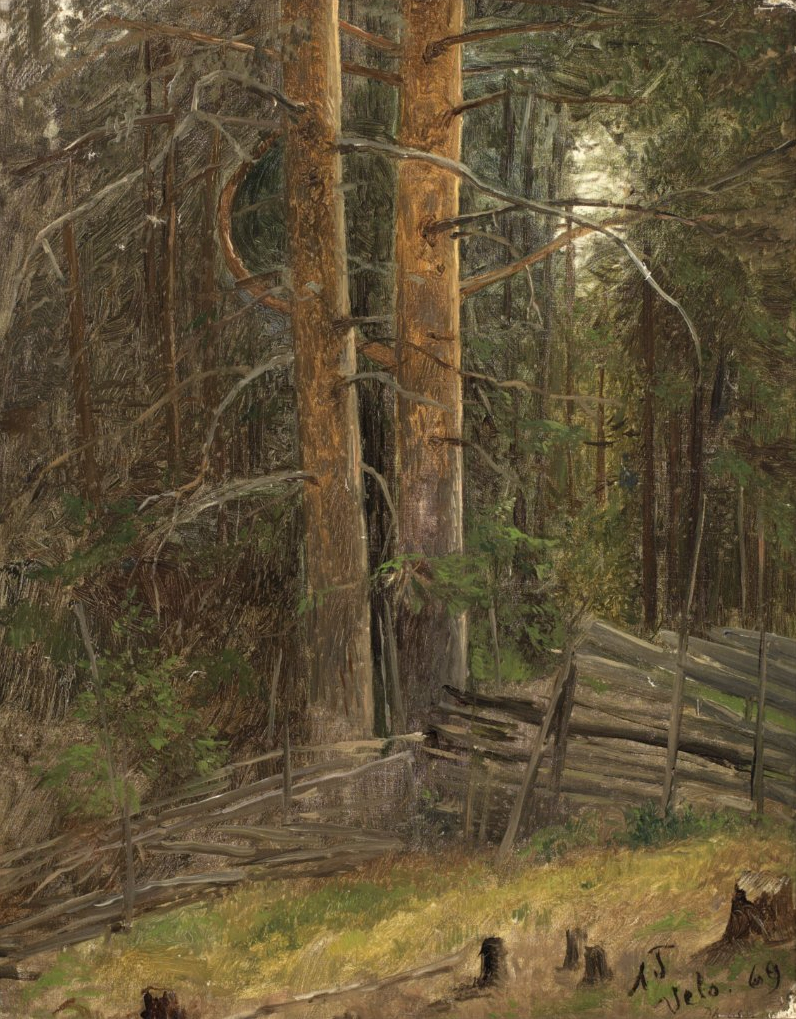
Skovinteriör (Forest interior. 1869)

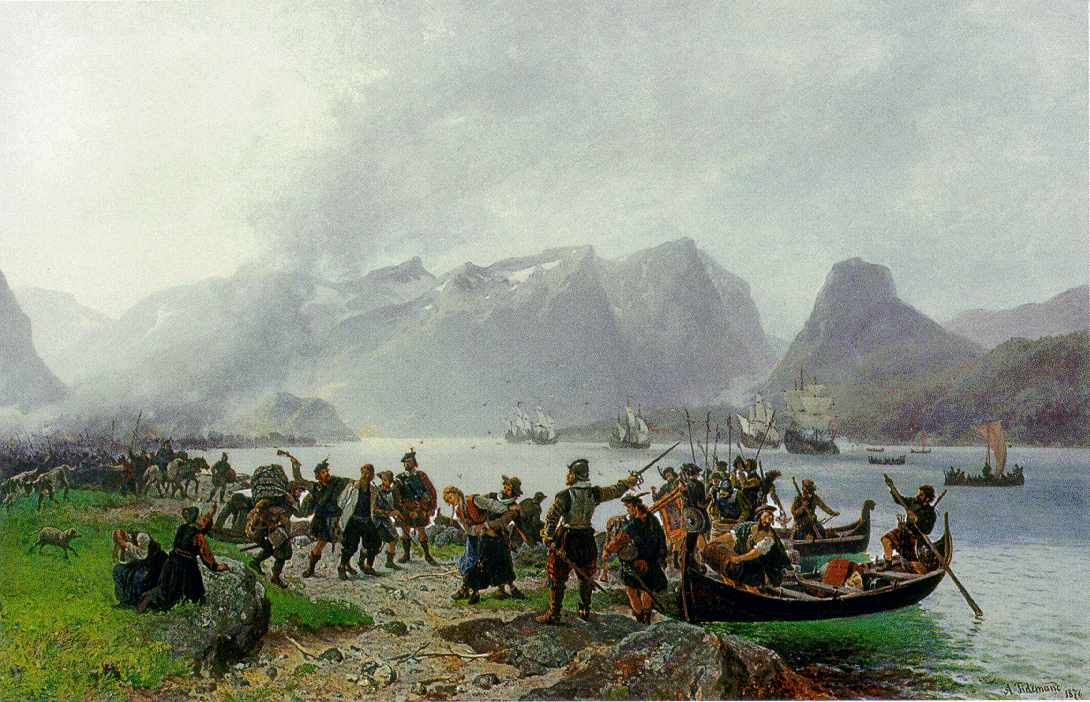
Sinclair's landing in Romsdal (1876)

== Sources ==
- Askeland, Jan. Adolph Tidemand og hans tid (Oslo: Aschehoug. 1991). ISBN 978-82-03-16670-9
- Askeland, Jan. Norsk Malerkunst, Hovedlinjen gjennom 200år – uten stedsangivelse (Oslo: Aschehoug. 1981). ISBN 82-02-04898-2.
- Dietrichson, Lorentz. Adolph Tidemand, Hans Liv Og Hans Værker, Volumes 1-2 (Nabu Press. 1923). ISBN 978-1-145-67978-8
- Noss, Aagot. Adolph Tidemand og folk han møtte, studiar frå reisene i norske dalføre, akvarellar, målarstykke og teikningar (Universitetsforlaget. 1981). ISBN 82-00-05712-7
- Haverkamp, Frode. Adolph Tidemand 1814-1876, Hans Fredrik Gude 1825-1903 (Blaafarveværket, 1984). ISBN 82-990568-6-1
