= Mountain ranges of Norway =

Coordinates: 61°36′18″N 8°28′39″E

The geography of Norway is dominated by vast mountain ranges broken up by valleys and fjords. Less than 3% of the country's area is arable, and the rest is mountainous. Glaciers are the major cause for erosion, so the terrain in the Norwegian mountains consists of plateaus and lakes with peaks. These areas have an abundant and diverse fauna and flora.

The altitude of the treeline comes slowly down going to higher latitudes; in northern Finnmark, the treeline reaches sea level. The treeline is also lower near the coast, and higher on the eastern slopes of the mountains.

Mountain ranges also form the main boundaries among Norway's districts. They typically run north-south. Several of the ranges have had road and railroad passes since historical times; some are newer; and many close over the winter.

Norwegian mountain ranges provide some of the most attractive recreational areas, both during summer and winter. Cabins and trails are operated by the Norwegian Mountain Touring Association at intervals that allow for weeks of uninterrupted hiking or cross-country skiing in the mountains.

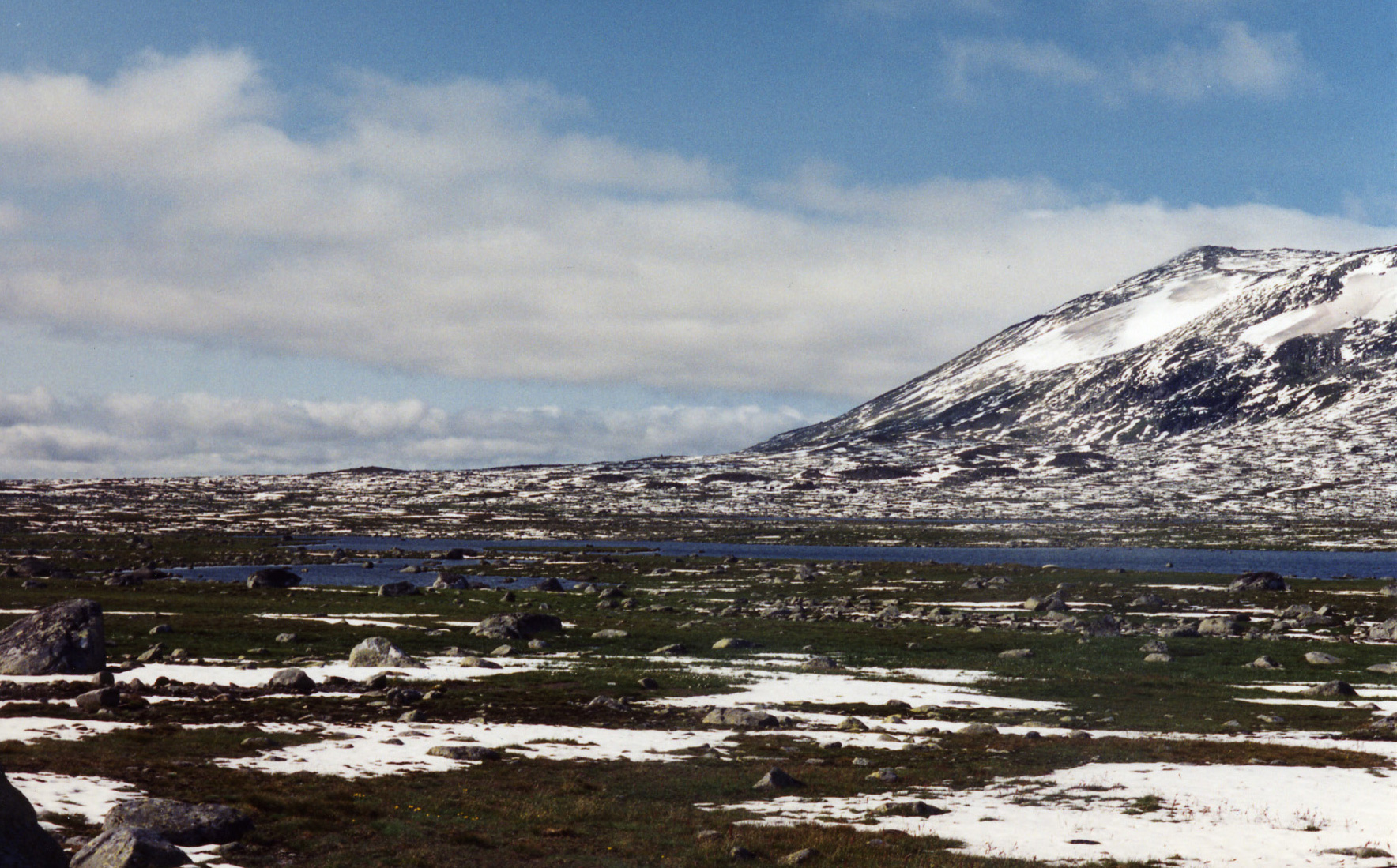
Early summer in mountain range between Valdres and Hallingdal.

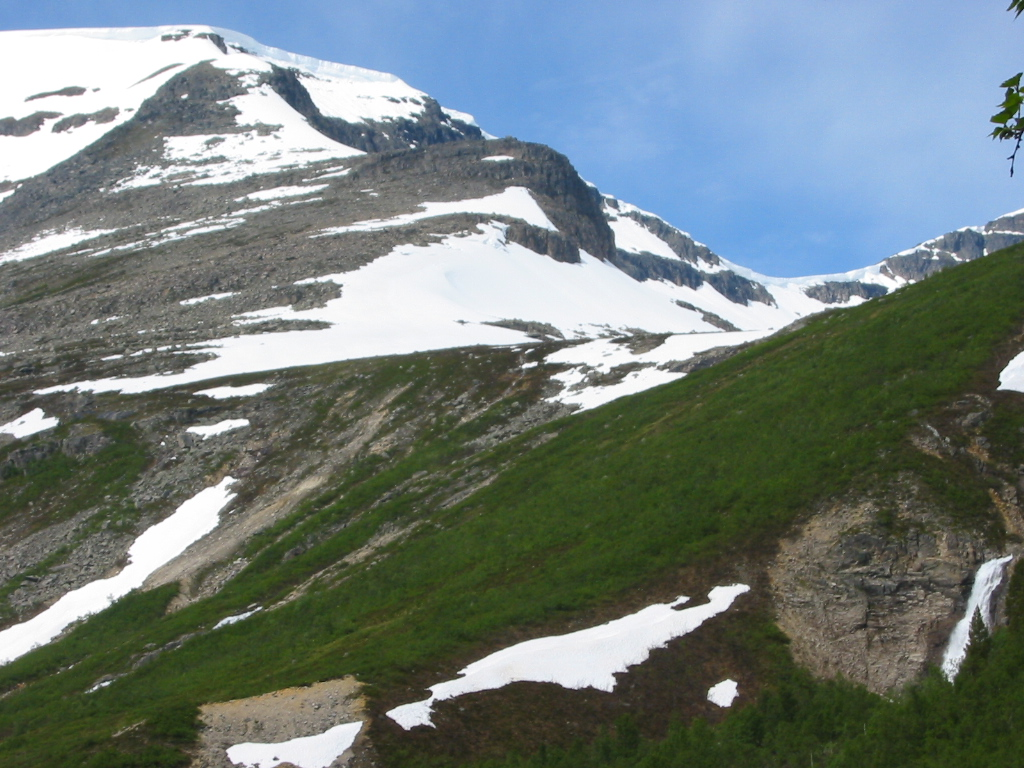
Trollheimen mountain range July 3, 2005. The mountain is Trollhetta.

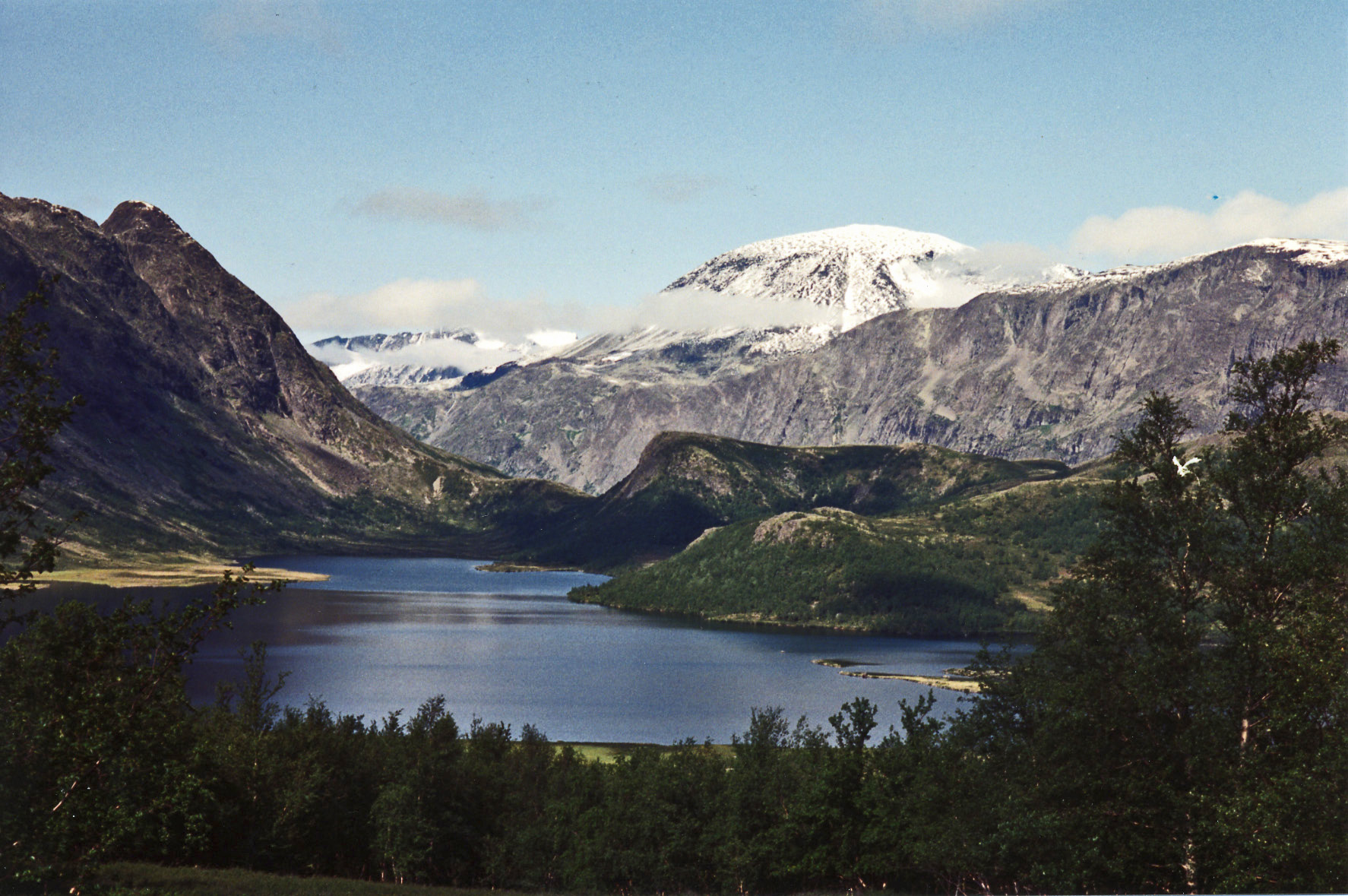
Scene from the Valdresflya landscape in Vågå Municipality towards Leirungen. Besshøe (2258m) in the background.

== See also ==
- Scandinavian Mountains
- Caledonian orogeny
- Geology of Norway

== Guidebooks ==
Guidebooks in languages other than Norwegian are few. The following is a list of current mountaineering and walking guidebooks in print in English.

- A. Dyer et al. "Walks and Scrambles in Norway", ISBN 1-904466-25-7.
- Ed Webster "Climbing in the Magic Islands", ISBN 82-993199-0-0.
- Tony Howard "Climbs, Scrambles and Walks in Romsdal: Norway", ISBN 1-904207-24-3.
- Jon Haukassveen and Tom Atle Bordevik "Heavy Water - Rjukken Ice", ISBN 1-873341-46-6.
- Peter Lennon "Scandinavian Mountains", ISBN 0-906227-32-1.
- Constance Roos "Walking in Norway", ISBN 1-85284-230-X.
- James Baxter "Scandinavian Mountains and Peaks Over 2000 Metres in the Hurrungane", ISBN 0-9550497-0-9.
- Bernhard Pollmann "Norway South", ISBN 3-7633-4807-7.
