= Norwegian Year of Cultural Heritage 2009 =

Event in Norway

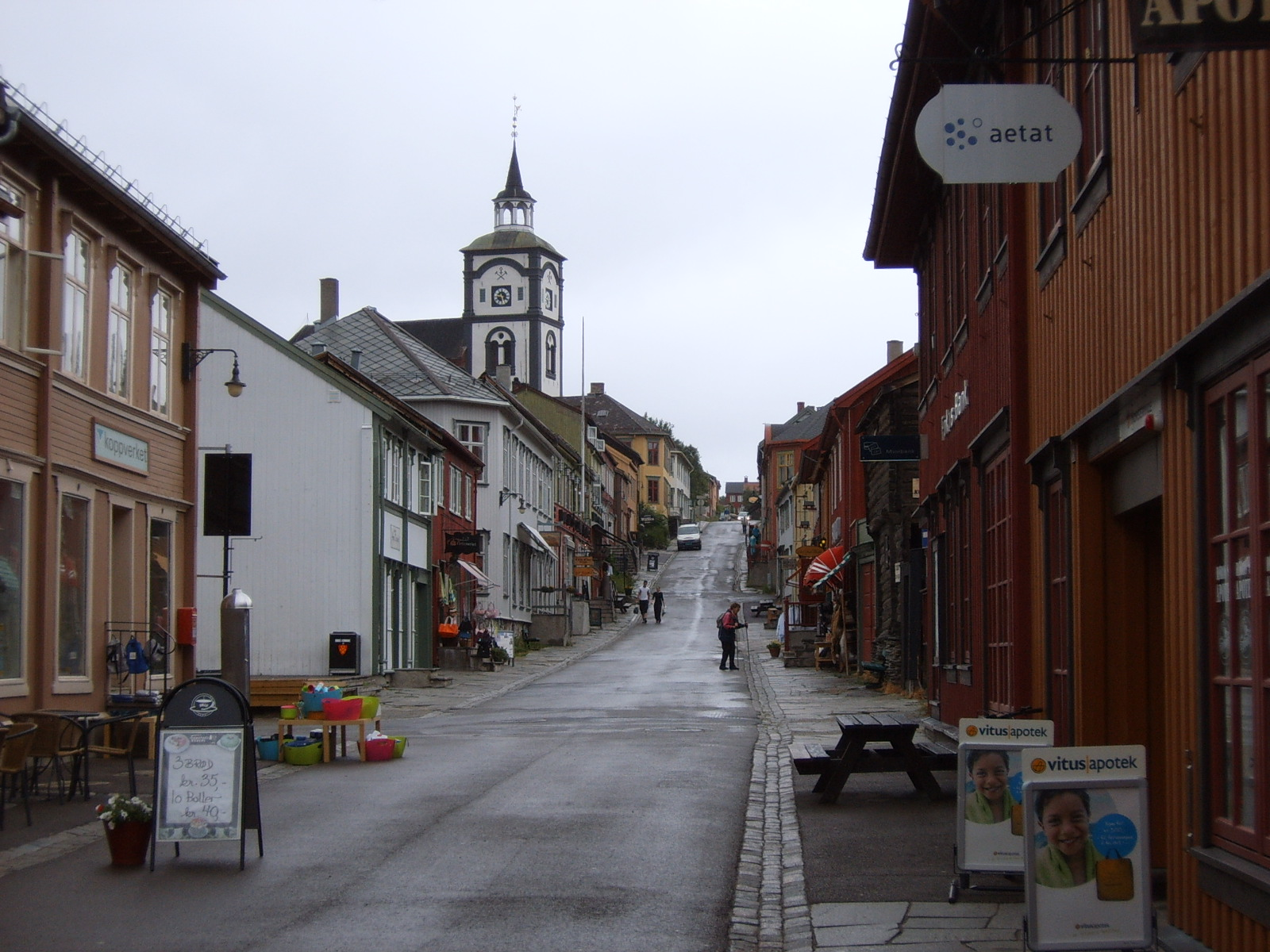
Centre of Røros, Norway

The Norwegian Year of Cultural Heritage 2009 or (in Norwegian) Kulturminneåret 2009 was aimed at highlighting the diversity and importance of Norway's cultural heritage for all sectors of the community. Under the theme of Cultural Heritage in Everyday Life, the arrangements were intended to involve both ordinary citizens and professionals at local, regional and national levels.

== Two approaches ==
With a view to broadening the appreciation of cultural memory, two complementary approaches were developed. One focused on the development of cultural heritage in Norway, building on existing cultural trends and processes, in order to provide a better understanding of how key aspects of today's heritage have evolved over the years. The second priority was to enhance cultural heritage documentation by providing a basis for both small local projects and large institutional assignments.

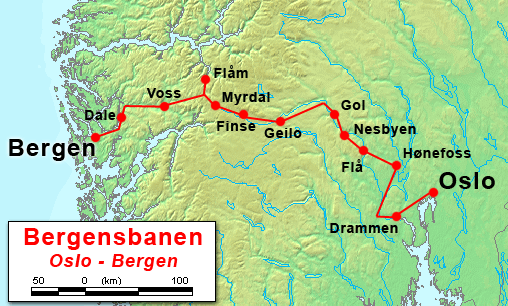
Bergensbanen Railway

== Activities ==
The many activities in support of the Year included exhibitions, cultural tours, school projects and, especially at the local level, incentives for the creation of a wide variety of Wikipedia articles on local history and culture.

One of the special projects was centred on Bergensbanen, the Oslo to Bergen railway, which celebrated its centenary in 2009. Memory institutions were working with railway enthusiasts and the Norwegian Railway Museum to provide opportunities for towns and villages along the line to investigate how the railway affected their communities.

In collaboration with kulturnett.no an important aspect of tangible or intangible cultural memory was highlighted for special attention each week.

== Coordination ==
The Norwegian Cultural Heritage Association, an umbrella organisation promoting the role of cultural heritage, was the central coordinator for implementing the Year of Cultural Heritage. The Association ensured close collaboration with the ministries responsible for the environment and for cultural affairs as well as with the Norwegian Association of Local and Regional Authorities, the Directorate for Cultural Heritage, the Archive, Library and Museum Authority and the Museum Association.
