= Bridal Procession on the Hardangerfjord =

Norwegian painting by Hans Gude and Adolph Tidemand

- Brudeferd i Hardanger (Norwegian)
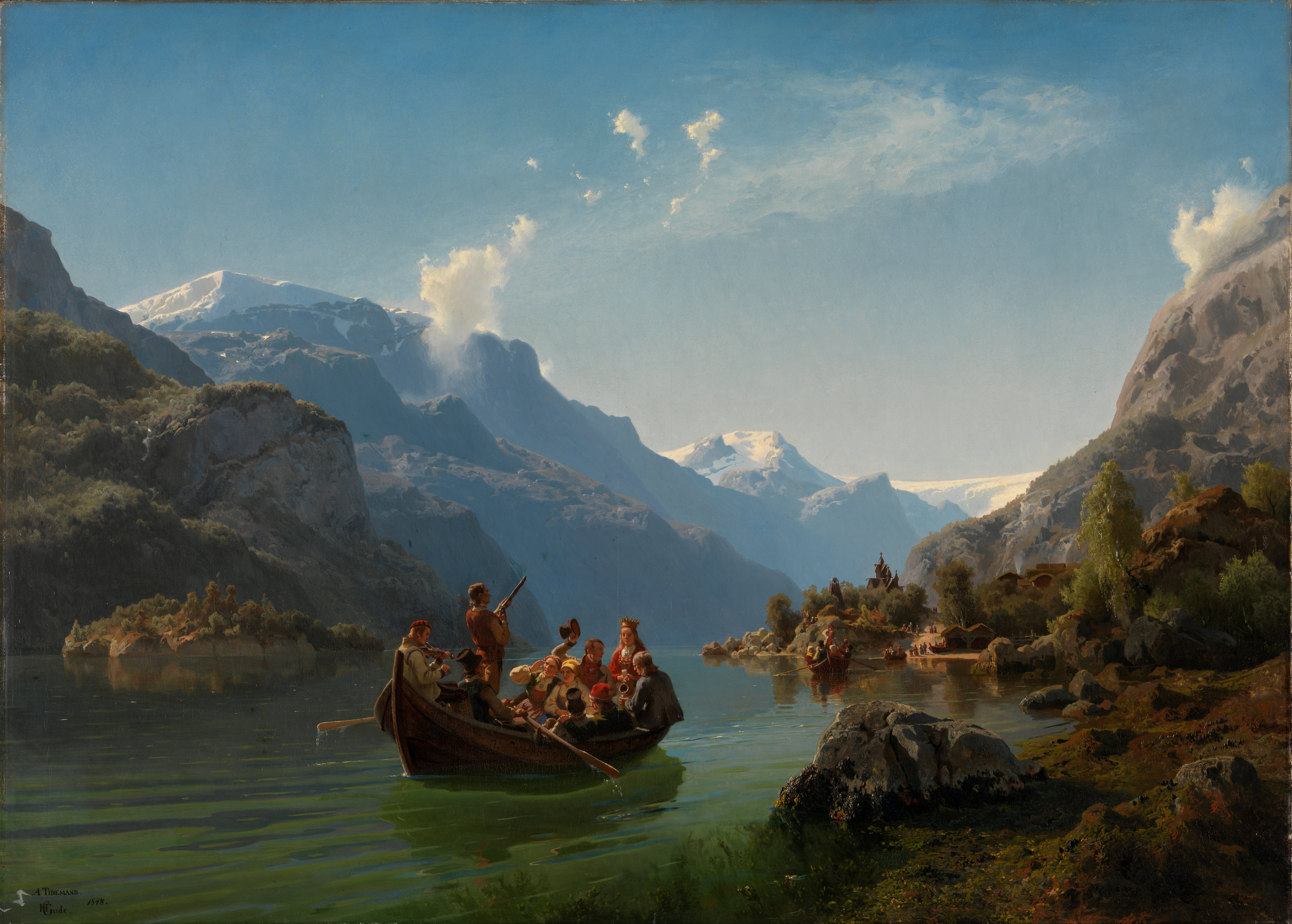
- Artist: Hans Gude and Adolph Tidemand
- Year: 1848
- Catalogue: NG.M.00467
- Medium: Oil on canvas
- Dimensions: 93 cm × 130 cm (37 in × 51 in)
- Location: National Gallery, Oslo
- Website: www.nasjonalmuseet.no/en/collection/object/NG.M.00467

Bridal Procession on the Hardanger (Norwegian: Brudeferd i Hardanger) is an 1848 oil painting by Hans Gude and Adolph Tidemand. Gude, aged just 23, painted the landscapes and Tidemand, a decade his senior, the bridal party. Each of the Norwegian artists had studied at the Kunstakademie Düsseldorf before they first met in Hardanger in 1843, and the painting was made in the winter of 1847–1848 in Düsseldorf. It measures 93 cm × 130 cm (37 in × 51 in) and has been held by the National Gallery in Oslo since 1895. It is one of the best known Norwegian paintings, and is considered to be an excellent example of romantic nationalism in Norway, combining a romanticised landscape with traditions of Norwegian life.

The painting depicts a bridal procession, crossing a fjord in rowing boats after the wedding. The first boat carries the groom, tipping his hat, and the bride, in her bridal crown and traditional red costume of the Hardanger region. They are accompanied by some wedding guests: one person is pouring a drink from a jug, a musician is playing a fiddle, and a man is standing to fire a gun in celebration. The boat crew are dressed in typical Bunad costumes. In the distance are two other boats conveying wedding guests, while more people wait on the shoreline, and others wave from a promontory. In the background is a stave church, under a blue summer sky with bright sunlight catching small clouds and snow on the mountains and a glacier. While the scenery resembles Hardangerfjord and the Folgefonna glacier, Gude later wrote that it was not a view of a particular location, but rather was a composite made from his observations.

The painting was commissioned as the backdrop for a tableau vivant. The soirée at the Christiania Theatre in March 1849 included a theatrical group dressed in traditional costumes aboard a boat who performed a song "Brudefærden" ("The Wedding Procession") by Andreas Munch with music by Halfdan Kjerulf, with the painting itself serving as scenery.

Gude and Tidemand collaborated on other paintings, including at least five versions of the Hardanger bridal procession made around 1850, each with differences. The prime version of 1848 was bought by the National Gallery in Oslo in 1895. A second version of 1848 includes Ole Bull as the violinist: he had performed at the Christiania Theatre. Three versions were painted in 1853, of which one was sold at Grev Wedels Plass Auksjoner in 2002 for NOK 5.1 million.

Parallels have been drawn between these paintings by Gude and Tidemand, and the first version of Washington Crossing the Delaware made by fellow Düsseldorf artist Emanuel Leutze from 1848 to 1850. The first version of Leutze's painting was destroyed in Germany during the Second World War, but two later versions survived in the US.

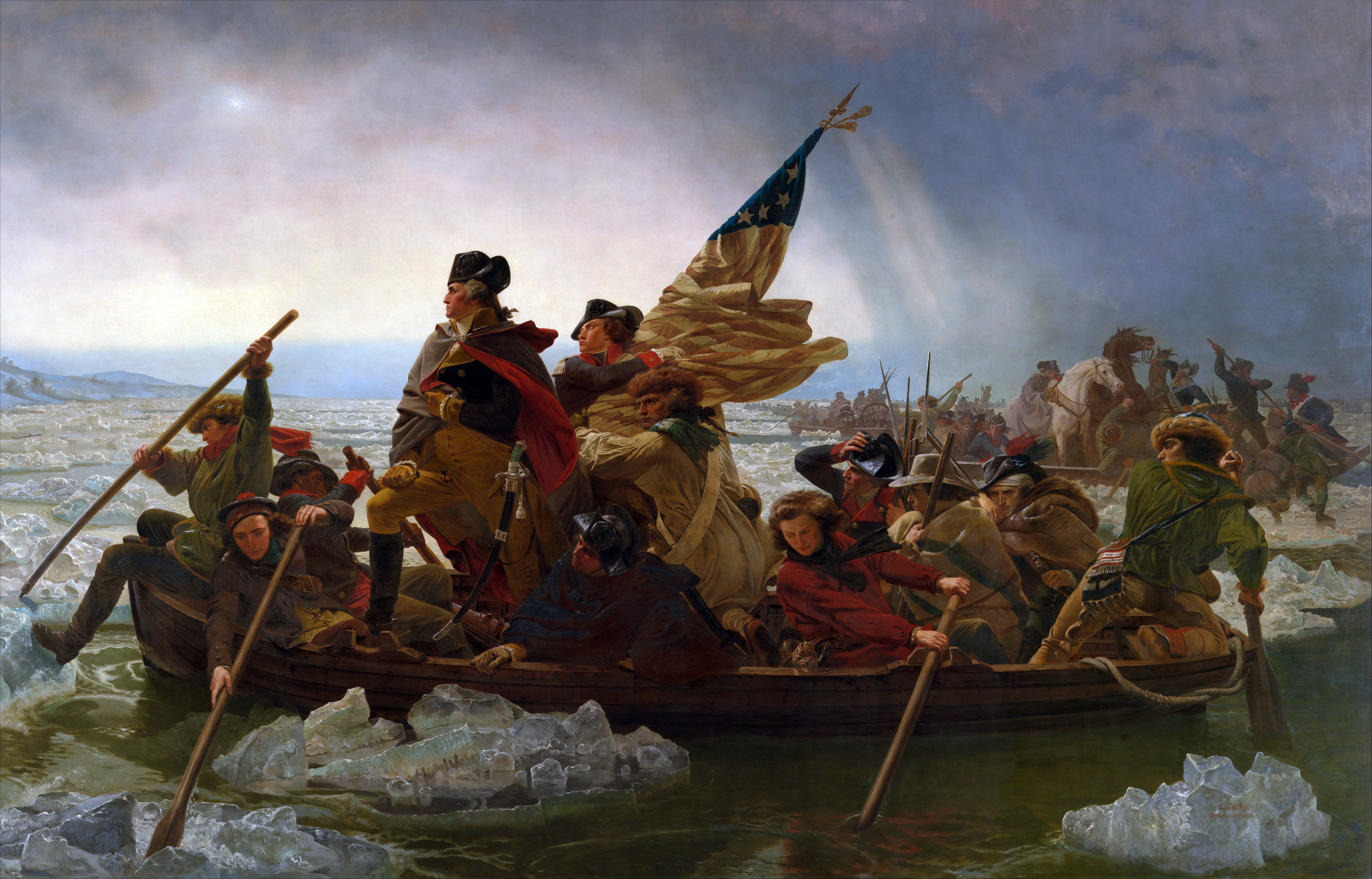
Emanuel Leutze's Washington Crossing the Delaware, 1851, Metropolitan Museum of Art

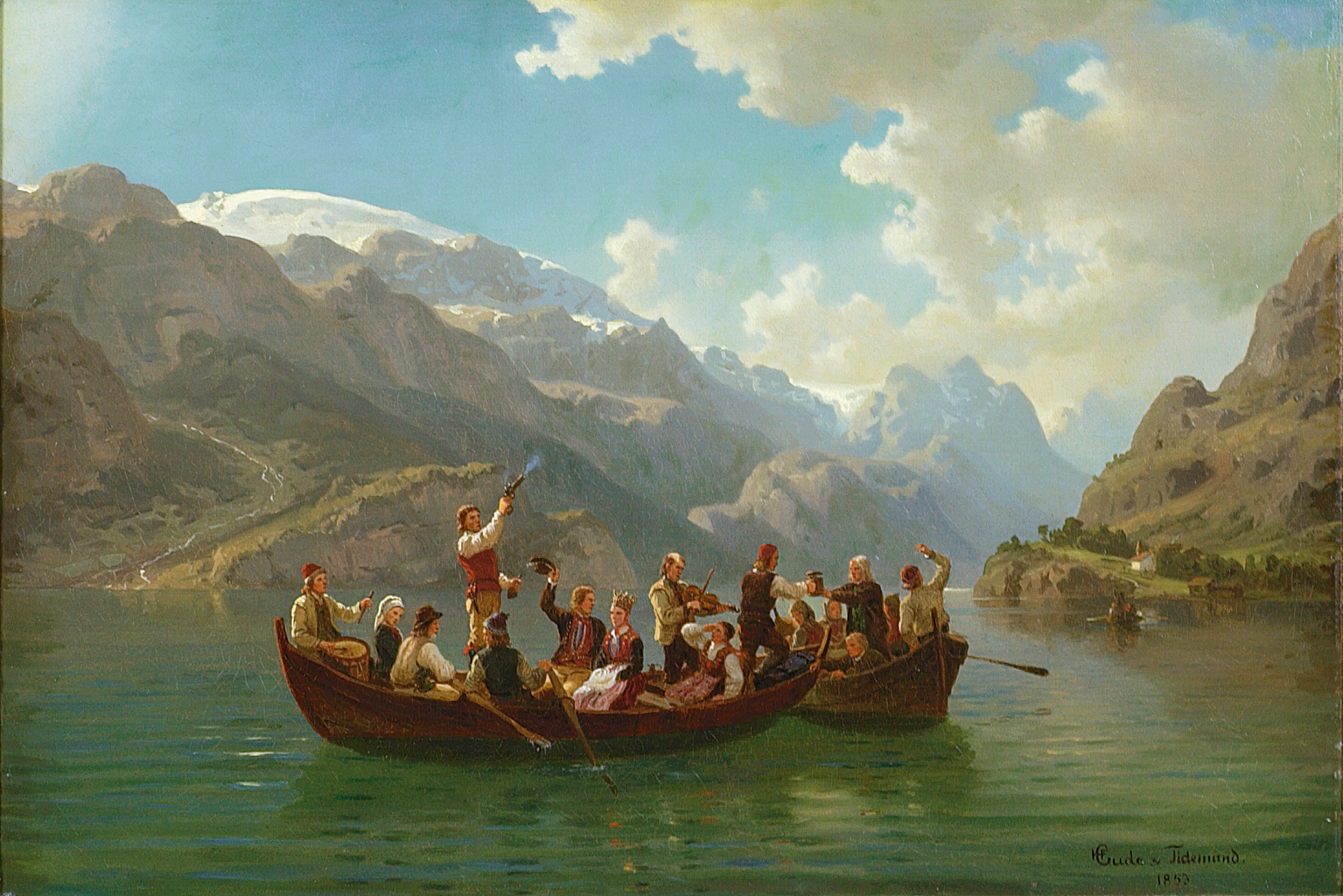
1853 version, private collection

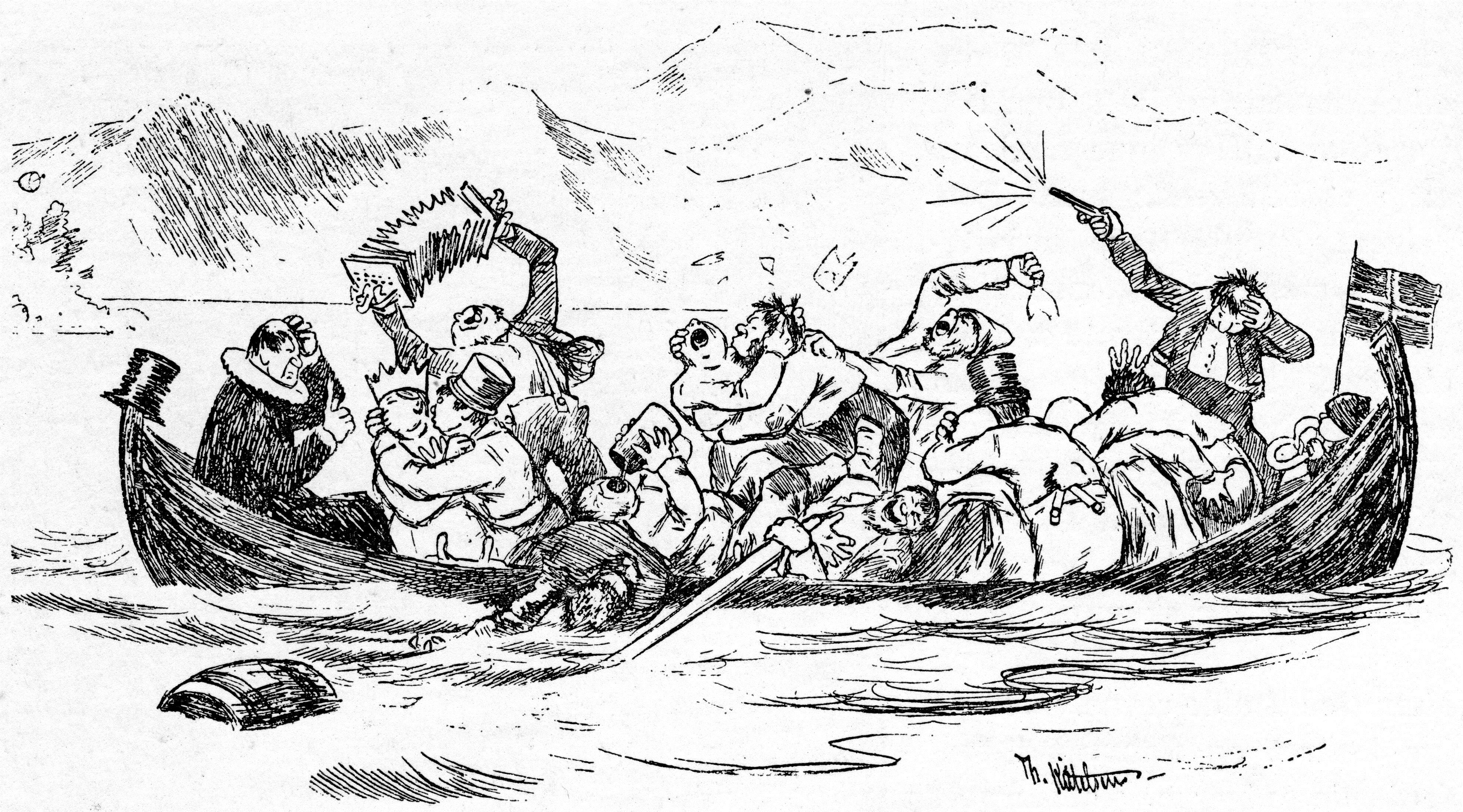
Parody, 1887
