= Sandviksfjorden =

Painting by Hans Frederik Gude

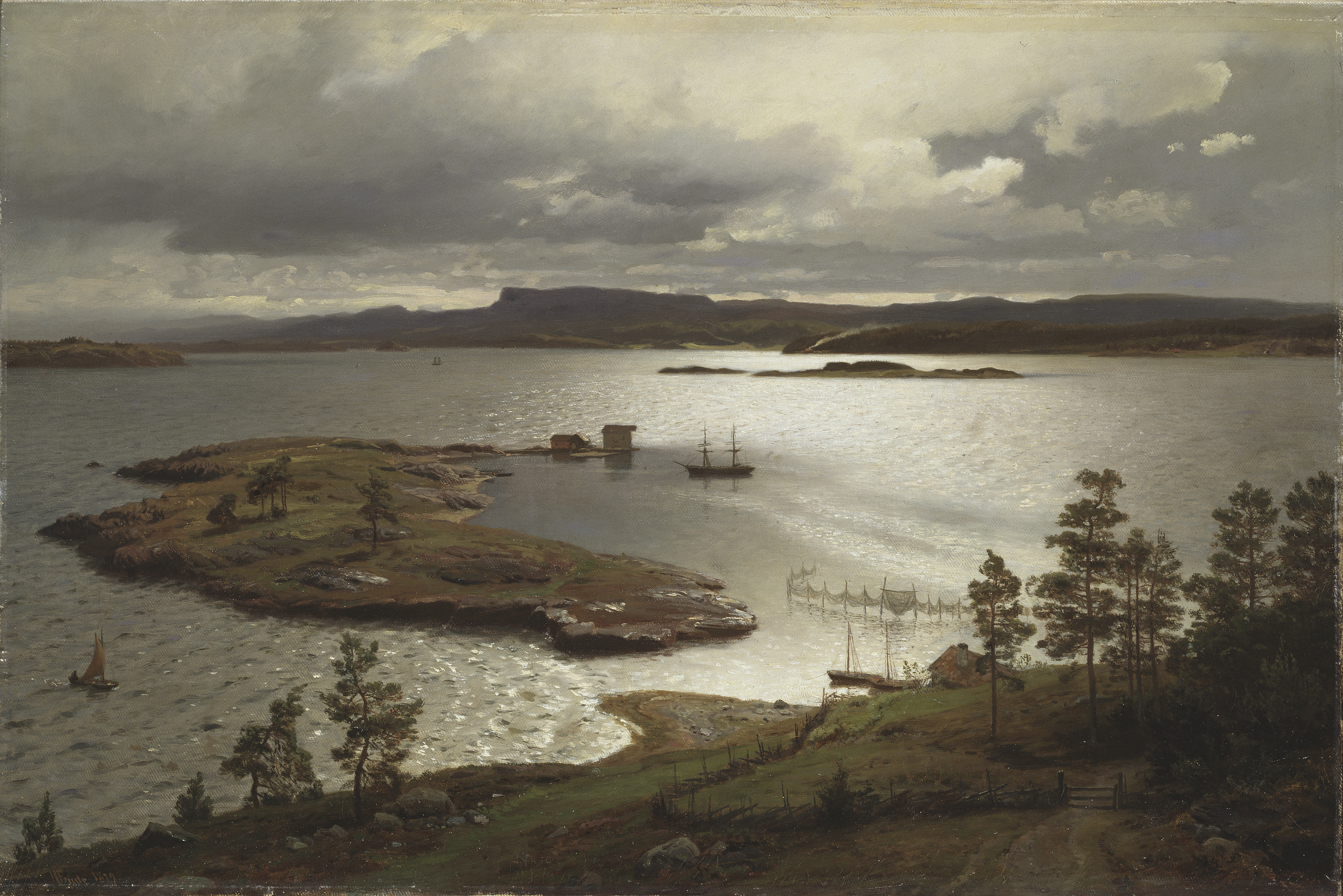
- Artist: Hans Gude
- Year: 1879
- Medium: Oil on canvas
- Dimensions: 54.5 cm × 81.5 cm (21.5 in × 32.1 in)
- Location: Nationalmuseum; Stockholm

Sandviksfjorden (English translation: The Fjord at Sandviken) is a painting by Norwegian romanticist painter Hans Gude completed in 1879.

== Scene and style ==
Gude painted scenes of the Christiania Fjord numerous times starting in 1870, and Sandviksfjorden can be seen as a representative piece of this group of works. Gude painted the piece in 1879 based on studies he had done in Snarøen during his visit there in the summer of 1873. Gude made detailed sketches of ships, and was even provided detailed models of ships by his brother, which he used to realistically render the ships in Sandviksfjorden down to the rigging and fishing tackle.

== Reception ==
Gude lists Sandviksfjorden as one of his major works, and it was purchased the same year it was painted by the Nationalmuseum in Stockholm.

However the work was not universally acclaimed, and Gude's former student Christian Krohg criticized the piece, pointing out how Gude unrealistically exaggerated the effect of sunlight by using areas of dark, mainly the boats, trees, and promitories to act as an unnaturally contrast to the light on the water. Krohg also notes that while the light falls correctly on the water, Gude has dimmed the surrounding landscape to further the contrast.

== See also ==
- List of paintings by Hans Gude
