= Agnes Charlotte Gude =

Norwegian artist (1863–1929)

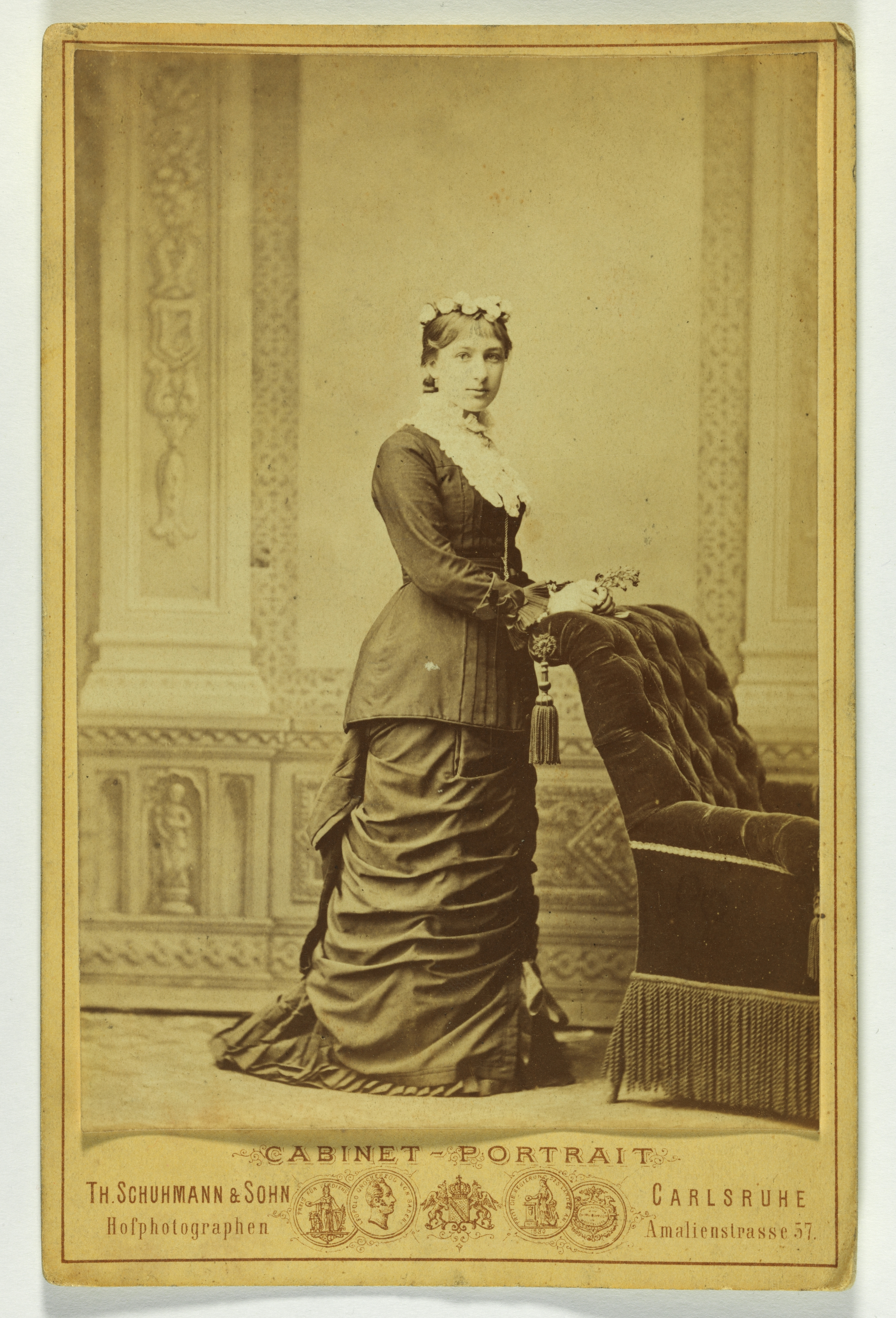
- Agnes Charlotte Gude, 1877
- Born: 1 February 1863; Betws-y-Coed, United Kingdom
- Died: 11 July 1929 (aged 66); Oslo, Norway
- Known for: Watercolour, drawing, illustration
- Movement: Art Nouveau
- Spouse: Richard Scholz

Agnes Charlotte Gude (1 February 1863 – 11 July 1929) was a Norwegian watercolorist and illustrator.

== Biography ==
Gude was born in Betws-y-Coed, Wales and raised in Karlsruhe and Berlin. Her parents were the prominent painter Hans Gude and Betsy Charlotte Juliane, née Anker (1830–1912). Among her siblings were the diplomat Ove Gude (1853–1910), the painter Nils Gude (1859–1908) and the painter Sigrid Gude, married to the German sculptor Otto Lessing (1846–1912).

Gude was married to the German painter Richard Scholz (1860–1939) from 1885 to 1903. She had three children between 1886 and 1888. Her daughter Betsy Louise Gude Scholz Agnus (1887–1979) also became an artist.

Gude received a good education in painting. She is known for several drawings, which are exhibited in the Norwegian National Gallery. However, only a few of her works are known. She illustrated a poetry collection of children's songs and rhymes edited by Mathilde Wesendonck, which was published in 1890. Twelve of her watercolors for this book were shown at the first Große Berliner Kunstausstellung in 1893. The depictions influenced by Art Nouveau belonged to the “splendid edition” of the children's book and became the property of her client Wesendonck.

== Selected works ==
- Alte und neue Kinder-Lieder und Reime. Gesammelt und gedichtet von Mathilde Wesendonck. Mit 15 Bildern und Initialen von A. Gude-Scholz. (Berlin 1890, 15 illustrations)
