= List of paintings by Hans Gude =

List of artwork by Hans Fredrik Gude

The following is a list of artwork by Hans Fredrik Gude, a Norwegian romantic painter.

== Table of Paintings ==
Painting	Name	Year	Techniques	Dimensions	Current location	Notes	Reference
	The Stave Church in Nesbyen	1845	watercolor on paper	w19 x h25 cm	Hallingdal Museum, Nesbyen		
	Landscape Study from Vågå	1846	oil on canvas, mounted on cardboard	w55 x h38 cm	National Gallery of Norway, Oslo		
	Vinterettermiddag	1847	oil on canvas	36x50.5 cm	National Gallery of Norway, Oslo		
	Høyfjellslandskap Med Opptrekkende Uvær	1848	oil on canvas	114x180 cm	Aust-Agder-Muséet, Arendal		
	Brudeferd I Hardanger; Bridal Procession on the Hardanger Fjord; Bridal Crossing in Hardanger	1848	oil on canvas	93x130 cm	National Gallery of Norway, Oslo	with Adolph Tidemand	
	Tessefossen I Vågå I Middagsbelysning	1848	oil on canvas	119x109 cm	Private Collection		
	Fjordlandskap fra Balestrand; Fjord-landscape from Balestrand	1848	oil on canvas	126.8w x 101.7h cm	Nasjonalmuseet		
	Baroniet Rosendal	1849	oil on canvas	30.5x46.5 cm	Private Collection		
	Landskap fra Hardangerfjorden	1849	oil on canvas	58x84 cm	Private Collection		
	Aften På Krøderen	1849	oil on canvas	99.5x189 cm	Private Collection	with Adolph Tidemand	
	Balestrant Ved Gården Flesje	1850	oil on canvas	125x169 cm	Oscarshall, Oslo		
	En Mølledam	1850	oil on canvas, mounted on cardboard	34x47 cm	National Gallery of Norway, Oslo		
	Lystring på Krøderen	1851	oil on canvas	115x159 cm	National Gallery of Norway, Oslo	with Adolph Tidemand	
	Likferd På Sognefjorden	1853	oil on canvas	127x187.5 cm	Private Collection	with Adolph Tidemand	
	Trestudie, Vang, Hedemarken	1853	watercolour	22.5x28 cm	National Gallery of Norway, Oslo		
	Andelven, Eidsvold	1853	pen and watercolour	29.1x46.8 cm	National Gallery of Norway, Oslo		
	Parklandskap Med Figurer	1856	oil on canvas	42.5x63.5 cm	Private Collection		
	Norsk Høyfjell	1857	oil on canvas	79.5x106 cm	National Gallery of Norway, Oslo		
	Hvile Ved Bekken	1860	oil on canvas	127.5x189 cm	National Gallery of Norway, Oslo		
	Fra Vossevangen	1860	oil on canvas	152x222 cm	Private Collection		
	A Lakeside Landscape	1861	oil on canvas, mounted on cardboard	w143 x h98 cm			
	Eføybroen, Nord-Wales	1863	oil on canvas	41.5x55.5 cm	National Gallery of Norway, Oslo		
	En Sognejakt	1866	oil on canvas, mounted on cardboard	41x62.5 cm	National Gallery of Norway, Oslo		
	Uværsluft Over Chiemsee	1867	oil on canvas, mounted on cardboard	19.5x31.5 cm	National Gallery of Norway, Oslo		
	Fiskerbarn Chiemsee	1867	oil on canvas, mounted on cardboard	25x20.5 cm	National Gallery of Norway, Oslo		
	Fra Chiemsee	1868	oil on canvas	145x208 cm	Private Collection		
	Nødhavn Ved Norskekysten; Port of Refuge on the Norwegian Coast; Norwegian Harbor of Refuge	1873	oil on canvas	182x262 cm	Private Collection		
	Fra Sandvika	1873	oil on canvas, mounted on cardboard	35.5x45.5 cm	National Gallery of Norway, Oslo		
	Innseilingen Til Christiania	1874	oil on canvas, mounted on cardboard	98x140 cm	National Gallery of Norway, Oslo		
	Vinterscene	1874	oil on canvas	22x32.4 cm	Private Collection		
	Landskap Ved Tarbert Castle, Skottland	1877	pencil and watercolour	35.8x54.4 cm	National Gallery of Norway, Oslo		
	Brodiik Arran	1877	pencil and watercolour	33.5x57.9 cm	National Gallery of Norway, Oslo		
	Åsterudtjernet, Ringerike	1878	oil on canvas	174x251 cm	National Gallery of Norway, Oslo		
	Ved Zellersee	1878	pencil and watercolour	29x61.7 cm	National Gallery of Norway, Oslo		
	Arenberg Ved Ermatingen, Bodensee	1879	pencil and watercolour	33.4x55.6 cm	National Gallery of Norway, Oslo		
	Garntørk Ermatingen	1879	pen and watercolour	34.8x40.2 cm	National Gallery of Norway, Oslo		
	Sandviksfjorden; The Fjord at Sandviken	1879	oil on canvas	54x82 cm	National Museum, Stockholm		
	Landskap Ved Stavern	1884	pencil and watercolour	30.7x56.8 cm	National Gallery of Norway, Oslo		
	Bunnefjorden Fra Malmøya	1884	gouache	41x60.9 cm	National Gallery of Norway, Oslo		
	Skogsvann Med Svaner	1885/1897	oil on canvas	39x55.5 cm	Private Collection		
	Studies of a Woman from Rügen	1887	oil on cardboard	39x55.5 cm	National Gallery of Norway, Oslo		
	Vikingskip; Viking ship	1889	gouache	32.6x56.6 cm	National Gallery of Norway, Oslo		
	Oban Bay, Skottland; Oban Bay, Scotland	1889	oil on canvas	81x123 cm	National Gallery of Norway, Oslo		
	Brenning Ved Hankø	1890	oil on canvas	180x290 cm	Private Collection		
	Molde Fra Utsikten	1890	oil on canvas	41x69 cm	Private Collection		
	Landskap Me Bondegård Molde	1890	pencil and watercolour	29.5x53.3 cm	National Gallery of Norway, Oslo		
	Fjordlandskap Udatert	1890	pencil and watercolour	27.3x37.7 cm	National Gallery of Norway, Oslo		
	En Båthavn	1891	pencil and watercolour	35.5x53.5 cm	National Gallery of Norway, Oslo		
	Solnedgang; Sunset	1894	pencil and watercolour	22x36 cm	Private Collection		
	Sommerliv Ved Stranden. Feste Ved Moss	1894	oil on canvas	74x115 cm	Private Collection		
	Ung Dame Med Syriner; Young Woman with Lilac	1897	oil on canvas, mounted on cardboard	46.2x31 cm	Private Collection		
