= Frederik Collett =

Norwegian painter (1839–1914)

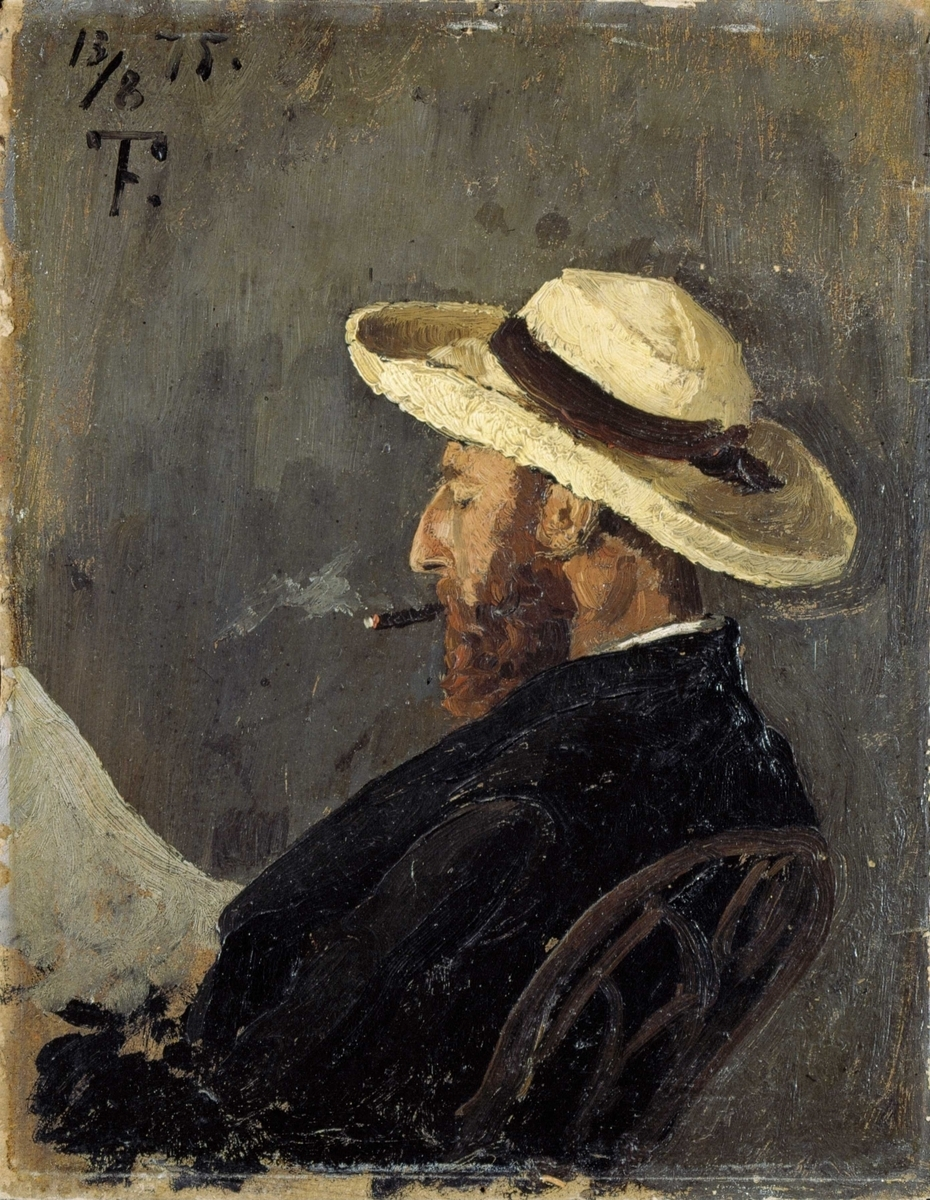
Portrait of Frederik Collett by Frits Thaulow.

Frederik Jonas Lucian Bothfield Collett (25 March 1839 – 19 April 1914) was a Norwegian painter, perhaps most associated with his winter pictures from the region around Lillehammer, Norway.

== Background ==
Collett was born at Christiania, Norway. He grew up in a prominent family of politicians and officials. He was the son of Justice Johan Collett (1800–1877) and Marie Frederikke Thomason (1810–1839). He was the grandson of Norwegian statesman, Jonas Collett. He was the only child of Johan Collett (1800-1877) and Marie Frederikke Thomason (1810-1839). His mother died three days after his birth. Frederik Collett wanted to learn more about painting, and together with his father, he visited Hans Gude in Düsseldorf. It was the start of an 8 year long education in art.

== Career ==
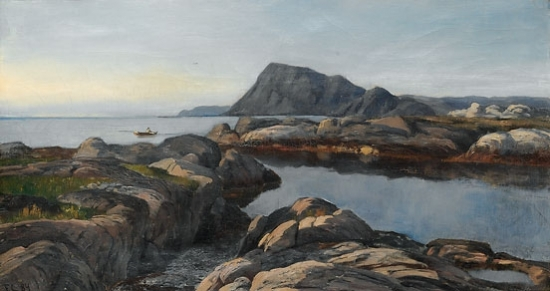
Kystlandskap med robåt (1884)

He had a small annuity which made him financially independent. Frederik Collett settled in Lillehammer, and worked as a painter. Collett traveled extensively throughout his life, but he also had a small apartment in Christiania. Travels often went to the same destination, Florø, Bergen, Jæren, Porsgrunn, and Lillehammer. In winter, he was in the interior, while in summer by the sea. Collett attended the annual Autumn Exhibition in Oslo (Høstutstillingen) 14 times from 1885 to 1912. Collett was also among the Norwegian painters who represented Norway at the major exhibitions abroad, including world exhibitions in Paris (1889 and 1900) and Chicago (1893), Stockholm and St. Petersburg, (1897).

From the 1860s until the middle of the 1870s Collett's work was strongly influenced by Gude and German Romanticism. In 1861 he went on a study trip together with Hans Gude and Peter Nicolai Arbo. In the autumn of 1862 Hans Gude set off for the Lledr Valley near Conwy in Wales, a place renowned for its picturesque scenery. Frederik Collett, together with Adolph Tidemand, visited Gude where the three traveled to Caernarvon and Holyhead. Collett's painting Fra Wales (1863) resulted from that trip.

From the 1890s, he was a natural center of a circle of artists. He maintained close friendships with fellow painters Erik Werenskiold, Lars Jorde and Gerhard Munthe. Of his total production, some 230 paintings have been recorded.

== Personal life ==
Frederik Collett never married. He died at Gjørlia ved Lillehammer in Oppland.

== Selected works ==
- Fra Wales, 1863
- Måneskinn ved Kuxhavn, 1866
- Kanalbilde, 1872
- Gran med sne, 1875
- Det gamle rikshospital, 1877
- Sommerlandskap med høns, 1879
- Fra Grez, 1879
- Ved Mesnas utløp, 1881
