= Nødhavn Ved Norskekysten =

Painting by Hans Gude

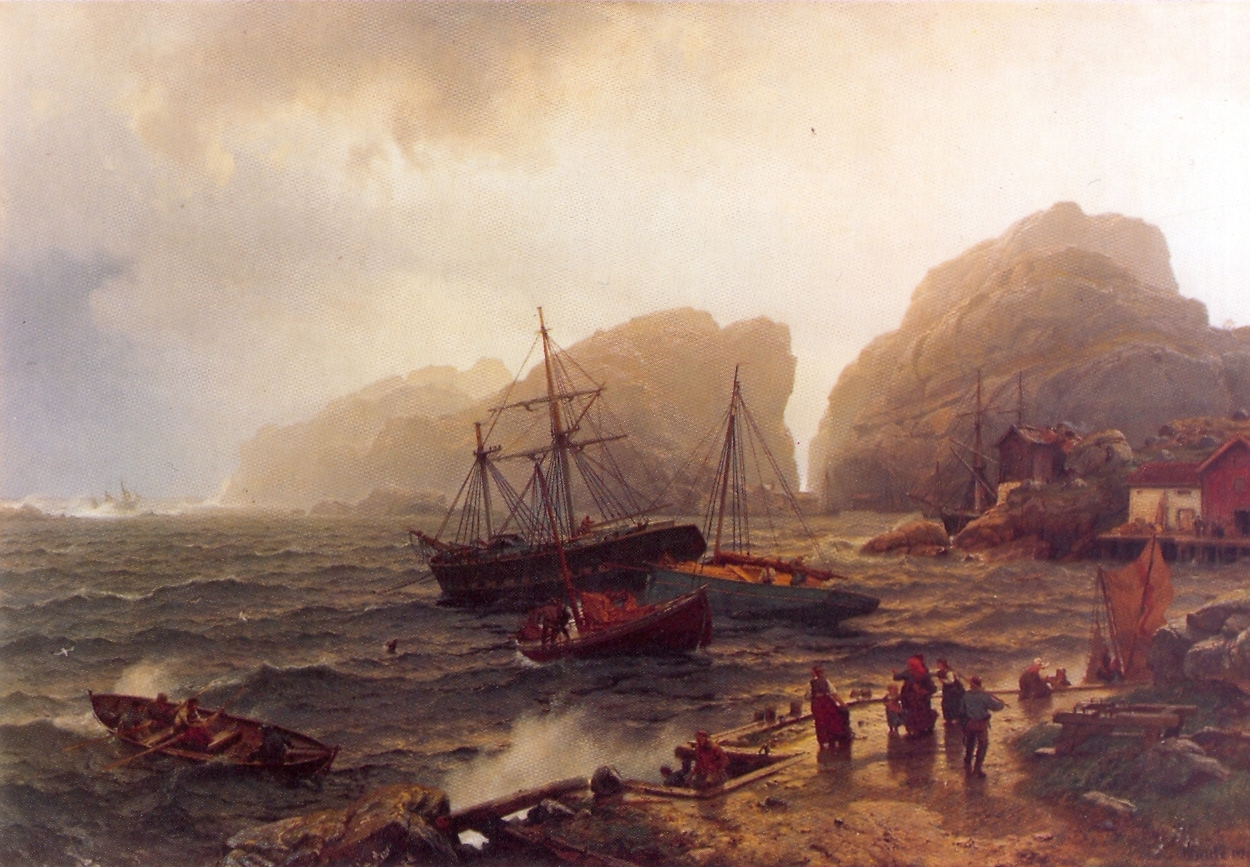
- Artist: Hans Gude
- Year: 1873
- Medium: Oil on canvas
- Dimensions: 182 cm × 262 cm (72 in × 103 in)
- Location: Private Collection

Nødhavn Ved Norskekysten (English translation: Port of Refuge on the Norwegian Coast or Norwegian Harbor of Refuge) is a painting by Norwegian romanticist painter Hans Gude completed in 1873.

== Exhibition history ==
The painting was first shown at the World Exhibition in Vienna in 1873 where it won a gold medal. It was later displayed at an international exhibition of art at the Academy of Art in Berlin in 1896 while Gude was a professor at the Academy, and yet later still it was shown in Dresden in 1904, the year after Gude's death.

== Scene and style ==
The painting shows a realistic rendering of a storm hitting a Norwegian harbor, with a brig stranded in the distant breakers. The painting is divided into a foreground, where women and children watch the rescue effort; a middle ground, where various moored ships bob in the strong waves; and a background, where wavelike rocks enclose the refuge point and bring the eye down to the stranded brig. The colors used are predominantly the blue-grey of the sea and the beige of the reflections on the sea which serve to unify the piece. Various elements of the scene including the waterfront buildings, the groups of figures, and the departing rowboat, would be reused by Gude in later works.

== Ownership ==
In 1875, the painting was purchased by the Bremen Art Society, although Gude incorrectly identifies them as the Stadtgalerie Bremen in his notes about the sale. In 1907 the painting was transferred to the Kunsthalle Bremen. In 1920 the painting was auctioned off due in part to changing tastes in art and the painting's large size (4.78 m^{2} or 51.5 sq ft) which made it difficult to store. In 1932 the painting was auctioned off again in Oslo where it was purchased by its current owner.

== See also ==
- List of paintings by Hans Gude
