= Nils Gude =

Norwegian painter

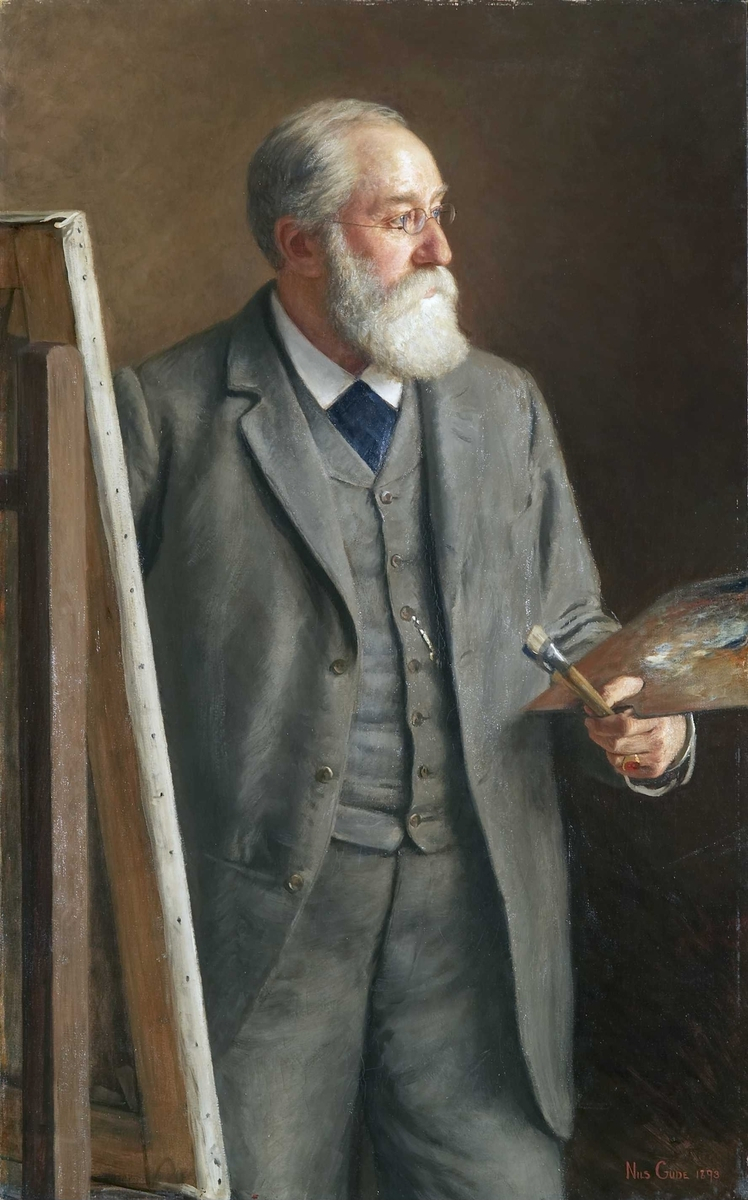
Portrait by Nils Gude of his father Hans Gude (Oslo Museum)

Nils Gude (4 April 1859 in Düsseldorf, Kingdom of Prussia – 24 December 1908 in Christiania) was a Norwegian portrait painter.

== Biography ==
Nils Gude was the son of the prominent painter Hans Gude (1825–1903) and the brother of diplomat Ove Gude (1853–1910). He was born in Düsseldorf, Kingdom of Prussia where his father was teaching at the Düsseldorf school of painting. He studied under his father, before entering the Academy of Fine Arts, Karlsruhe in 1877 to study under Eduard Hildebrandt and Karl Gussow. He continued his studies in Berlin 1881–82, and later relocated to Christiania (now Oslo), Norway.

Gude is known for several portraits of prominent figures of the day, including portraits of his own father and of Henrik Ibsen.
