= Hans Gude =

Norwegian painter (1825–1903)

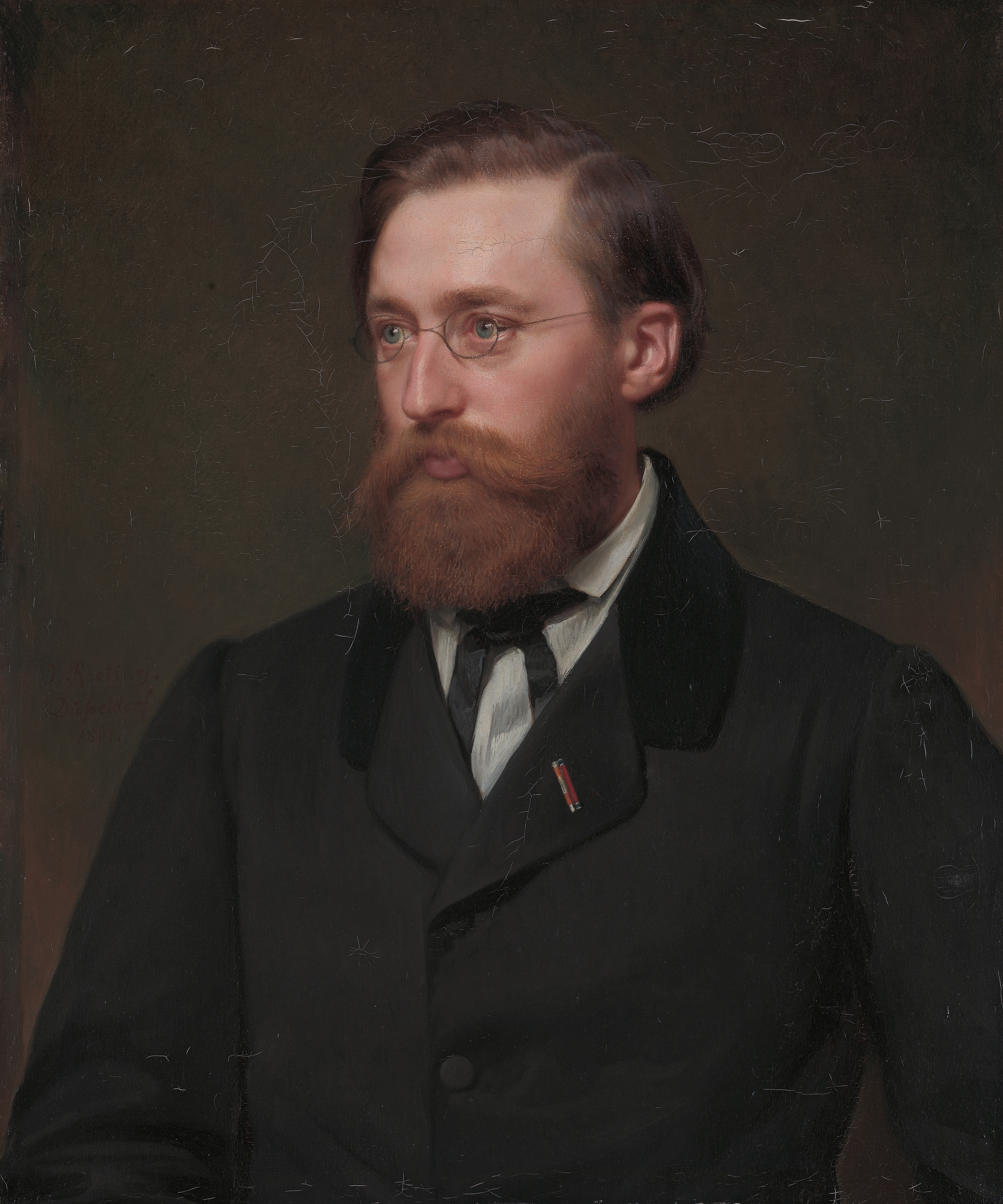
- Hans Gude
- Born: March 13, 1825; Christiania, United Kingdoms of Sweden and Norway
- Died: August 17, 1903 (aged 78); Berlin, German Empire
- Resting place: Cemetery of Our Saviour in Oslo, Norway
- Education: Johannes Flintoe; Andreas Achenbach; Johann Wilhelm Schirmer
- Known for: Painting
- Movement: Norwegian romantic nationalism
- Awards: St. Olav Grand Cross; 1894

Hans Fredrik Gude (March 13, 1825 – August 17, 1903) was a Norwegian romanticist painter and is considered along with Johan Christian Dahl to be one of Norway's foremost landscape painters. He has been called a mainstay of Norwegian National Romanticism. He is associated with the Düsseldorf school of painting and is best known for landscapes of Norway’s mountains, fjords, and coast.

Gude’s work developed gradually, moving from idealized inland landscapes to seascapes and coastal scenes from the 1860s onward. After early collaborations with Adolph Tidemand due to difficulties with figure painting, he later incorporated figures independently. He worked primarily in oil but increasingly emphasized en plein air practice and, later in life, watercolor and gouache. In parallel with his artistic career, Gude exerted major influence as a teacher, serving as a professor in Düsseldorf, Karlsruhe, and Berlin and mentoring generations of Norwegian artists. He received numerous honors, including the Grand Cross of the Order of St. Olav.

== Biography ==
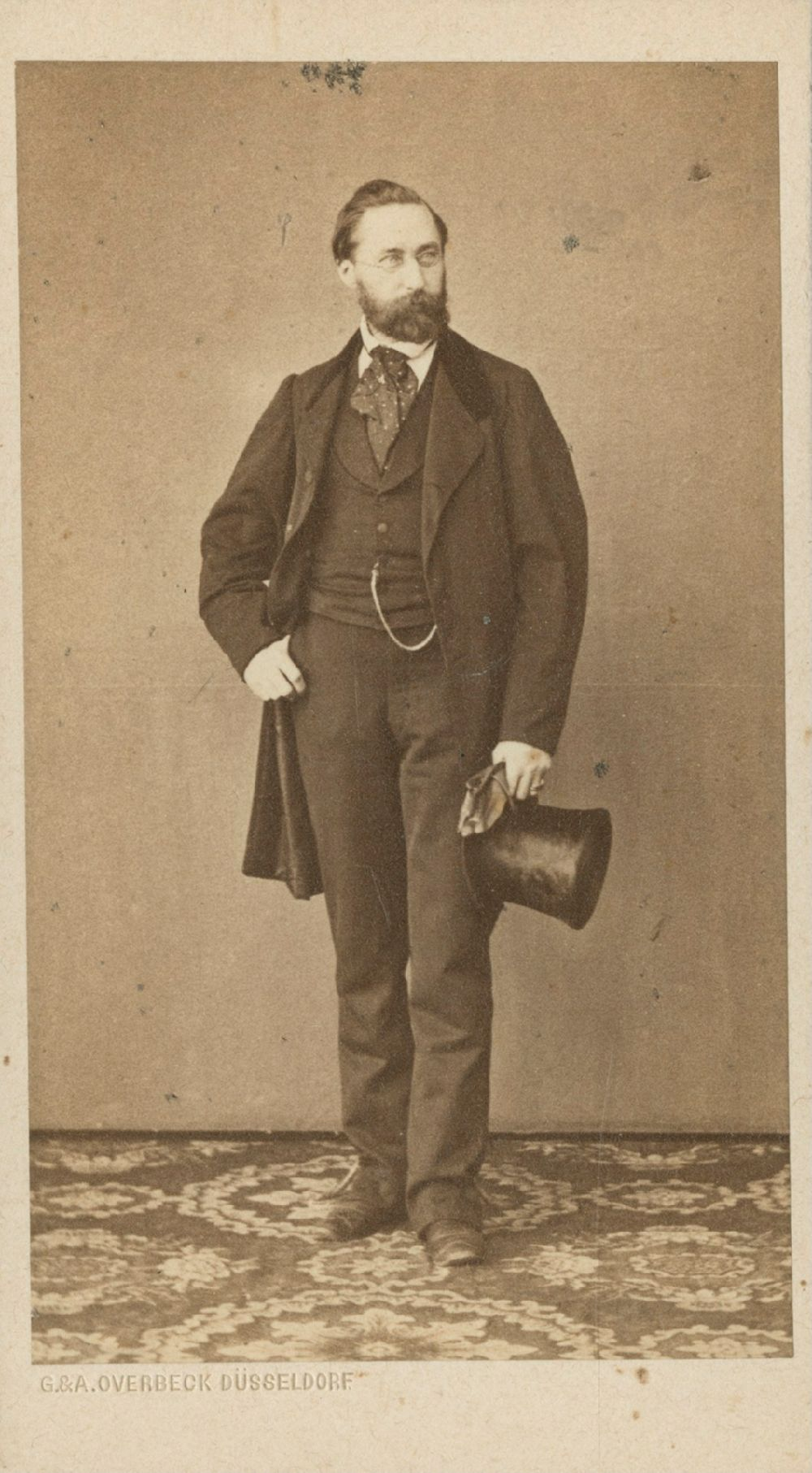
Hans Fredrik Gude by G. & A. Overbeck (firm), c. 1868

Gude was born in Christiania in 1825 the son of Ove Gude, a judge, and Marie Elisabeth Brandt.

On July 25, 1850, Gude married Betsy Charlotte Juliane Anker, the daughter of General Erik Anker, in Christiania (today called Oslo).

He was the father of painter Nils Gude and watercolorist and illustrator Agnes Charlotte Gude. His daughter Sigrid married German sculptor Otto Lessing.

Gude began his artistic career with private lessons from Johannes Flintoe, and by 1838 he was attending Flintoe's evening classes at the Royal School of Drawing in Christiania. In the autumn of 1841 Johan Sebastian Welhaven suggested that the young Gude should be sent to Düsseldorf to further his education in the arts.

== Academy of Art in Düsseldorf ==
At the Academy of Art in Düsseldorf Gude encountered Johann Wilhelm Schirmer – a professor in landscape painting – who advised him to give up his ambitions of being a painter and to return to his regular studies before it was too late. Gude was rejected by the academy, but attracted the attention of Andreas Achenbach who provided him with private lessons.

=== As a student ===
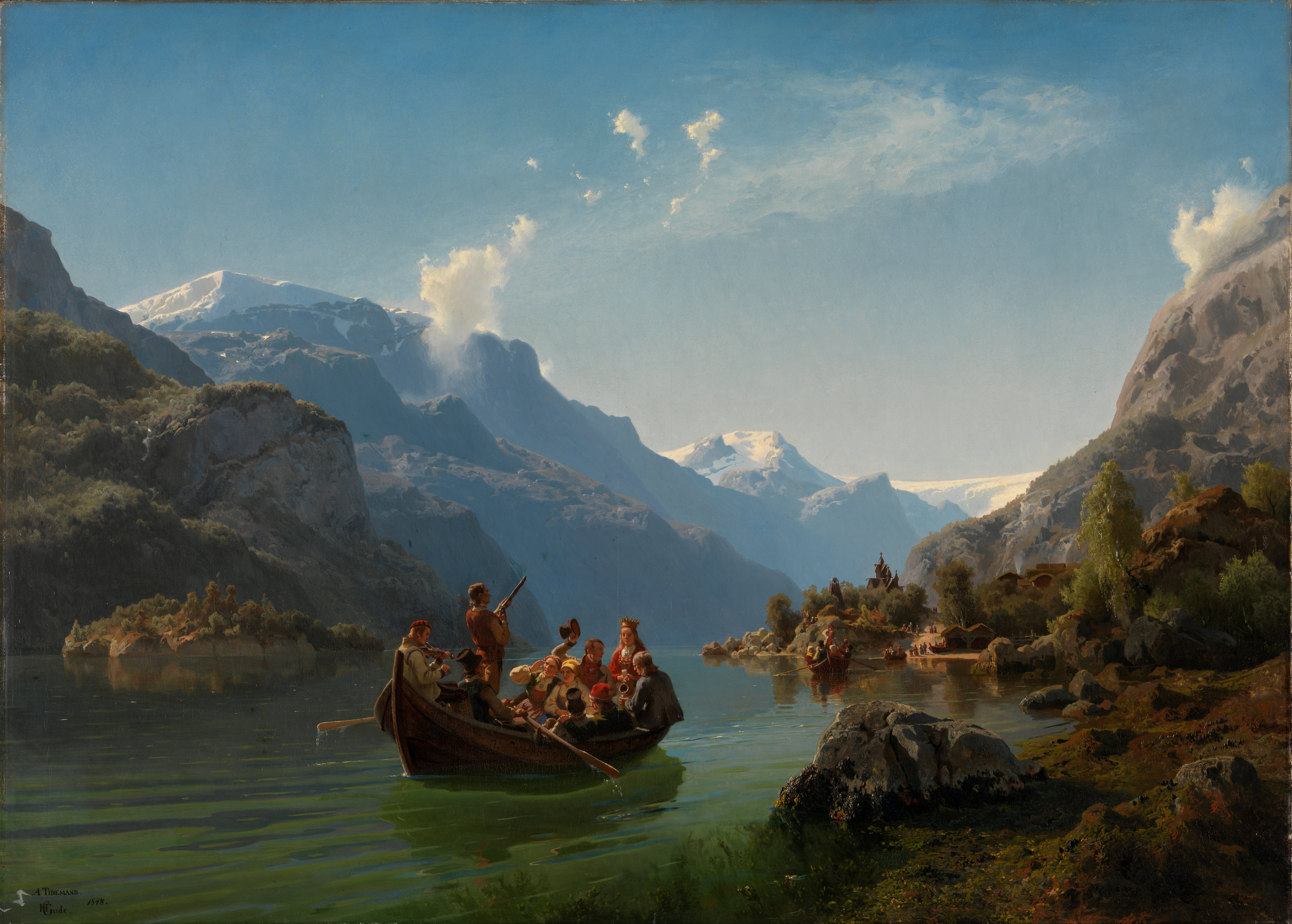
Bridal Procession on the Hardangerfjord, by Adolph Tidemand and Hans Gude

Gude was finally accepted into the academy in the autumn of 1842 and joined Schirmer's landscape painting class where he made quick progress. The landscape painting class at the academy was new at the time, having been founded in 1839 as a counterpart to the more long standing figure painting class.

At the time figure painting was considered a more prestigious genre than landscape painting as it was thought only through painting the human body could true beauty be expressed.

Gude had difficulty with figure drawing initially and so collaborated with Adolph Tidemand in some of his paintings, drawing the landscape himself and allowing Tidemand to paint the figures.

Gude, along with most of the class of twelve, received a grade of "good" his first semester and was described as "talented". On his report card for the 1843–44 school year he was the only student to be described as "very talented", and the report for his fourth year said that he "paints Norwegian scenery in a truthful and distinctive manner".

While Gude was a student, two different trends in landscaping were developing at the academy: a romantic trend and a classical trend. The romanticists depicted wild, untamed wildernesses with dark forests, soaring peaks, and rushing water to capture the terrifying and overpowering aspects of nature. They used rich, saturated colors with strong contrast of light and shadow. The classicists were more interested in recreating landscapes from the heroic or mythical past and often set them in the midst of religious or historical events. The classicists focused on lines and clarity in their compositions. It was through Achenbach – Gude's first teacher upon arriving in Düsseldorf – that he was exposed to the romanticist tradition, while it was through his classes with and later time teaching for Schirmer that he was exposed to the classicist traditions.

In 1827 Schirmer and Carl Friedrich Lessing founded a Society for Landscape Composition that would meet a few times each year at Schirmer's home where Schirmer would offer advice on the composition of landscape paintings. Fifteen years later Gude began attending the meetings of the society with other students from his class, but as he progressed to greater levels of realism Gude began to make it clear that he did not agree with the ideas of composition Schirmer put forward during the meetings, saying specifically:

I painted a large mountain view for which my studies of the Rondane Mountains provided the subject, and I had severe problems because Schirmer did not approve of the realistic rendering, and his suggestion that I should group the mountains more in accordance with the Classical ideal was impossible for me to accept.

— Hans Gude

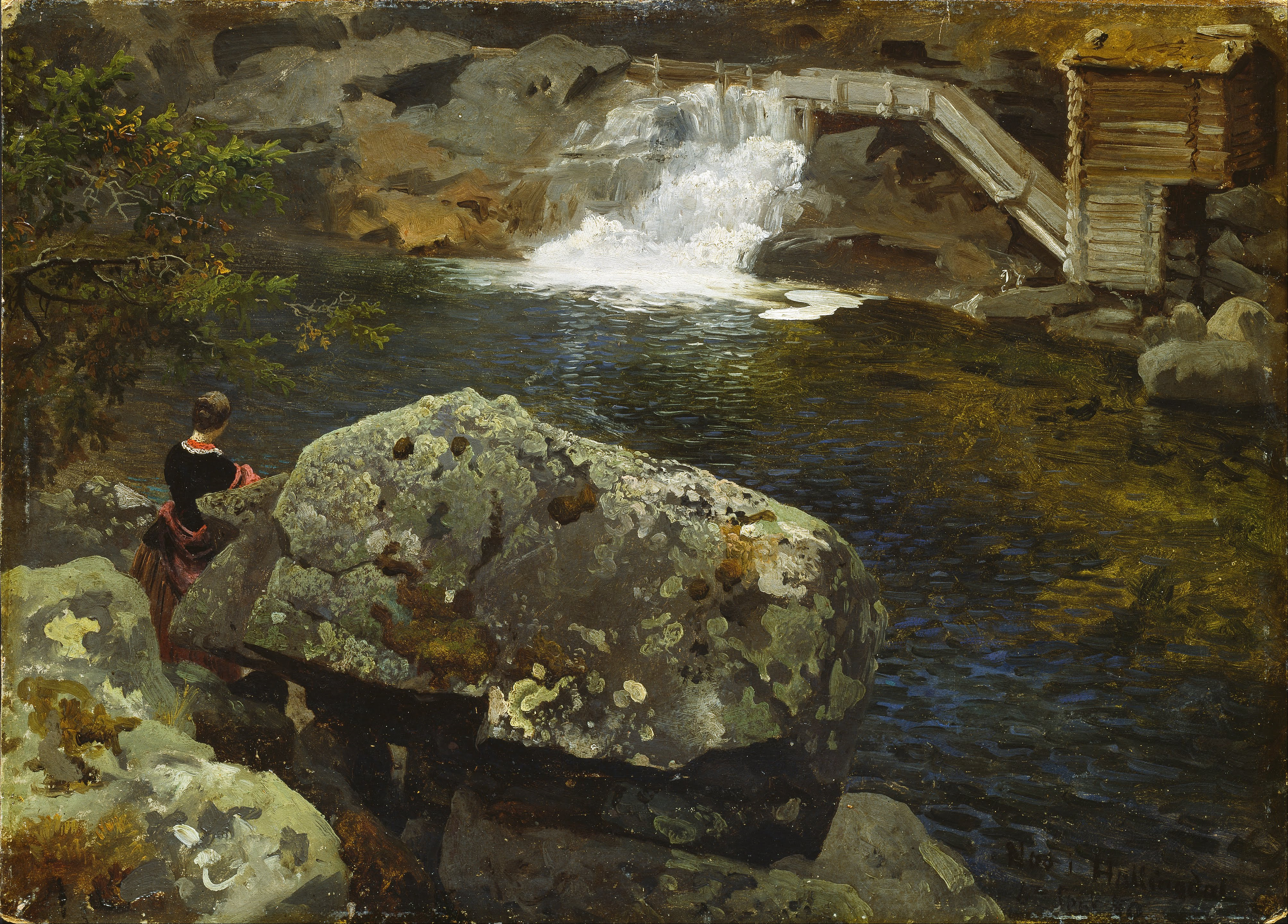
Gude's By the Mill Pond, (1850)

In Düsseldorf Gude met Carl Friedrich Lessing who, while initially aloof, became Gude's friend and colleague. Their relationship was such a close one that Gude's eldest daughter eventually married one of Lessing's sons. The two artists differed in style though, with Lessing painting dramatic, historical works while Gude never once introduced historical events into his own paintings.

Gude served as a student teacher at the academy until 1844, before leaving to live in Christiania.

=== Professorship ===
Gude spent forty-five years as an art professor and so he played an important role in the development of Norwegian art by acting as a mentor to three generations of Norwegian artists. Young Norwegian artists flocked to wherever Gude was teaching, first at the Academy of Art in Düsseldorf and later at the School of Art in Karlsruhe.

He was first appointed professor of landscape painting in 1854 at the academy replacing his former teacher Schirmer. Gude was twenty-nine when appointed, making him the youngest professor at the academy. His appointment was partially political, in a conflict between Rhineland and Prussian interests Gude was seen as a neutral candidate because of his Norwegian roots. Gude was recommended for the position by the current Director of the academy Wilhelm von Schadow, but only after Andreas Achenbach, Oswald Achenbach, and Lessing had refused the post due to lack of suitable pay. In regards to his position and compensation, Gude wrote:

About this post of professor I can only say I cannot comprehend why I should not accept pay for being a teacher, since I really have to have pupils. All those who wished that I should be their teacher are here, and poor as church mice. If I become professor, they can now enter the Academy. I will in any case be here for many years, so I might just as well paint in a studio twice as big and grand as any private one, especially if I receive a salary into the bargain. When I become tired of it, I can always hand in my notice.

— Hans Gude

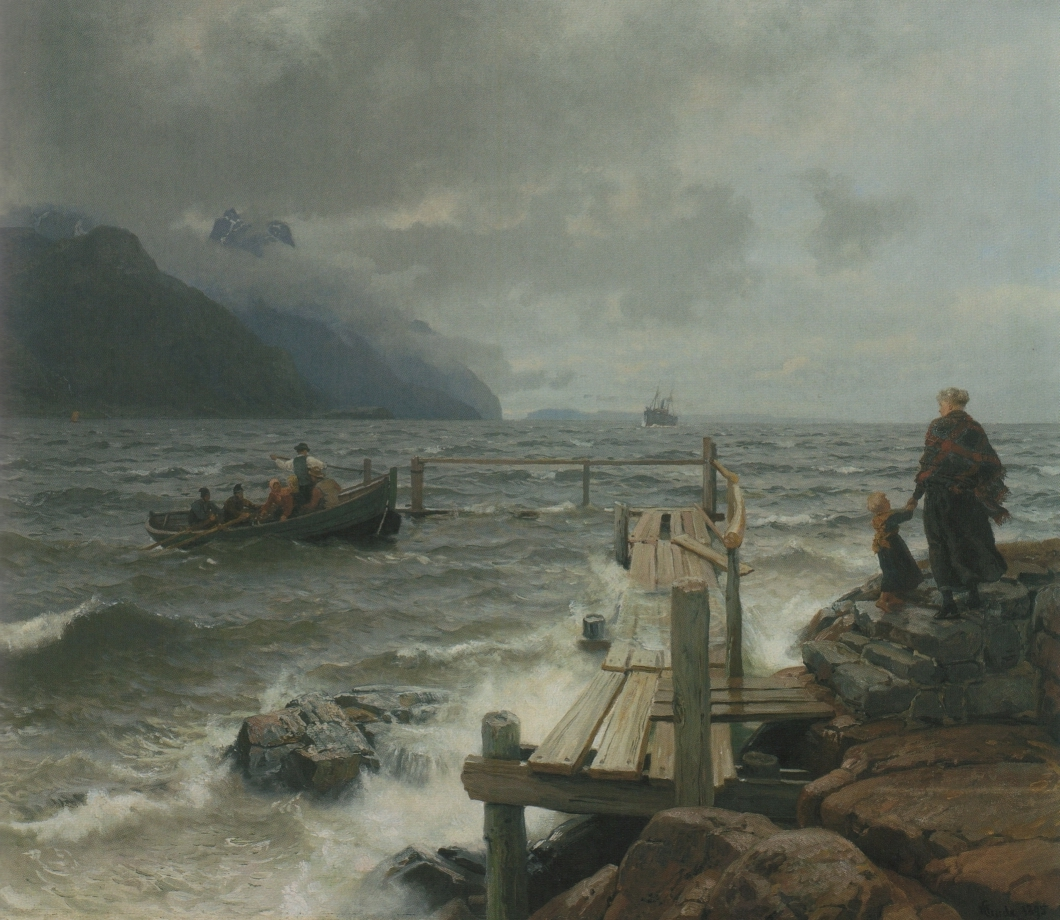
Fresh breeze off the Norwegian coast

Throughout his tenure, Gude had private pupils in addition to his normal classes. As a professor Gude taught six hours of class, held two hours of office hours, took turns with other professors supervising the nude drawing class and attended staff meetings.

In 1857 Gude handed in his resignation, officially citing family considerations and failing health as his reasons for resigning, although in his memoirs he blamed opposition and backbiting from two of his pupils.

The landscape painting professorship was the bottom of the pay scale at the academy, and Gude was one of the few professors to be refused a raise when others received them in 1855. Others have suggested that Gude wished to leave the academy for fear of becoming stuck in a rut artistically.

Gude received better treatment from the academy after he turned in his resignation, and it would take him a full five years to finally leave Düsseldorf. Although professors at the academy complained that their teaching prevented them from undertaking more lucrative endeavors, Gude was able to sell enough works to afford a modest house in Düsseldorf which stood in what is now Hofgarten.

=== Norwegian or German art ===
By the mid-19th century the academy in Düsseldorf had become a center for training Norwegian artists, but within Norway there arose a debate as to whether the art was truly Norwegian as it did not originate in Norway, and was in fact produced by artists who had been trained in Germany. The debate was sparked by proposals to build an art school in Norway, and it was therefore essential for supporters of a Norwegian academy to argue that Norwegian values could not be instilled in the artists if they had to go abroad.

In a letter to Jørgen Moe Gude writes that he saw possibility for his own development in Düsseldorf, and that even if it would cause him to be known as a German artist instead of a Norwegian, he would not be ashamed of the fact. In defense of Norwegian artists at the academy, Gude writes that they were not simply imitating German artists:

If we learn something from Achenbach and Lessing, it is certainly not to our detriment; no one has ever said about me or Tidemand or, so far as I know, any of us Norwegian Düsseldorfers that we copy and imitate.

— Hans Gude

Gude was convinced that for Norwegian artists at the academy it was impossible to escape their heritage and that Norway influenced their art whether they wanted it to or not. On this subject he wrote:

[...] and you, my compatriots in Norway, have no grounds for complaining that we have forgotten the dear, familiar and specific character with which God has endowed our land and our nation. That is so firmly entrenched in our being that it finds expression, whether we like it or not. Do not, therefore, insult us further with such [an accusation]; it hurts our feelings, and thereby proves how unfounded it is, for otherwise it would be easy to treat it with indifference.

— Hans Gude

Von Schadow however argued that Gude's art was in fact German in an attempt to defend his nomination of Gude to succeed Schirmer. He wrote of Gude that "His education is totally German, his style unwontedly elevated."

== Wales ==
Eføybroen, Nord-Wales
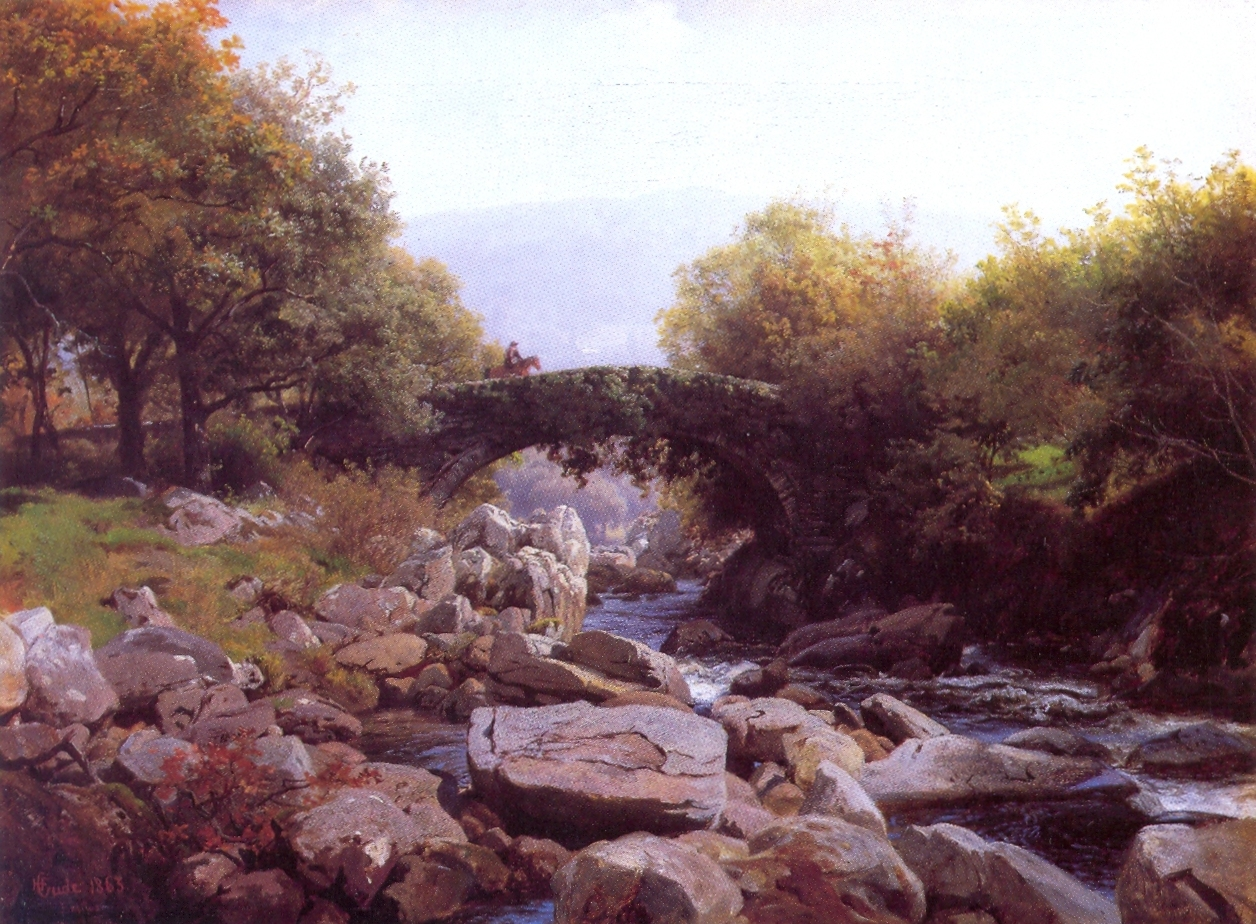
- Artist: Hans Gude
- Year: 1863
- Medium: Oil on canvas
- Dimensions: 41.5 cm × 55.5 cm (16.3 in × 21.9 in)
- Location: National Gallery of Norway, Oslo

Many of Gude's peers moved on from the academy in Düsseldorf to other art institutes, but Gude decided to seek more direct contact with nature. Gude had gained a foothold in the British art market in the 1850s after his works were accepted into the galleries of Francis Egerton, 1st Earl of Ellesmere and the Marquess of Lansdowne, and so when an English art dealer and former student of Gude – Mr. Stiff – suggested Gude might find success in England, he was quick to respond.

In the autumn of 1862 Gude set off for the Lledr Valley near Conwy, Wales, a place renowned for its picturesque scenery, was already home to a colony of British plein-air artists. While small groups of artists living in the countryside in order to inspire each other, be closer to their subject and escape the city were common, Gude was one of the first Norwegian artists to live in such a manner. Gude rented a house overlooking River Lledr where he painted one of the ancient Roman bridges which was popular with artists of the time.

Gude reports that the British and Welsh landscape painters were disdainful of artists from the continent, and that they used a very different style of painting from the continental artists. Whereas Gude and fellow continental artists would go out in nature and make sketches to act as studies for studio works, the British and Welsh painters set up their easels in the field and worked on their paintings with their subjects in front of them.

Gude attempted to improve his reputation among the local painters with exhibitions at the Royal Academy's spring shows in London in 1863 and 1864, but both were flops that Gude described as "useful but bitter medicine". Despite these setbacks – furthered by the strain the trip had put on Gude's finances due to lack of paintings being sold – Gude felt the trip was of great benefit to himself as an artist, writing to his brother-in-law Theodor Kjerulf:

It was sad to leave the lovely yet wild scenery that had become so dear to us, and a peaceful, quiet home it had been. My English stay was of great benefit to me in that I freed myself from many of the prevailing studio maxims by being alone and in a landscape so new to me that it forced me to observe more keenly.

— Hans Gude

While in Wales Gude was visited by Adolph Tidemand together with Frederik Collett, and the three traveled to Caernarvon and Holyhead from which Gude observed his first real Atlantic storm.

== Baden School of Art ==
Fra Chiemsee
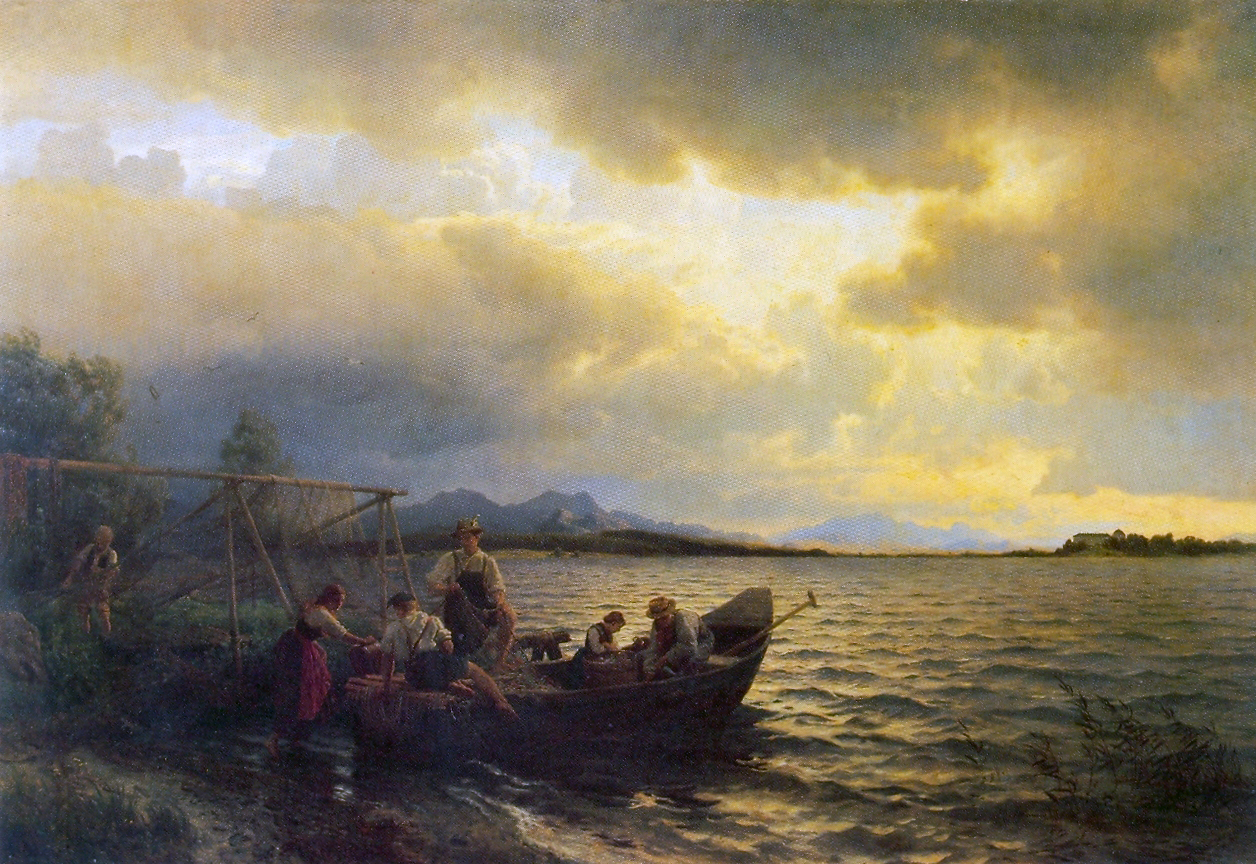
- Artist: Hans Gude
- Year: 1868
- Medium: Oil on canvas
- Dimensions: 145 cm × 208 cm (57 in × 82 in)
- Location: Private Collection

In December 1863 Gude was offered and accepted a professorship at the Baden School of Art in Karlsruhe where he would once again succeed Schirmer, and so he left Wales. Gude was hesitant to take the position as he felt that it was working for the enemy but was unable to support himself in Norway due to the lack of an art school. He wrote about his thoughts on the position to Kjerulf, stating:

At this time I feel oppressively and profoundly what it means to float about the world without a mother country – now I have obtained a post, and shall serve to the best of my powers the country that may shortly be at open war with my own native land; I shall express no sympathies and be deaf to what goes on beyond the walls of my own studio; that which makes hearts at home beat faster will not exist for me; and how offensive and unbearable it will be to watch the enthusiasm displayed around me for the rights of a German nationality, while my own nation perhaps bleeds to death in a struggle for existence. On the other hand, how serious my commitments are to my wife and children; and I shall use my talents where I am permitted to – at home I can make no use of them, and in two to three years I would come to the end of my career and sink into deep misery with all my children – I am sure of that.

— Hans Gude

It is suspected that Gude was offered the professorship due to a recommendation from Lessing. When Gude accepted the position at Karlsruhe the flow of Norwegian painters to the Düsseldorf Academy redirected to Karlsruhe, which would produce many of the Norwegian painters of the 1860s and 1870s, among them Frederik Collett, Johan Martin Nielssen, Kitty L. Kielland, Nicolai Ulfsten, Eilif Peterssen, Marcus Grønvold, Otto Sinding, Christian Krohg and Frits Thaulow.

In Karlsruhe Gude continued to faithfully reproduce the landscapes he saw, a style that he passed on to his students by taking them to Chiemsee to paint the lake en plein air. While on these trips Gude and his pupils often encountered Eduard Schleich the Elder with his own students from Munich who were, as Gude described, only out to capture the mood of the scene and were skeptical of the advantages of painting in the sunshine. Gude also took special interest in how light reflected in water while in Karlsruhe, as well as expanding his study of the human figure.

Although Gude rarely portrayed humans for their own sake, he began populating his paintings with convincing, if sometimes anatomically incorrect, individuals.

Gude painted Fra Chiemsee while at Karlsruhe. The painting which was shown in Vienna was so enthusiastically received that it was purchased by the Kunsthistorisches Hofmuseum for display, won Gude a number of medals, and earned him membership in the Academy of Fine Arts Vienna.

The school in Karlsruhe was founded by the Grand Duke of Baden whom Gude had good relations with. Because of this fact Gude received better pay than at the Düsseldorf Academy, had spacious and rent-free accommodations and was given generous periods of leave which allowed him to travel in the summer to perform studies for future paintings.

Gude served as the director of Karlsruhe from 1866 to 1868 and again from 1869 to 1870, where he introduced several of his own educational principles designed to develop pupils' individual talent. But Gude's reign as director at Karlsruhe was not without resistance to his methods, and it is this opposition that he cites as his reason for visiting the Berlin Academy of Art as early as 1874 in search of better conditions.

Because of Gude's visits to Berlin, his relation with the Grand Duke became strained as the Grand Duke felt that the concessions he had made to Gude were so great that Gude should be grateful and not look for a professorship elsewhere. Gude remained at Karlsruhe for six more years after his first visits to the Berlin Academy of Art, but in 1880 he decided to retire from the Karlsruhe school to take up a position in Berlin.

== Berlin Academy of Art ==
Gude also served as a professor at the Berlin Academy of Art from 1880 to 1901, leading the master studio in landscape painting. Unfortunately, he attracted few Norwegians to the Berlin Academy because by this time Berlin had been surpassed in prestige in the eyes of young Norwegian artists by Paris.

His position at the Academy of Art gave him a spot on the academy's Senate. The Senate was responsible for upholding "all the artistic interests of the state" and membership was a mark of the highest official recognition of Gude's work.

In 1895, the Christiania Art Society held a comprehensive retrospective of Gude's works including his paintings, oil studies, watercolors, sketches and etchings. When asked what should be shown at the exhibition Gude replied that "[...]perhaps room could be found for studies and drawings; I rather think that these will meet with interest. They are also (unfortunately) of greater artistic value." By the time of the exhibition Gude had abandoned his previous style of painting large-scale compositions based on studies, and was working in mediums other than oil. In Berlin Gude began working more heavily in gouache and watercolor in an effort to preserve the 'freshness' of his art. Although Gude did not heavily exhibit his watercolors they still gained admiration from fellow painters, including Harriet Backer who said:

I believe that if Gude exhibited watercolours and study drawings, he would have the warmest admirers among painters. [...] Let it rather happen now, while there can be controversy and a row and some lively discussion about his art[...].

— Harriet Backer

Gude would spend a few weeks each summer near the Baltic coast where he drew material for numerous paintings of Ahlbeck and Rügen. Although Gude filled these paintings with more figures than his earlier works, his focus was still on accurately capturing the scene and especially the landscape.

As the century drew to a close the established art academies faced 'secession' movements from groups of artists looking to branch off into different styles. Gude rallied around his friend Anton von Werner in defending the academies, going so far as to mock "the so-called Symbolism" movement. As Gude approached the end of his life he felt more and more unable to keep up with the changes in the art world. After a disappointing exhibition in Kristiania in 1902 Gude wrote to Johan Martin Nielssen:

All I have heard about it [the exhibition] are your and [Wilhelm] Holter's letters, and that acclaim has consoled me after the scorn I have had to suffer in common with many an elderly artist. You recognized several studies from my portfolios, but all of them were more or less unfinished, and over the last two winters I finished them, truly con amore. I had serious scruples when I decided to exhibit them, because I knew full well how different the opinion of the modernists is, and it is quite understandable that they want to 'take the helm' alone!

— Hans Gude

In 1880 Gude had between five and eight students, but this number had shrunk to two or three by 1890. In part this reduction of pupils was due to a lack of interest in the Berlin academy, as explained to Gude by Prince Eugén, Duke of Närke who wrote that he, as well as numerous other young artists, had more of a taste for French art than German.

Gude retired from the Berlin Academy in 1901. He died two years later in Berlin in 1903.

== Works ==
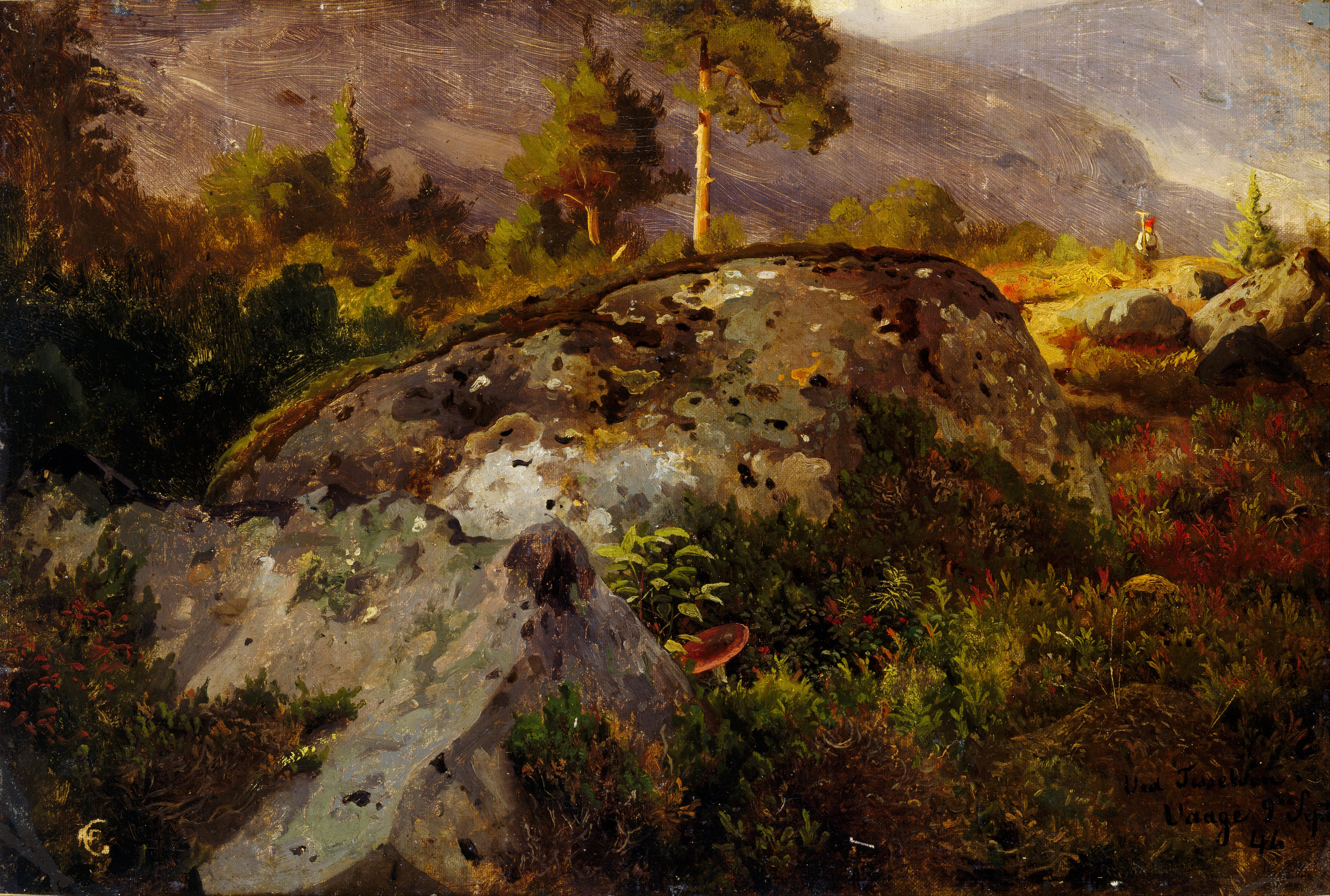
Landscape Study from Vågå, 1846

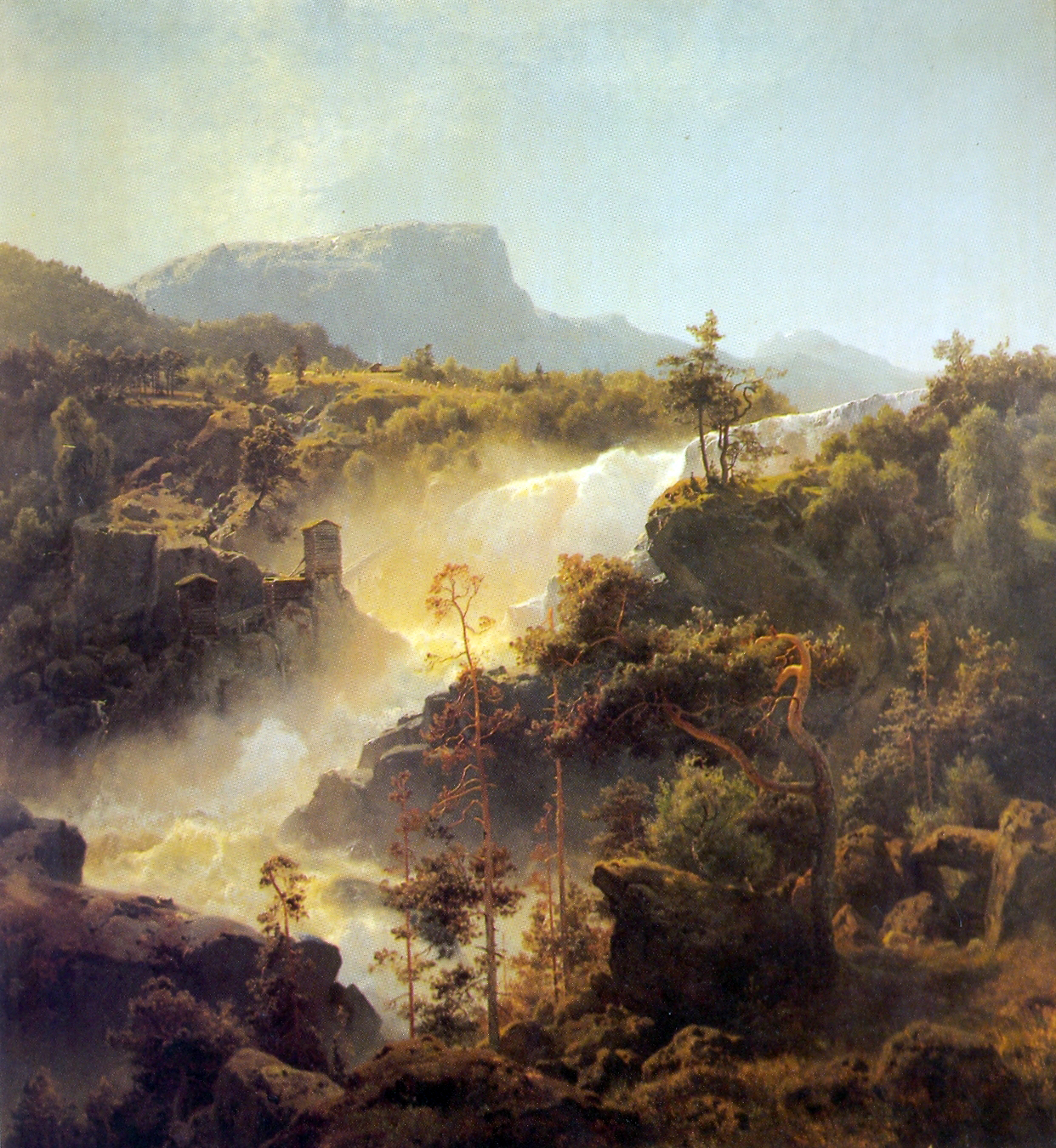
Tessefossen I Vaga I Middagsbelysning, 1848

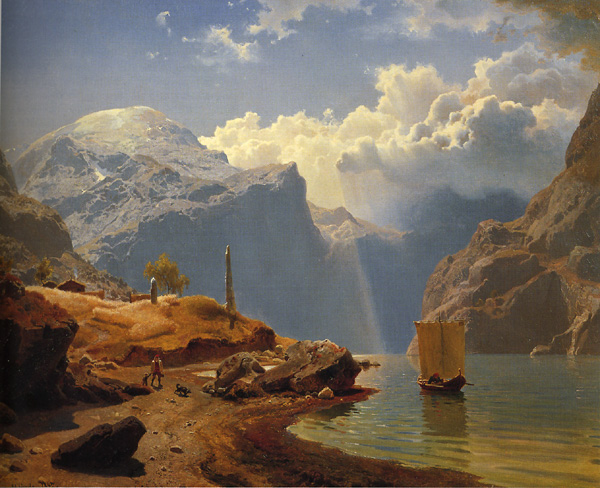
Hardanger fjord

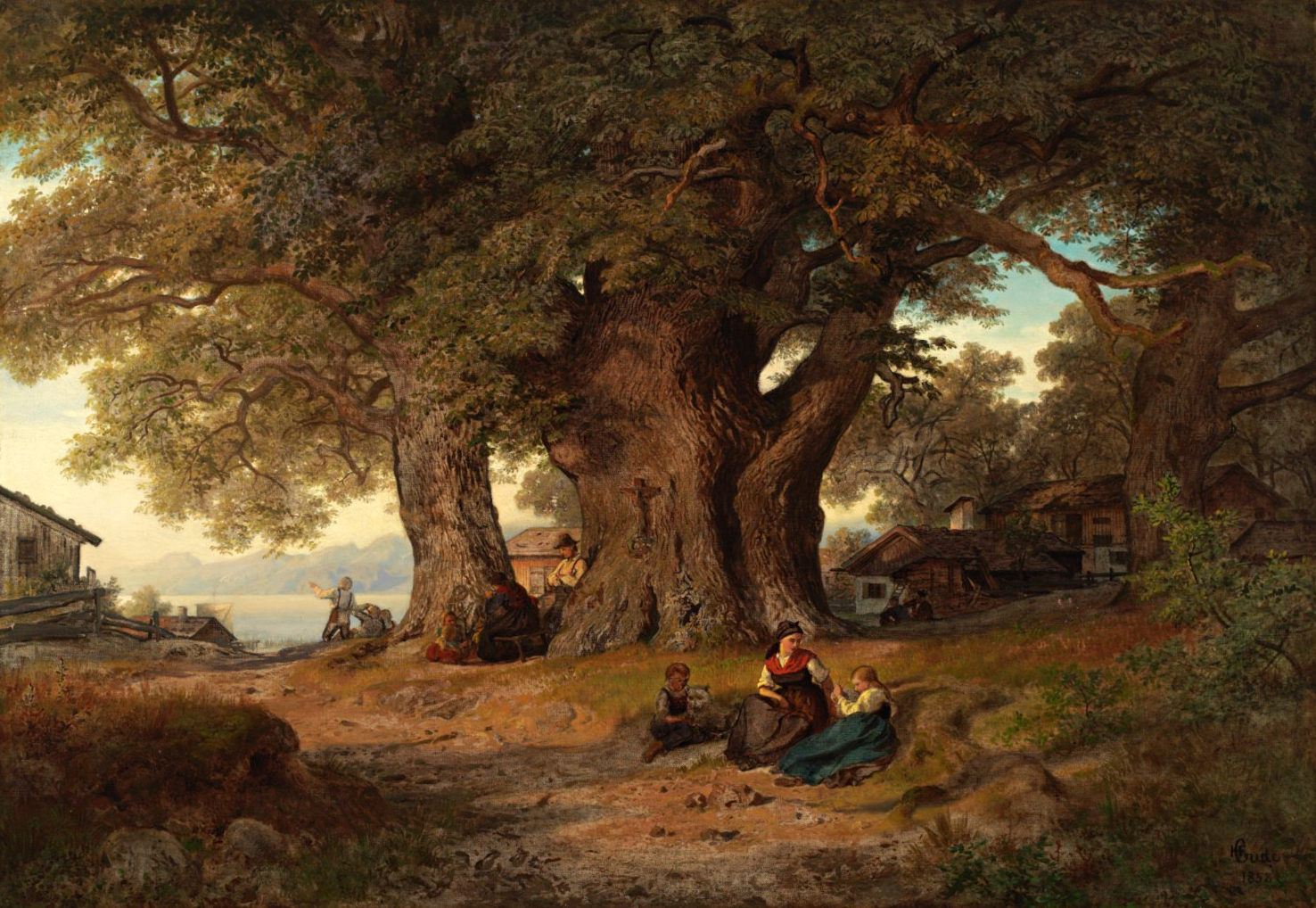
Under eketreet or Under the Oak (1858)

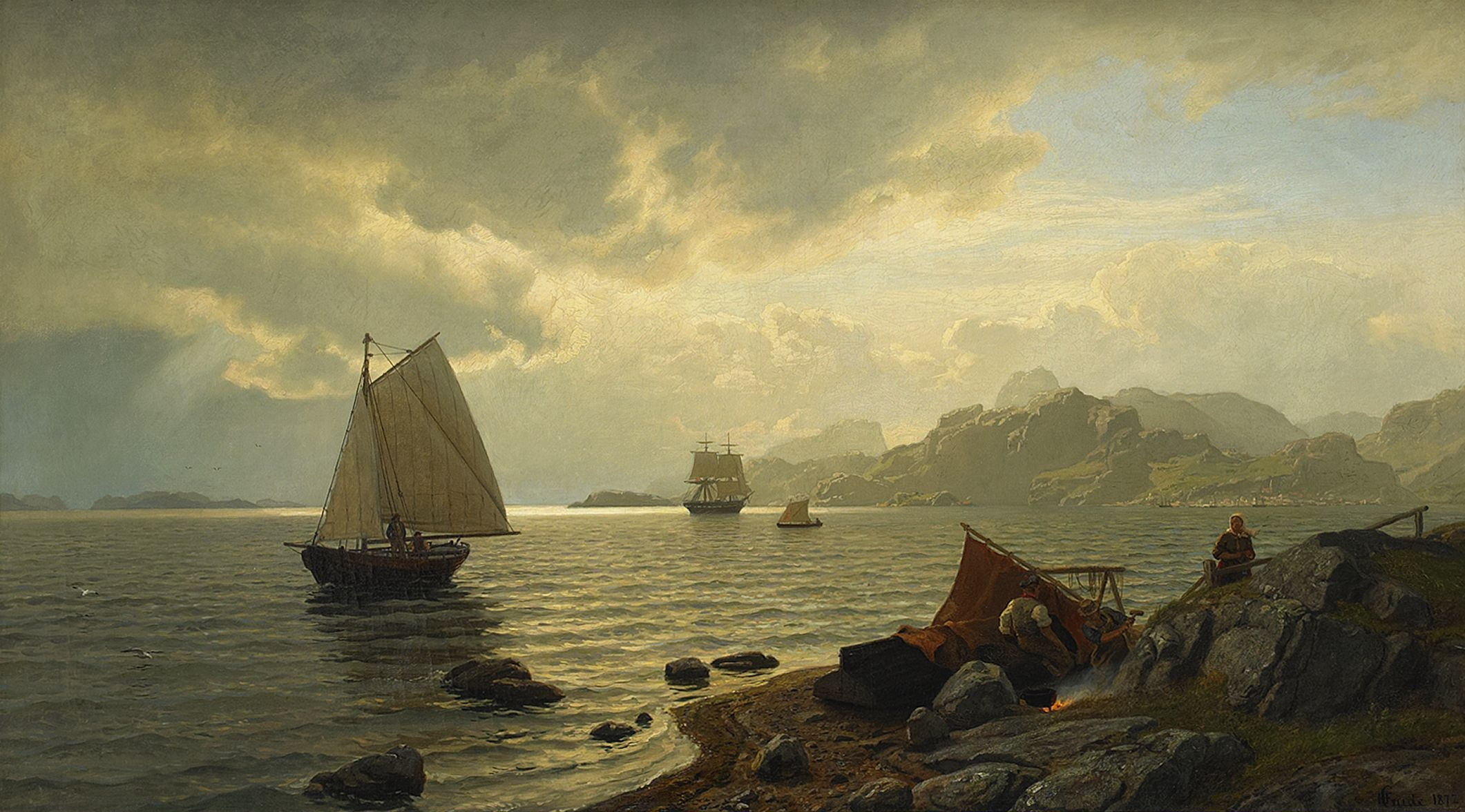
Spinnkusten längs Sörlandskusten (1872)

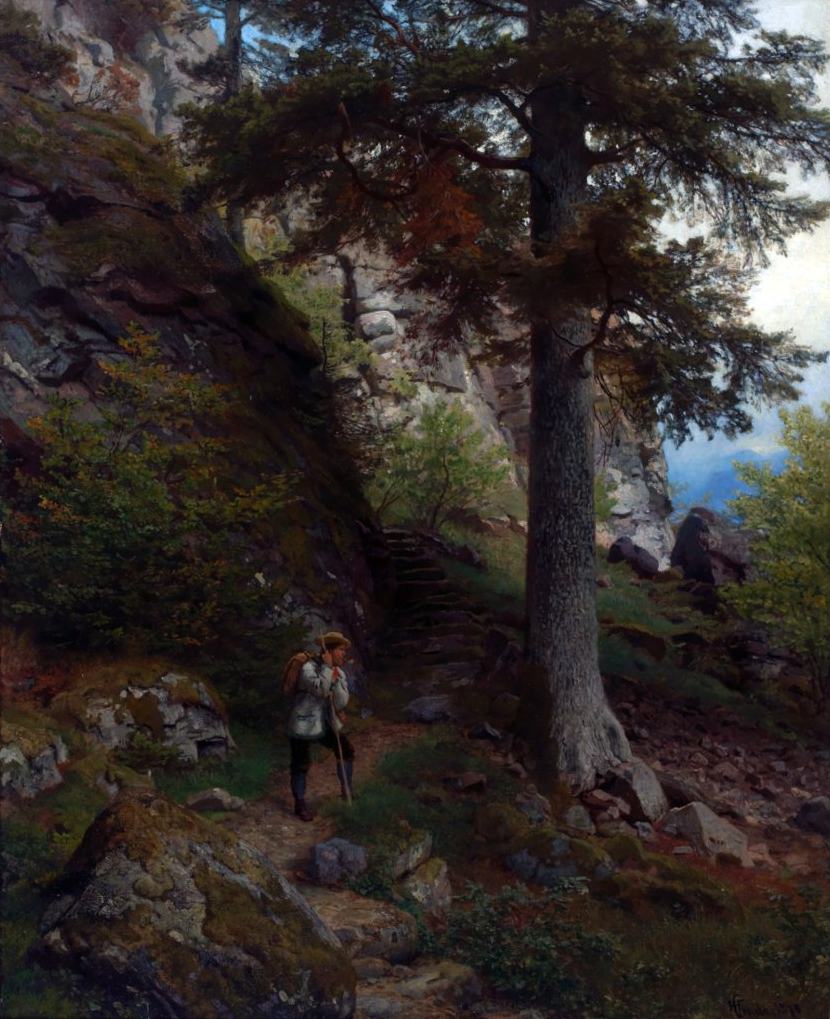
Hvile på stien or Resting on the path (1878)

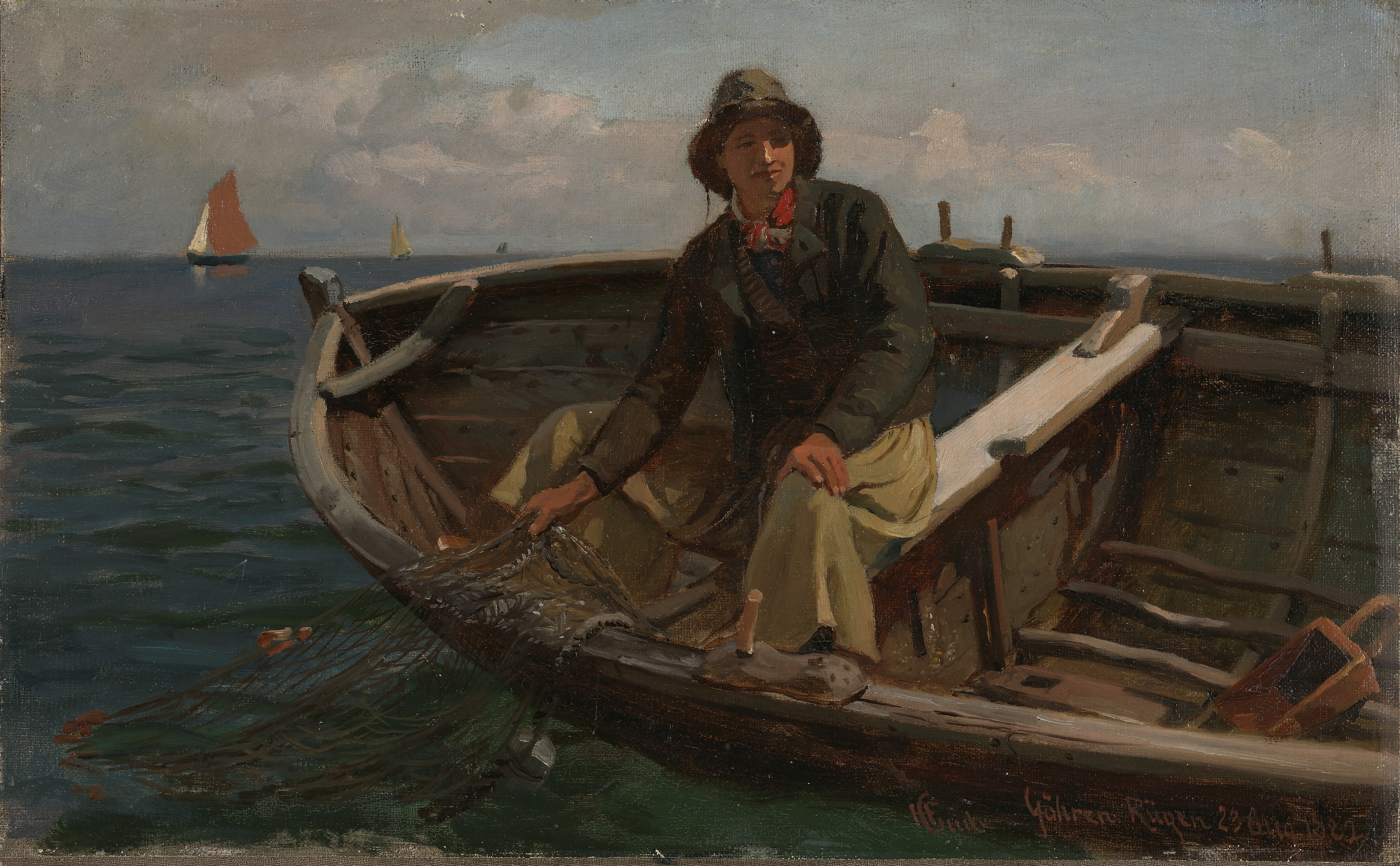
Fisker fra Rügen, or Fishermen from Rügen, (1882).

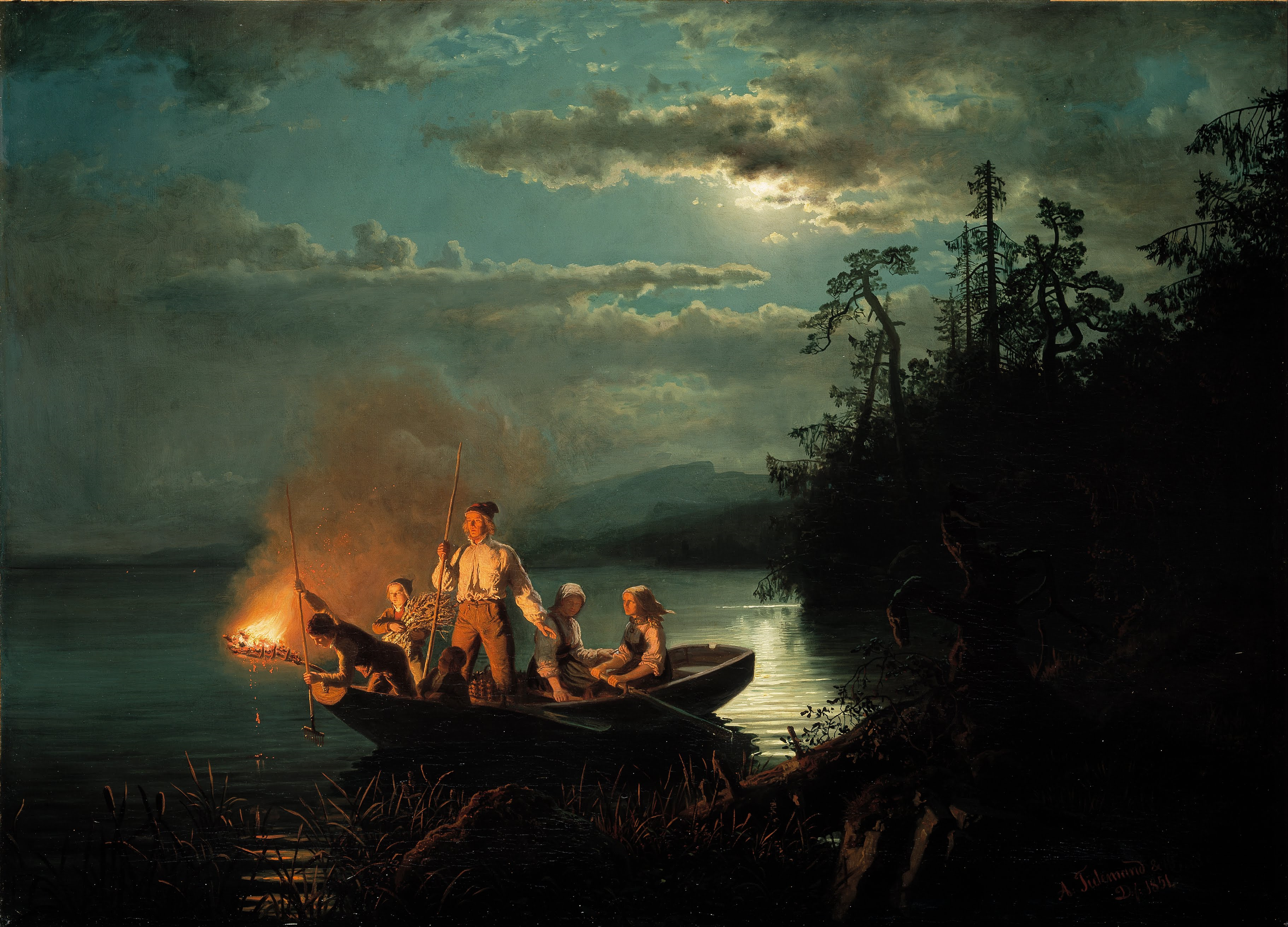
Fishermen Hans Gude and Adolph Tidemand

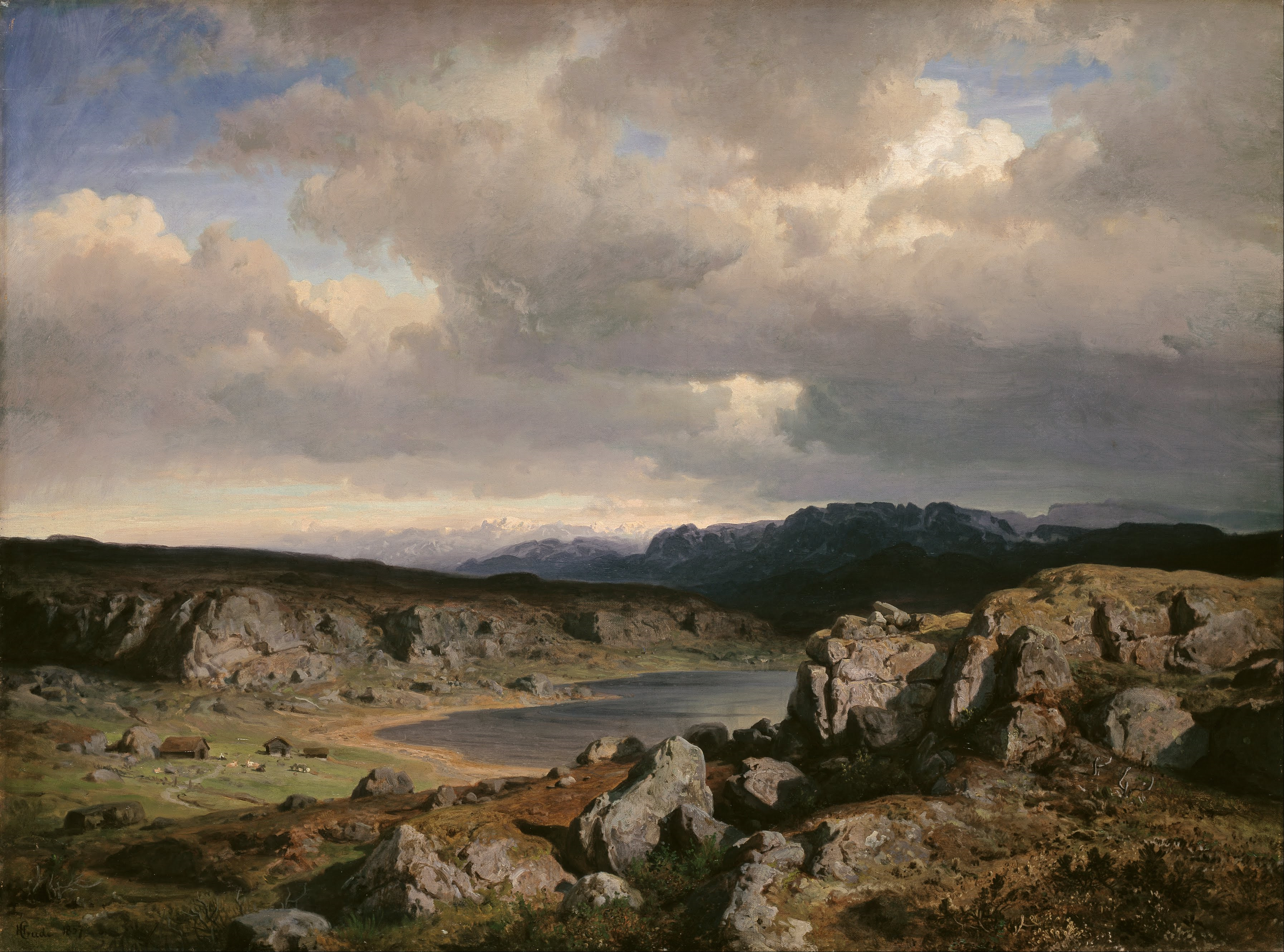
Høifjell, 1857

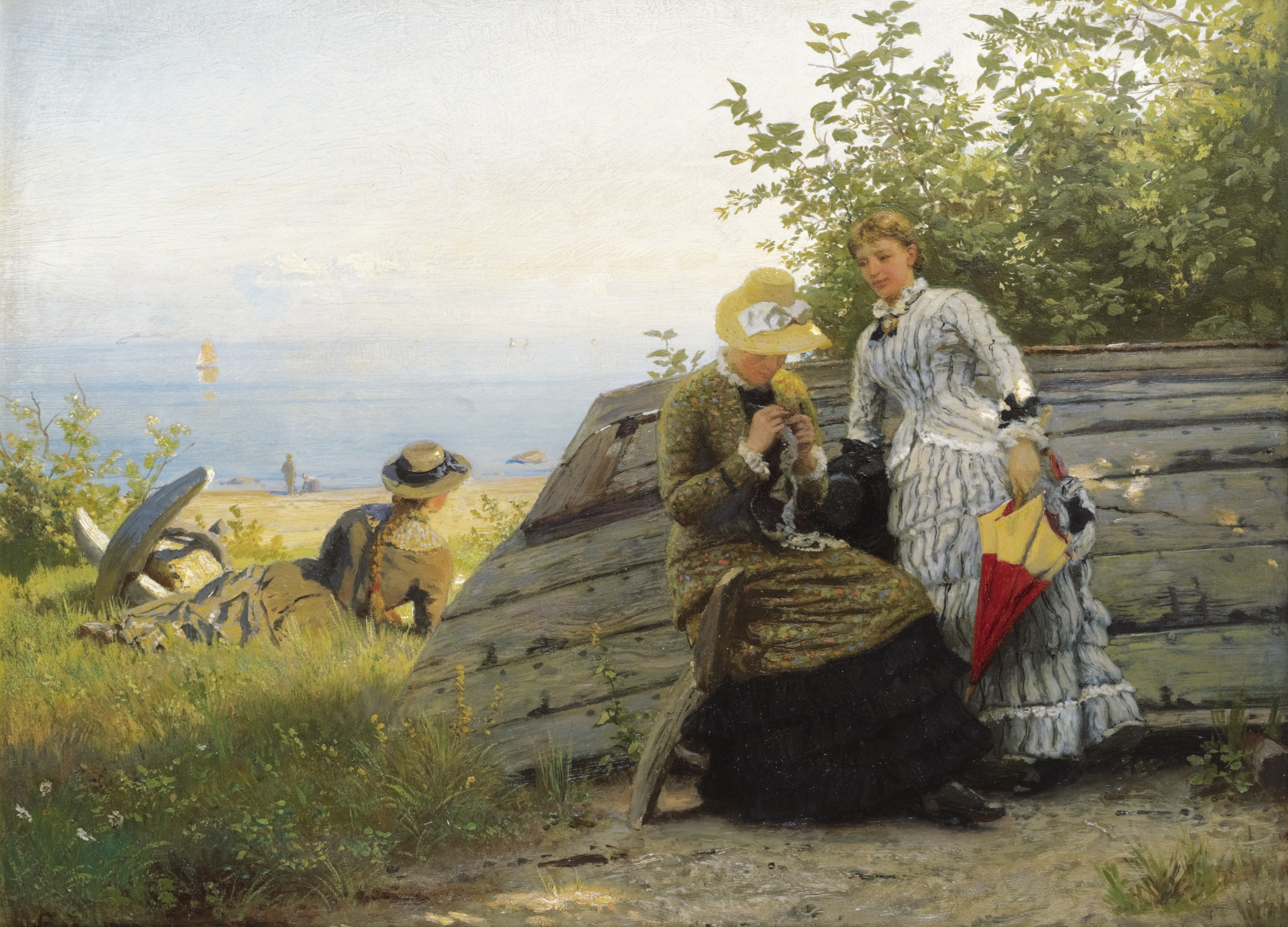
Damer i solskinnet or Ladies in the sunshine (1883)

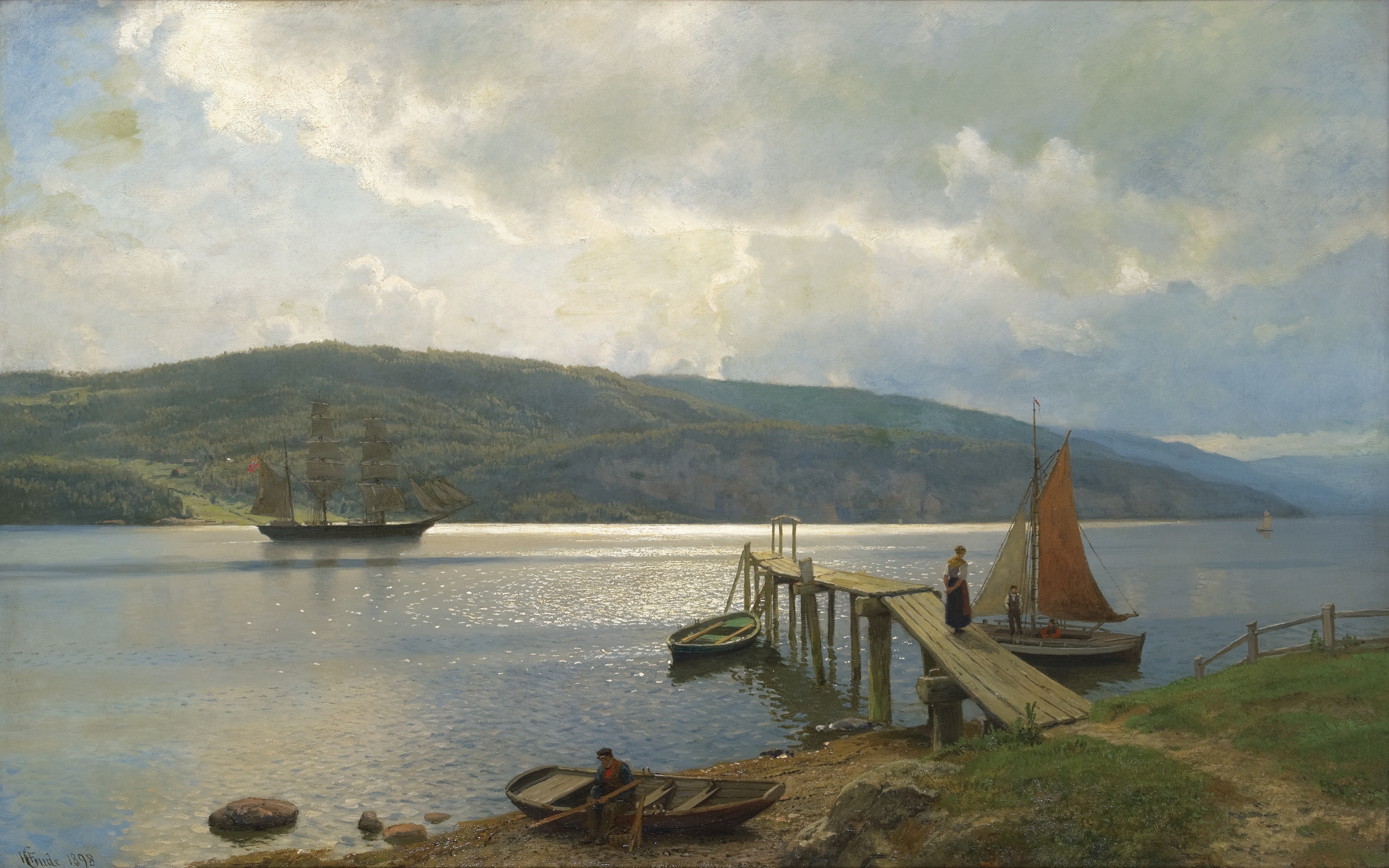
Kaien på Feste i nær Moss (1898)

== Awards and honors ==
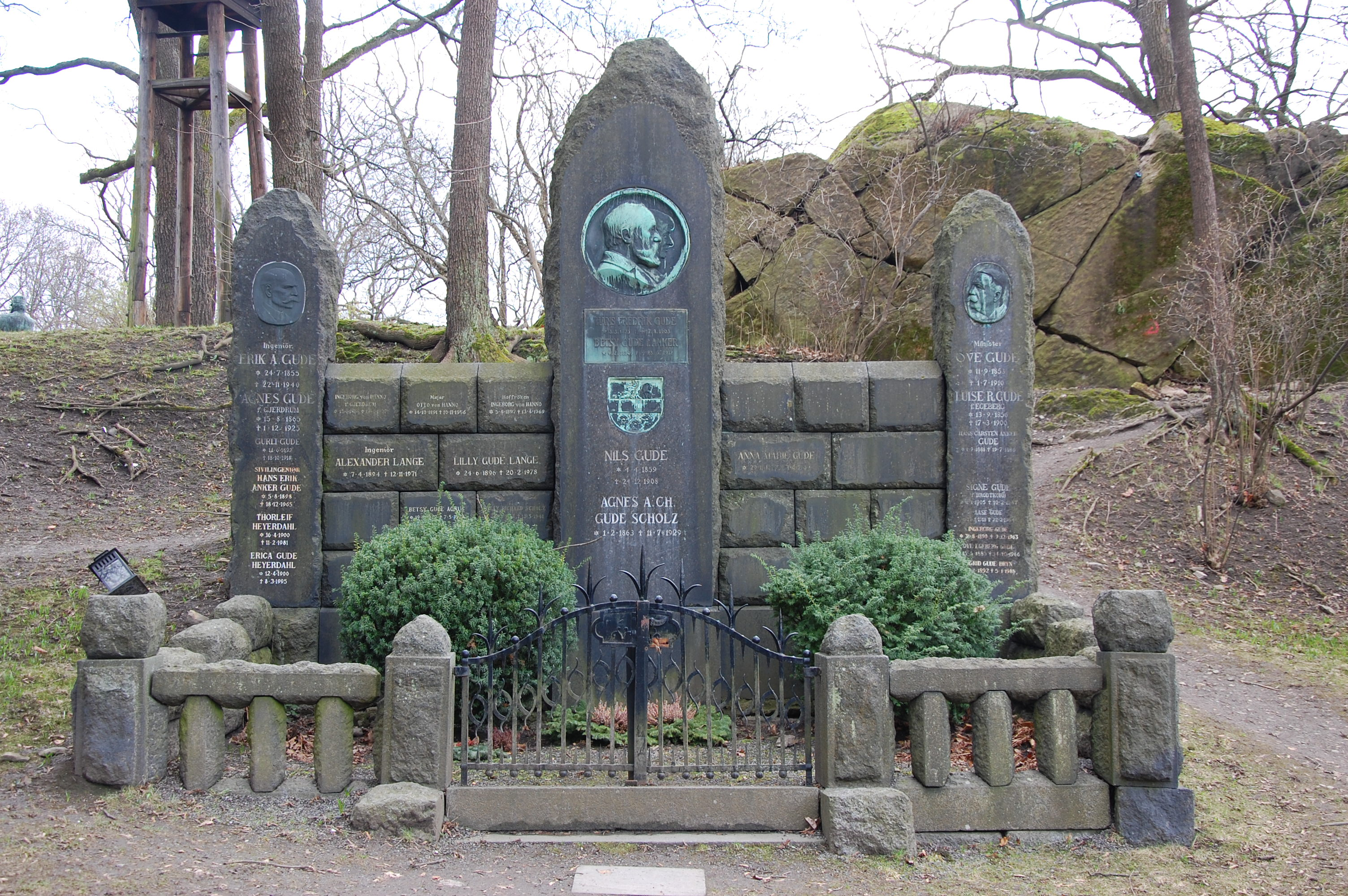
Grave of Hans Gude and family at the honorary burial ground in Vår Frelsers gravlund, Oslo. Among the family members resting there are also Ove Gude and Nils Gude.

- 1852 – Gold medal at Berlin Exhibition
- 1855 – Medal, 2nd class, Paris Exhibition
- 1860 – Gold medal at Berlin Exhibition
- 1861 – Medal, 2nd class, Paris Exhibition
- 1867 – Medal, 2nd class, Paris Exhibition
- 1873 – Gold medal at Vienna Exhibition for Nødhavn Ved Norskekysten
- 1876 – Medal for A Fresh Breeze, Norwegian Coast and Calm, Christianiaford in Philadelphia at United States Centennial Commission International Exhibition
- 1880 – Member of Berlin Academy of Art's Senate
- 1894 – Grand Cross of the Order of St. Olav

Gude was also a member of the Order of the Zähringer Lion, Order of the Red Eagle, and the Order of Franz Joseph.

=== Academy memberships ===
Gude earned membership in the following art academies:

- Amsterdam
- Berlin
- Copenhagen
- Rotterdam
- Stockholm
- Vienna
