= Solberg city government =

City Government of Oslo since 2023

- City Government of Oslo Municipality and County
- Incumbent
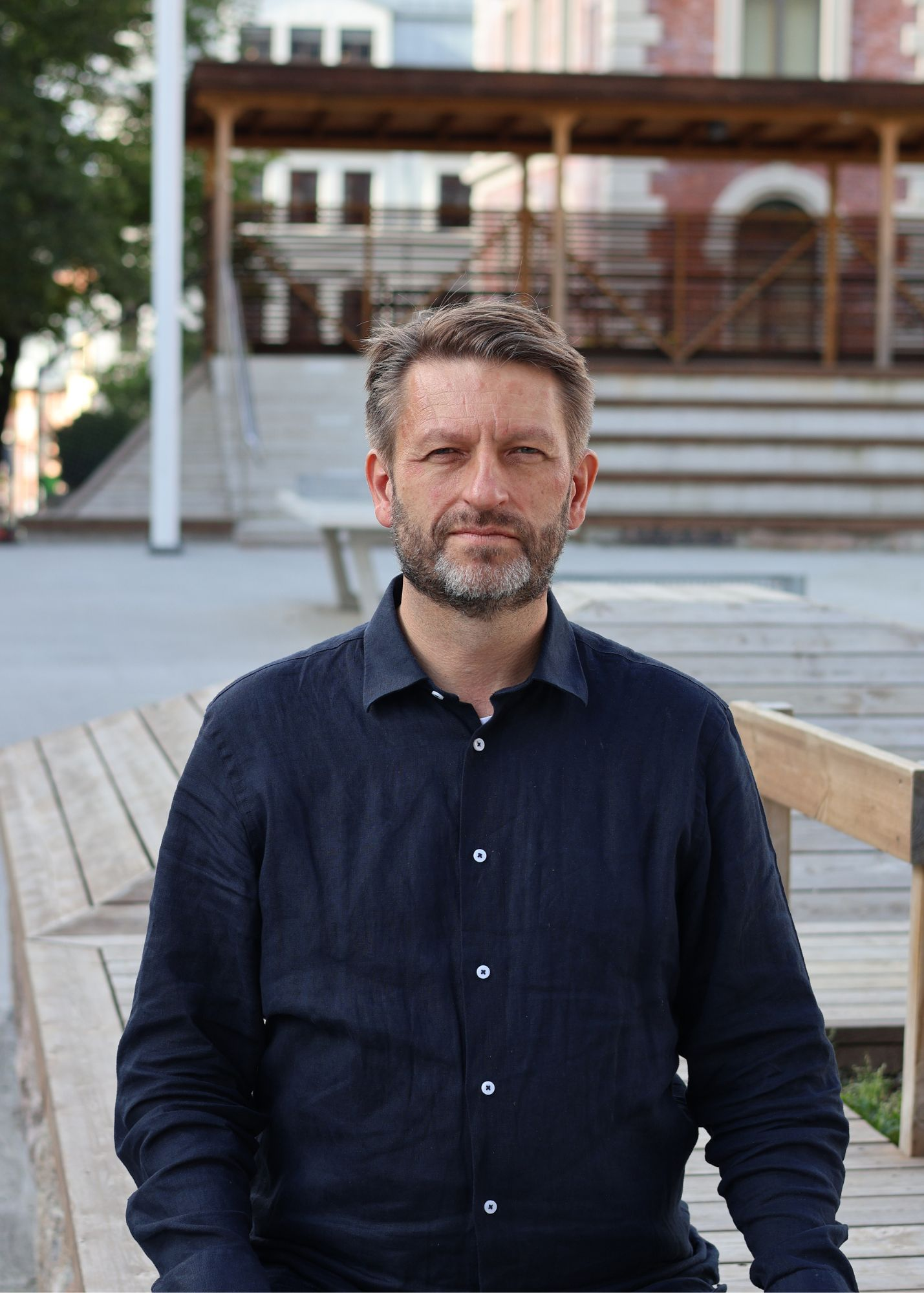
- Date formed: 25 October 2023

People and organisations
- Mayor: Anne Lindboe
- Governing Mayor: Eirik Lae Solberg
- No. of ministers: 8
- Member party: Conservative Party; Liberal Party
- Status in legislature: Coalition minority government (2023–present)

History
- Incoming formation: 2023 local elections
- Election: 2023
- Legislature term: 2023–2027
- Predecessor: Johansen city government

The Solberg city government is the incumbent city government of the Norwegian capital of Oslo, in office since 25 October 2023. It is led by Governing Mayor of Oslo, Eirik Lae Solberg of the Conservative Party, and is a minority coalition consisting of the Conservative and Liberal parties. From 2023 to 2025, it was supported by the Progress Party until they withdrew their support.

== Formation ==
The Conservative-led block won a majority at the 2023 local elections, and the Conservatives initially sought to form a new city government with the Liberal Party, Christian Democrats and the Progress Party, but these negotiations collapsed and the Conservatives then sought to form a minority government with only the Liberal Party. The Progress Party had also ruled out a cooperation agreement with a new city government, citing that they would not support a government they weren't a part of. However, they later backtracked and agreed to negotiate a cooperation agreement with the Conservatives and Liberals. The parties presented their platform on 24 October and Eirik Lae Solberg presented his new government the following day.

=== Withdrawal of support ===
In June 2025, the Progress Party announced that they would withdraw their support for Solberg's government, leaving it in a minority. The party cited the government's lack of action to reverse the previous government's policies within transport, their pace of cutting the property tax and the amount of spending used on road maintenance as their main reasons for withdrawing their support.

== Composition ==
Portfolio	Minister	Took office	Left office	Party	Ref
Governing Mayor of Oslo	Eirik Lae Solberg	25 October 2023	Incumbent	Conservative	
Deputy Governing Mayor	Hallstein Bjercke	25 October 2023	Incumbent	Liberal	
City Commissioner for Finance	Hallstein Bjercke	25 October 2023	Incumbent	Liberal	
City Commissioner for Transport and the Environment	Marit Vea	25 October 2023	Incumbent	Liberal	
City Commissioner for Health	Saliba Andreas Korkunc	25 October 2023	19 June 2026	Conservative	
City Commissioner for Health	Oluf Ulseth	19 June 2026	Incumbent	Conservative	
City Commissioner for Education	Julie Remen Midtgarden	25 October 2023	Incumbent	Conservative	
City Commissioner for Urban Development	James Stove Lorentzen	25 October 2023	10 March 2026	Conservative	
City Commissioner for Urban Development	Anita Leirvik North	10 March 2026	30 October 2026	Conservative	
City Commissioner for Urban Development	Christina Solli Ektvedt	10 November 2026	Incumbent	Conservative	
City Commissioner for Social Services	Julianne Ferskaug	25 October 2023	Incumbent	Liberal	
City Commissioner for Culture and Industry	Anita Leirvik North	25 October 2023	10 March 2026	Conservative	
City Commissioner for Culture and Industry	Mehmet Kaan Inan	10 March 2026	Incumbent	Conservative	
