= Sunniva Holmås Eidsvoll =

Norwegian politician (born 1983)

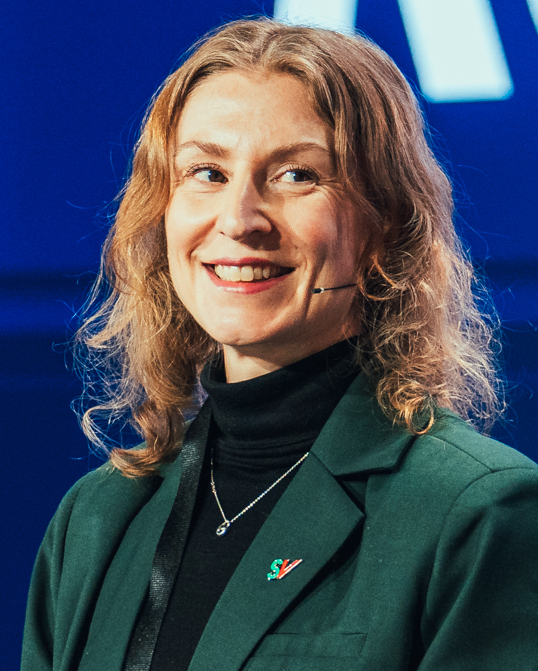
- Eidsvoll in 2025

Member of the Storting
- Incumbent
- Assumed office 1 October 2025
- Constituency: Oslo

Oslo City Commissioner for Education
- In office 19 October 2021 – 25 October 2023
- Governing Mayor: Raymond Johansen
- Preceded by: Inga Marte Thorkildsen
- Succeeded by: Julie Remen Midtgarden

Personal details
- Born: 23 October 1983 (age 42)
- Party: Socialist Left
- Spouse: Heikki Holmås (m. 2012)

Sunniva Holmås Eidsvoll (née Sunniva Pettersen Eidsvoll; born 23 October 1983) is a Norwegian politician who was elected member of the Storting in 2025. She has served as chairwoman of the Socialist Left Party in Oslo since 2017.

== Political career ==
=== Local politics ===
She became leader of the Oslo branch of the Socialist Left Party in 2017. She has been a member of the Oslo Municipal Council since 2015.

On 19 October 2021, she was appointed Oslo City Commissioner for Education, succeeding Inga Marte Thorkildsen who had resigned. She held the position for the remainder of Raymond Johansen's term as Governing Mayor of Oslo and was succeeded by Julie Remen Midtgarden on 25 October 2023 upon the formation of Eirik Lae Solberg's city government.

=== Parliament ===
She was elected as a regular representative to the Storting from Oslo at the 2025 parliamentary election.

== Personal life ==
She married then minister of international development Heikki Holmås in September 2012.
