= Julie Remen Midtgarden =

Norwegian politician (born 1984)

Oslo City Commissioner for Education
- Incumbent
- Assumed office 25 October 2023
- Governing Mayor: Eirik Lae Solberg
- Preceded by: Sunniva Holmås Eidsvoll

Personal details
- Born: 21 April 1984 (age 42) Porsgrunn, Telemark, Norway
- Party: Conservative
- Education: University of Oslo; BI Norwegian Business School

Julie Remen Midtgarden (born 21 April 1984) is a Norwegian politician for the Conservative Party.

== Political career ==
=== Youth politics ===
In 2009 she was hired as secretary-general of the Young Conservatives, the youth wing of the Conservative Party.

=== Government ===
After the Conservative Party managed to form a cabinet in 2013, Remen was eventually appointed as political adviser for government minister Anniken Hauglie in 2016. They served in the Ministry of Education, with Remen following Hauglie when the latter changed ministry to the Ministry of Labour in 2018. Remen left at the end of 2018, only to return to the cabinet, serving as a State Secretary in the Ministry of Education from April 2019 to January 2020.

=== Local politics ===
In 2023 she became City Commissioner (byråd) of Education in the Conservative Party's newly formed city government of Oslo.

== Civic career ==
She entered the PR business as an adviser in Burston-Marsteller. In 2021, Remen and fellow young politician Zaineb Al-Samarai were hired by Petter Stordalen to his PR firm Storm Communications.

== Personal life ==
Born in Porsgrunn, she was the students' leader while attending Porsgrunn Upper Secondary School.

She graduated with a bachelor's degree in political science from the University of Oslo and an executive master of management degree from the BI Norwegian Business School.

Party political offices
Preceded by Sunniva Ihle Steinstad	Secretary-general of the Norwegian Young Conservatives; 2009–2012	Succeeded by Christopher Wand
Political offices
Preceded by Sunniva Holmås Eidsvoll	Oslo City Commissioner of Education; 2023–present	Incumbent
