= Inga Marte Thorkildsen =

Norwegian politician

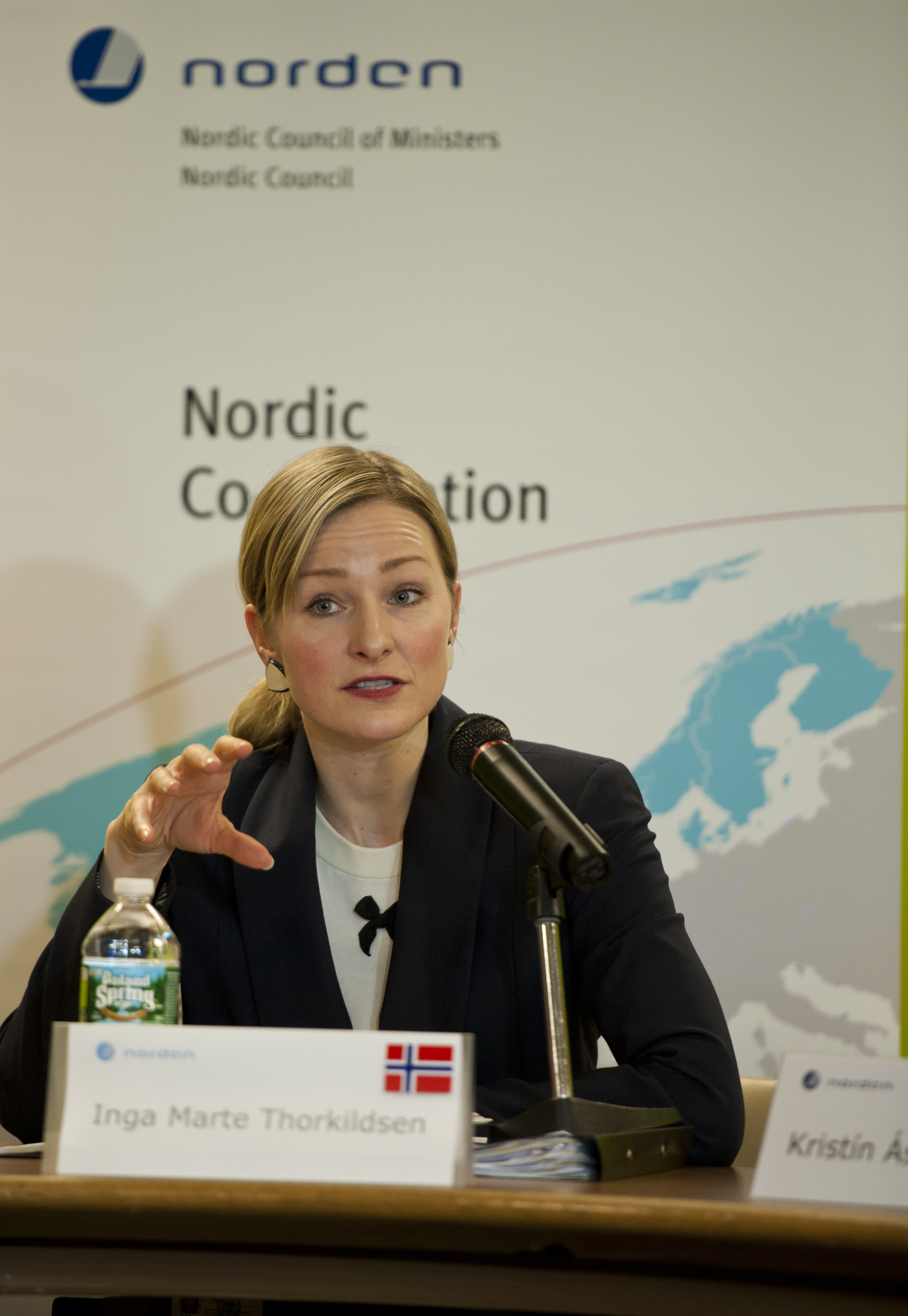

Oslo City Commissioner for Knowledge and Education
- In office 19 December 2017 – 19 October 2021
- Governing Mayor: Raymond Johansen
- Preceded by: Tone Tellevik Dahl
- Succeeded by: Sunniva Holmås Eidsvoll

Oslo City Commissioner for the Elderly, Health and Labour
- In office 21 October 2015 – 19 December 2017
- Governing Mayor: Raymond Johansen
- Preceded by: Aud Kvalbein
- Succeeded by: Tone Tellevik Dahl

Minister of Children and Equality
- In office 23 March 2012 – 16 October 2013
- Prime Minister: Jens Stoltenberg
- Preceded by: Audun Lysbakken
- Succeeded by: Solveig Horne

Member of the Norwegian Parliament
- In office 1 October 2001 – 30 September 2013
- Deputy: Lars Egeland
- Constituency: Vestfold

Deputy Leader of the Socialist Left Party
- In office 11 March 2012 – 14 March 2015
- Leader: Audun Lysbakken
- Preceded by: Audun Lysbakken
- Succeeded by: Oddny Irene Miljeteig

Personal details
- Born: 2 July 1976 (age 50) Stokke Municipality, Vestfold, Norway
- Party: Socialist Left
- Spouse: Lars Kolltveit

Inga Marte Thorkildsen (born 2 July 1976) is a Norwegian politician for the Socialist Left Party (SV). She served as Minister of Children and Equality from 2012 to 2013.

== Career ==
Growing up in Stokke Municipality, she was elected to the Norwegian Parliament representing Vestfold in 2001. She served as Minister of Children, Equality and Social Inclusion from 2012 to 2013 when Stoltenberg's cabinet resigned. She lost her seat in the 2013 election.

Thorkildsen went on to serve in the Oslo city council cabinet following the 2015 local election. She first served as commissioner for the elderly, health and labour from 2015 to 2017, before being appointed commissioner for knowledge and education. She resigned her position on 19 October 2021, citing that she wanted to take a break and figure out what she wanted to do next.

She received the Rights Prize (Rettighetsprisen) in 2018 for her work combating domestic violence.

On 15 February 2022, Thorkildsen asked the city council to take leave, stating that she was expecting to leave politics for good.
