= Geir Arild Espnes =

Norwegian politician (born 1957)

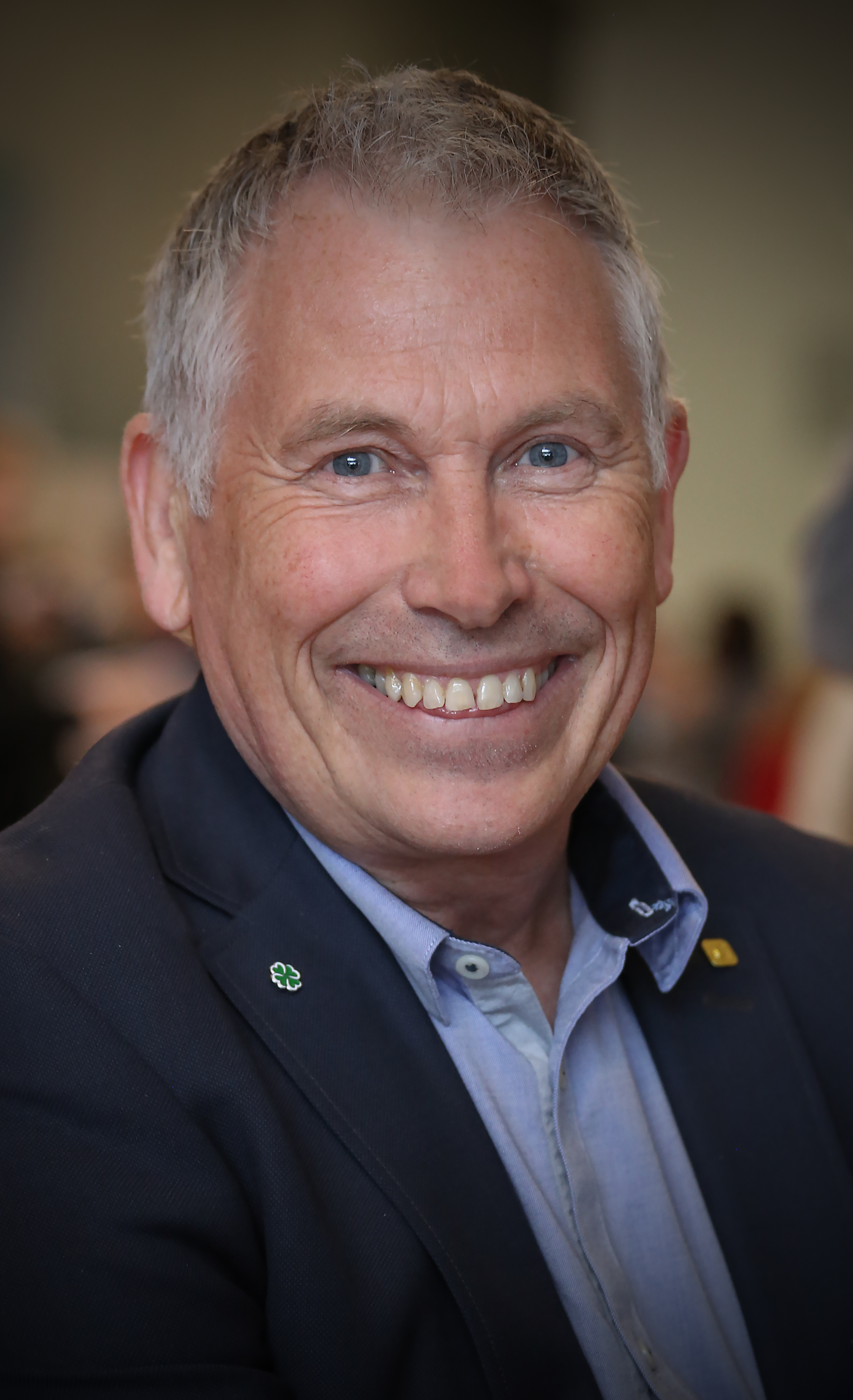
Geir Arild Espnes in 2017

Geir Arild Espnes (born 23 November 1957) is a Norwegian public health scientist and politician for the Centre Party.

He was elected as a deputy representative to the Parliament of Norway from Sør-Trøndelag for the terms 2017–2021 and 2021–2025. In 2019 he became mayor of Oppdal Municipality. He announced that he would be stepping down from being a Mayor, wanting to go back to University, before the 2023 Norwegian local elections.

Espnes is a professor of public health science at the Norwegian University of Science and Technology and leads the Center for Health Promotion Research.
