= Torger =

Torge and Torger is a masculine given name.

== Torge ==
- Torge Hollmann (born 1982), German footballer
- Torge Schmidt (born 1988), German politician
- Torge Paetow (born 1995), German footballer

== Torger ==
- Torger Christian Wolff (born 1972), Austrian billionaire motorsport executive
- Torger Reve (born 1949), Norwegian economist
- Torger Juve (1840–?), Norwegian-born American politician
- Torger Ødegaard (born 1966), Norwegian politician
- Torger Baardseth(1875–1947), Norwegian bookseller and publisher
- Torger Hovi (1905–1980), Norwegian politician
- Torger Nergård (born 1974), Norwegian curler
- Torger G. Thompson (1853–1923), American politician
- Torger Motland (born 1985), Norwegian football striker
- Torger Holtsmark (1863–1926), Norwegian farmer and politician
- Torger Tokle (1919–1945), Norwegian-born American ski jumper and military officer
- Torger Hougen, American musician

== See also ==
- Torg
