= Ole Mathias Rønaasen =

Norwegian politician (born 1977)

Ole Mathias Rønaasen (born 27 November 1992) is a Norwegian farmer and politician for the Centre Party.

He worked as party secretary for the Centre Party in Hedmark until 2019.

After stepping down as party secretary in 2019, Rønaasen became the general manager of Grue Bygdeservice, a firm offering agricultural and construction services in the local community. He later transitioned to the role of chair of the board, continuing his involvement in the company's strategic development.

In 2022 he took over the family farm, growing crops of potatoes.

He was elected as a deputy representative to the Parliament of Norway from Hedmark for the term 2021–2025. In 2022 he was nominated in second place on the Centre Party ballot for the 2023 Norwegian local elections in Innlandet, being elected to the county council.
