= Michael Tetzschner =

Norwegian politician

Michael von Tetzschner
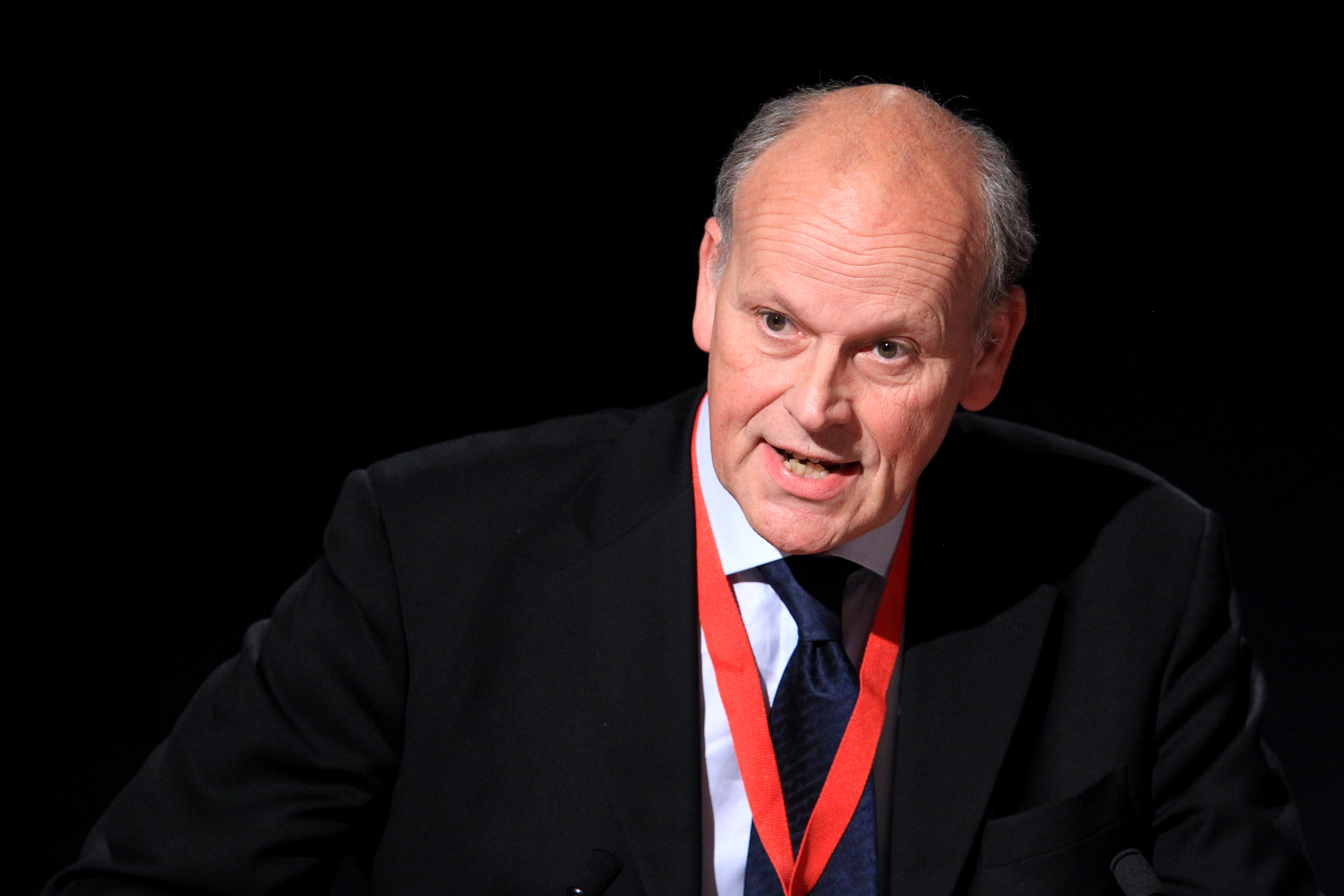
- Tetzschner in 2010

Leader of the Oslo Conservatives
- In office 21 January 2006 – 28 January 2012
- Preceded by: Heidi Larssen
- Succeeded by: Nikolai Astrup

Member of the Norwegian Parliament
- In office 1 October 2009 – 30 September 2021
- Constituency: Oslo

2nd Governing Mayor of Oslo
- In office 1 March 1989 – 1 January 1992
- Mayor: Albert Nordengen; Peter N. Myhre
- Preceded by: Hans Svelland
- Succeeded by: Rune Gerhardsen

Oslo City Commissioner of Finance
- In office 1 January 1988 – 1 March 1989
- Governing Mayor: Hans Svelland
- Preceded by: Hans Svelland
- Succeeded by: Merete Johnson

Oslo City Commissioner of Urban Development
- In office 5 February 1986 – 1 January 1988
- Governing Mayor: Hans Svelland
- Preceded by: Position established
- Succeeded by: Sigurd Østen

Personal details
- Born: Michael Christian von Tetzschner; 9 February 1954 (age 72) Copenhagen, Denmark
- Party: Conservative
- Spouse: Kristin Clemet
- Children: 4
- Occupation: Politician

Michael Christian von Tetzschner (born 9 February 1954 in Copenhagen, Denmark), commonly known as Michael Tetzschner, is a Norwegian politician for the Conservative Party. He is the President of the Nordic Council during 2018.

Tetzschner was Governing Mayor of Oslo from 1989 to 1992. He was elected to the Norwegian Parliament from Oslo in 2009.

He grew up in Copenhagen in Denmark until he was eight years old, when he moved to his grandparents in Oslo. He lives with politician Kristin Clemet.

Political offices
Preceded by Hans Svelland	Governing Mayor of Oslo; 1989–1992	Succeeded by Rune Gerhardsen
