= Cliff Moustache =

Seychellois-Norwegian film director, actor, and playwright

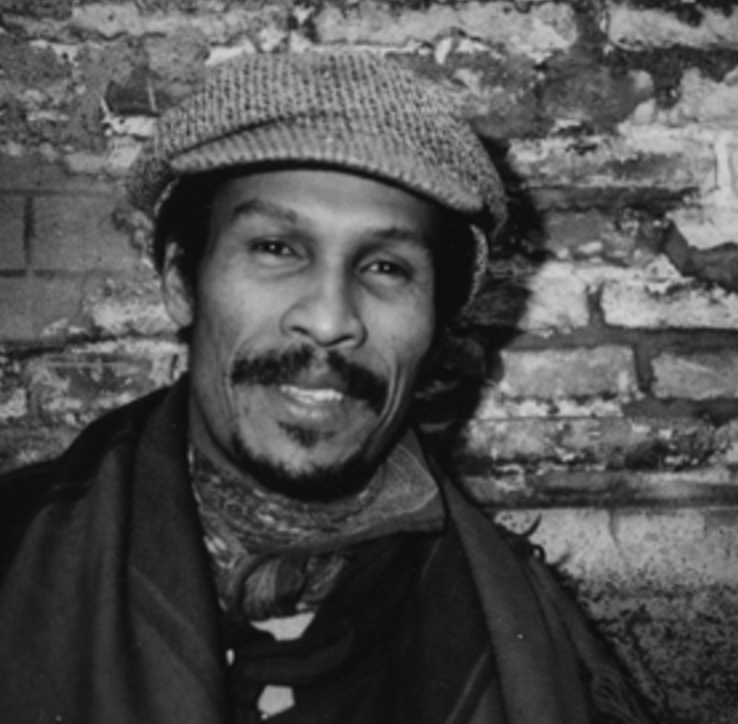
- Born: November 9, 1952 (age 73)
- Education: University of Bergen
- Occupations: Film director, playwright, actor, theatre director
- Years active: 1979-present
- Awards: artist of the year 2019

Cliff A. Moustache (born 9 November 1952) is a Seychellois-Norwegian film director, actor, and playwright.

== Biography ==
Moustache was born in the island nation of Seychelles. From a young age, he was interested in different forms of media and art. His mother wanted him to become a priest, and while he was not interested in this, he did serve as an altar boy in his youth. After completing his education in Seychelles, Moustache studied acting and directing in Dorset, England, graduating in 1979.

After his graduation, Moustache resolved not to return to Seychelles and instead pursue opportunities in Europe. A friend of his, who was a Seychellois sailor, invited him to meet in Norway. Moustache ended up in the wrong city and missed his friend, who had left for Denmark. He ended up performing street theater before landing a job in a restaurant. Moustache enrolled in a Norwegian language course at the University of Bergen and eventually acquired Norwegian citizenship. In 1981, he moved to Oslo, where he worked with the state media for a short period before writing his own theater productions. He wrote and directed Vestvind/Vestvind in 1986. From 1989 to 1991, Moustache was a director for Artists for Liberation.

In 1992, Moustache opened Nordic Black Theatre in Oslo, together with Jarl Solberg. Both continue to have a role in the theatre, with Moustache serving as the artistic director while Solberg is the general manager. The theatre is self-funded and produces its own shows, as well as taking part in collaborative projects with outside artists. In 1993, he established the theatre school Nordic Black Xpress to develop young talent in the arts. Nordic Black Xpress offers two-year courses to 8-12 students, who study for eight to nine hours, five to six days a week. Moustache is attempting to establish the school within the university system so it can grant three-year bachelor's degrees.

Moustache directed his first short film Radio Knockout in 2000. It won awards at festivals in Scotland, England, Portugal and North America. Since then, he has directed many short films and documentaries. In 2019, Mayor of Oslo Marianne Borgen awarded Moustache the Artist of the Year honor due to his contributions towards Norwegian society and the entertainment industry, becoming the first foreigner to win the award. He lectured at the University of Miami in 2019 and also had a lecture series in Vietnam. In March 2020, he directed the play After the Dream about the life of Martin Luther King Jr., which premiered at the Oslo Opera House.
