= Rune Krutå =

Norwegian politician

Rune Krutå (born 25 February 1981) is a Norwegian politician for the Labour Party.

He served as a deputy representative to the Parliament of Norway from Nordland during the terms 2021–2025 and 2025–2029. After the 2023 Norwegian local elections, Krutå assumed the mayor position in Vefsn. In 2026, he was summoned to Parliament to deputize for one of Labour's MPs, for a total of five weeks.
