= Sverre Valen =

Norwegian choir conductor (1925–2023)

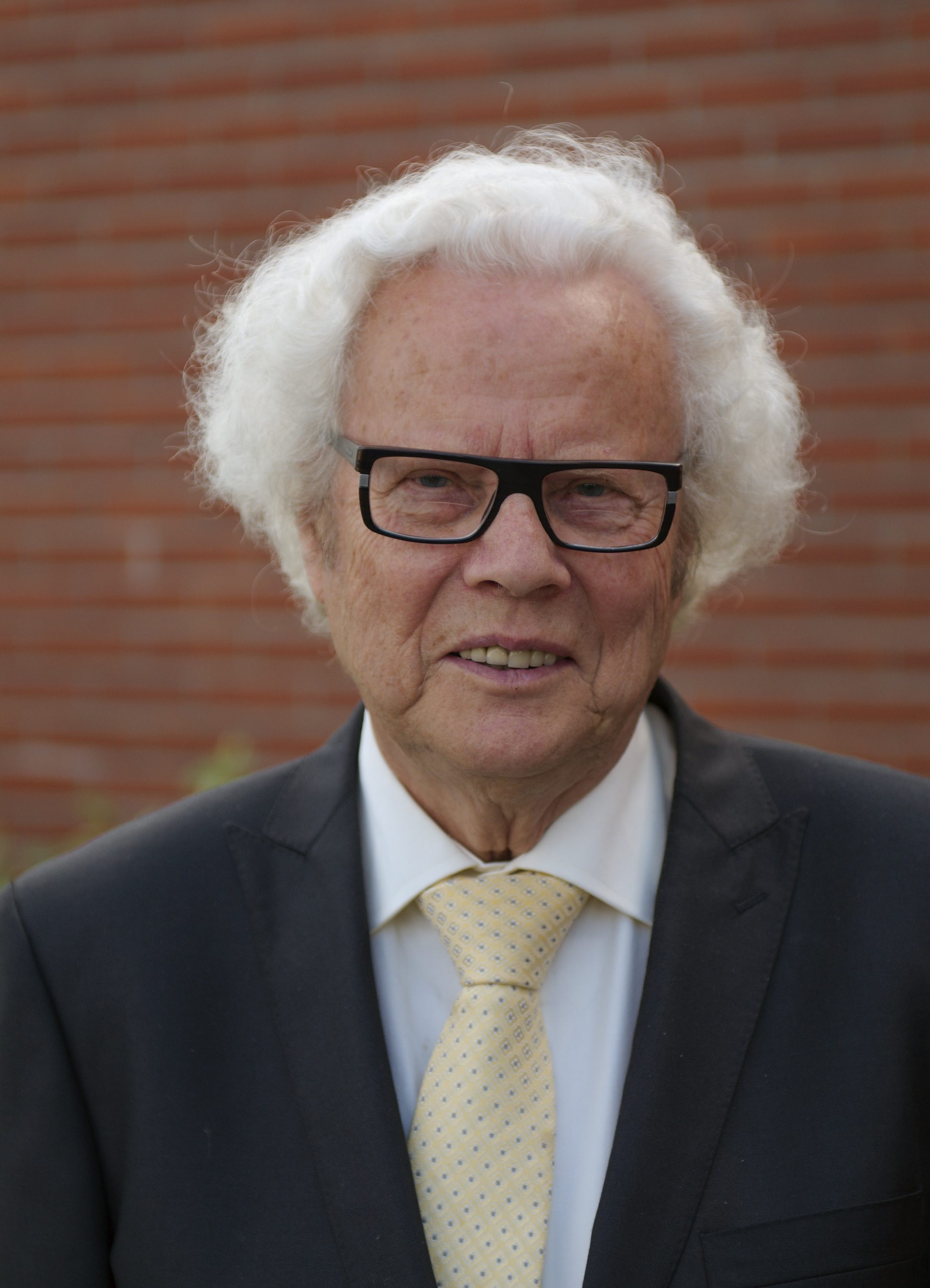
- Valen in 2009

Background information
- Born: 9 May 1925; Levanger, Norway
- Died: 18 March 2023 (aged 97)
- Occupation: Choir conductor

Sverre Valen (9 May 1925 – 18 March 2023) was a Norwegian choir conductor. He founded and directed Sandefjord Girls Choir (Sandefjord Jentekor), Bel Canto-koret, the Valen Choir (Valen-koret) and Valens Solistensemble, many of which have won awards and toured internationally. He became Knight, First Class of the Order of St. Olav in 1992.

== Early life and education ==
Born in Levanger in Nord-Trøndelag county in Norway. He was born to a father who worked as an Adventist pastor, the family would move several times during Valen's upbringing. He got a varied musical education in his youth, playing the piano, various other instruments, and taking singing lessons for four years. He went on to study at the Norwegian Academy of Music.

== Career as choir conductor ==
Valen married song instructor Mary Johannessen in 1952. In 1956, the couple moved to Sandefjord where they started Sandefjord Girls Choir. In 1969, the choir won its class in the BBC (later EBU) competition Let the Peoples Sing. They won NRK's national competition for youth choirs 15 times. On tours in Europe, the choir performed in cathedrals like Cologne Cathedral, Notre-Dame de Paris and St. Peter's Basilica. In 1976, the choir toured the US for three weeks as part of the United States Bicentennial. The tour ended with a performance in Carnegie Hall, for which they received an excellent review in The New York Times. Valen stopped conducting the choir in 1997.

Recruiting many of the best singers of the Sandefjord Girls Choir, he started Valen's Soloist Ensemble (Valens Solistensemble) in 1985 and conducted it until 2000.

In 1961, Valen founded the women's choir Bel Canto which he conducted for ten years.

Valen founded the Valen Choir (Valen-koret) for mixed voices in 1964 and conducted the choir to 1995. The choir had a mixed repertoire, including both sacred and secular choir traditions from various time periods. In 1974, the choir was awarded Spellemannprisen for best recording of the year in classical music.

The last choir Valen conducted was Adventistsangerne, a choir representing the Adventist community in Norway which he started in 1984. Aged 88, he held his last concert with the choir in Norderhov Church on 8 June 2013.

Valen died on 18 March 2023, at the age of 97.

== Awards ==
- Sandefjord city's Cultural Award (1972)
- Vestfold county Cultural Award (1975)
- St. Olav's Medal (1981)
- Knight, First Class of the Order of St. Olav (1992)
- Honorary member of the Association of Norwegian Choir Conductors (1995)
- Sandefjord inhabitant of the century, class for culture (1999)

== Selected recordings ==
- Jul med Sandefjord Jentekor (1970). With Sandefjord Girls' Choir.
- Jul (1980). With the Valen Choir.
- Grieg i våre hjerter (1993). With Valen's Soloist Ensemble.
- Lovsang under kirkehvelv (1999). With Adventsangerne.
