= Torger Ødegaard =

Norwegian politician (born 1966)

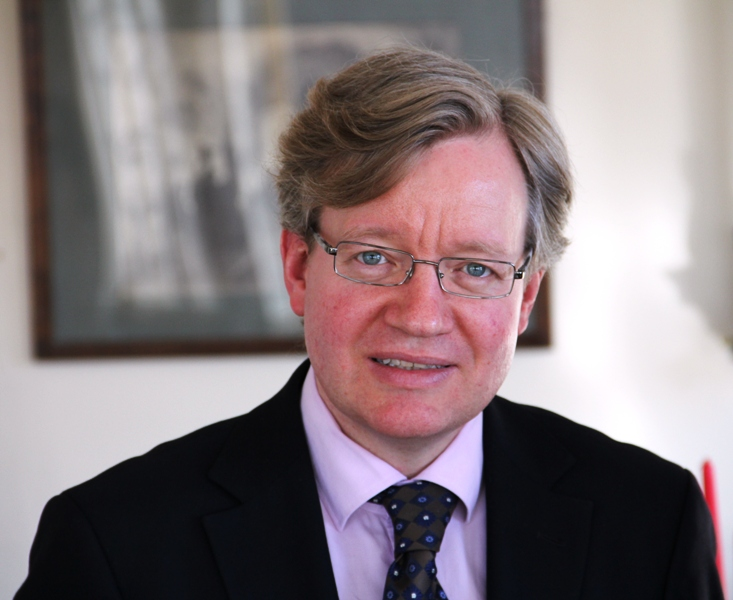
Torger Ødegaard

Torger Ødegaard (born 5 December 1966) is a Norwegian politician for the Conservative Party.

He holds a cand.mag. degree from the University of Oslo. He has worked as director of information in Stor-Oslo Lokaltrafikk, and as a secretary for city government leader Fritz Huitfeldt. From 2001 he was Commissioner (byråd) of Culture and Education in the city government of Oslo. He resigned in 2014 to become managing director of the Lovisenberg Hospital.

Political offices
Preceded by Bård Folke Fredriksen	Oslo City Commissioner of Senior Citizens and the Boroughs; 2001–2002	Succeeded by position abolished
Preceded by position created	Oslo City Commissioner of Welfare and Social Services; 2002–2003	Succeeded by Margaret Eckbo
Preceded by Kjell Veivåg	Oslo City Commissioner of Children and Education; 2003–2013	Succeeded by Anniken Hauglie
Preceded by Kristin Vinje	Oslo City Commissioner of Finance; 2013–2014	Succeeded by Hallstein Bjercke (acting)
