= Anne Lindboe =

Mayor of Oslo since 2023

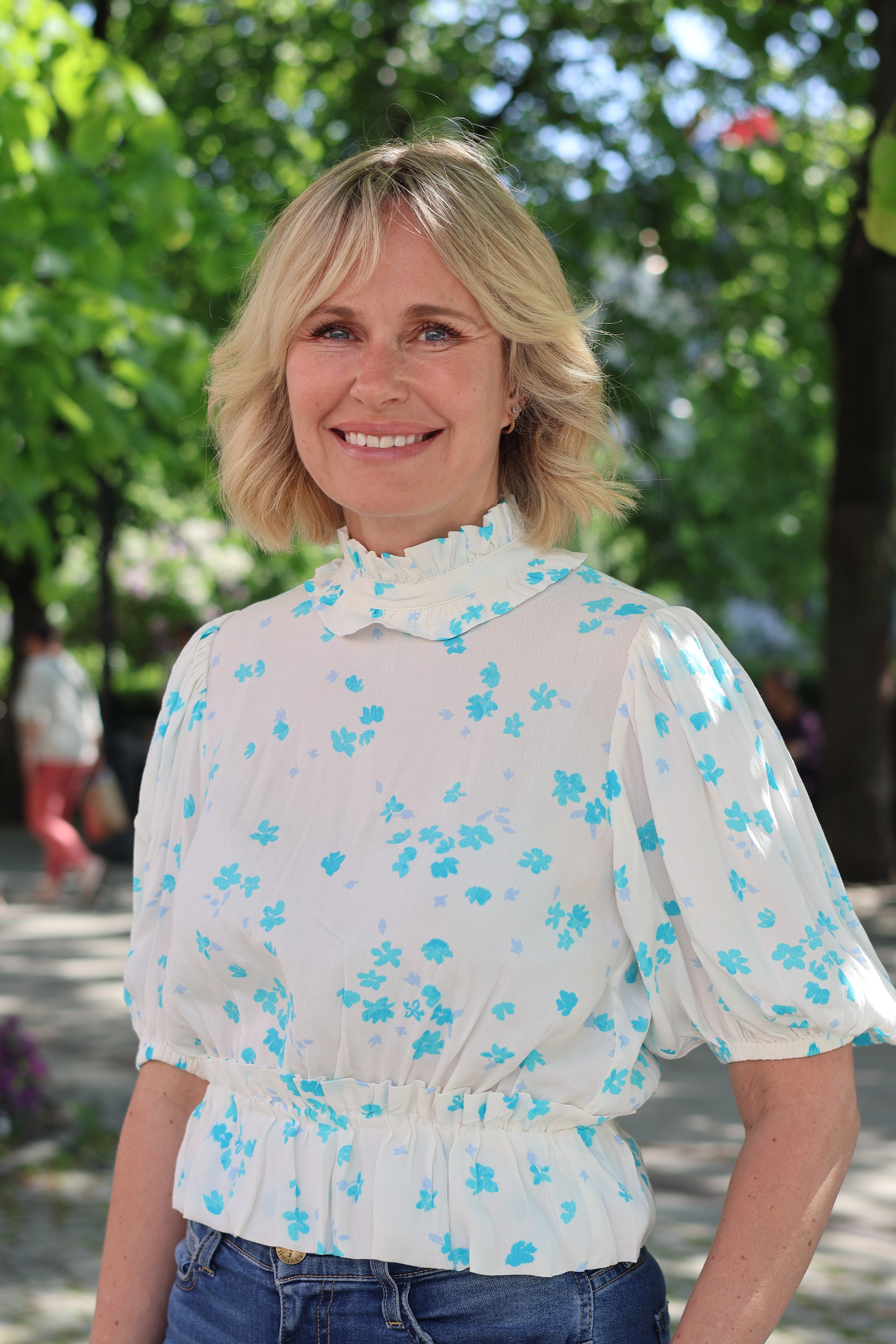
- Lindboe in 2023

Mayor of Oslo
- Incumbent
- Assumed office 25 October 2023
- Deputy: Julianne Ofstad
- Governing Mayor: Eirik Lae Solberg
- Preceded by: Marianne Borgen

Children's Ombudsman of Norway
- In office 1 June 2012 – 30 June 2018
- Preceded by: Reidar Hjermann
- Succeeded by: Inga Bejer Engh

Personal details
- Born: 1 August 1971 (age 55) Sarpsborg, Østfold, Norway
- Party: Conservative
- Children: 3
- Profession: Paediatrician

Anne Lindboe (born 1 August 1971) is a Norwegian politician and paediatrician, who is currently serving as the mayor of Oslo since 2023. She previously served as the Norwegian Children's Ombudsman from 2012 to 2018.

== Early life, education and medical career ==
Anne Lindboe grew up in Revetal, Vestfold. Her parents were teachers. As a young girl she sang in the Sandefjord Jentekor.

She obtained the cand.med. (MD) degree at the University of Oslo in 2000, and also holds an MBA in Management from the Norwegian School of Economics. She was approved as a specialist in paediatrics in 2011.

From 2008 to 2011, she was a consultant at Statens Barnehus Oslo, and from 2010 also a researcher at the Norwegian Institute of Public Health. She worked as an intern at Bærum Hospital 2001–2002 and as an assistant physician at Drammen Hospital 2002–2003 and Ullevål University Hospital 2004–2007. In 2010, she admitted to the PhD programme at the University of Oslo, but has not completed a doctorate.

== Political career ==
=== Mayor of Oslo ===
In July 2022, she was nominated as the Oslo Conservatives' mayoral candidate for the 2023 local elections. Following the election which resulted in a Conservative victory, Lindboe became mayor on 25 October, with the Progress Party's Julianne Ofstad as deputy mayor.

== Children's Ombudsman ==
She has compared long time child custody conflicts to child neglect, and has suggested that mediation between parents should be mandatory before such cases are brought in for court.

In the summer of 2012, she was interviewed for Vårt Land, where she proposed that religious male circumcision be replaced with a symbolic ritual. Invited in Helsinki at the NOCIRC & Sexpo symposium on 2 October 2012, Lindboe confirmed that she was approached by the Simon Wiesenthal Centre, but upheld her view that traditional male circumcision should be banned. In 2013, Lindboe and the children's ombudsmen from Sweden, Finland, Denmark and Iceland along with the Chair of the Danish Children's Council and the children's spokesperson for Greenland passed a resolution to "Let boys decide for themselves whether they want to be circumcised." They further declared that "Circumcision without a medical indication on a person unable to provide informed consent conflicts with basic principles of medical ethics."

After her departure in 2018, she became the chair of the National Association of Private Kindergartens. She resigned her position on 3 January 2022 with immediate effect.

== Personal life ==
Anne Lindboe has three children. The family lives in Ullevål Hageby, Oslo. In June 2026, Lindboe announced her engagement to Pål Sandvid following a five-year relationship. Their wedding, which was originally scheduled on 28 August that year, was postponed after it coincided with the death of King Harald V.

Civic offices
Preceded by Reidar Hjermann	Children's Ombudsman of Norway; 2012–2018	Succeeded by Inga Bejer Engh
Political offices
Preceded by Marianne Borgen	Mayor of Oslo; 2023–present	Incumbent
