= Lars Egeland =

Norwegian librarian and politician (born 1957)

Lars Egeland (born 6 December 1957) is a Norwegian librarian and politician for the Socialist Left Party.

He was born in Tønsberg, and finished secondary education in Nøtterøy Municipality in 1976. He held various jobs, but after graduating from the National Library School in 1983 he worked as such in Vestfold from 1985. He was the chief librarian at Vestfold University College from 1995 to 2003, head of department in the Norwegian Archive, Library and Museum Authority from 2003 to 2007 and briefly director at Oslo University College in 2007.

He was a member of the municipal council of Tønsberg Municipality from 1979 to 2007 and Vestfold county council from 1983 to 1987 and 1989 to 1991. He served as a deputy representative to the Parliament of Norway from Vestfold during the terms 2001–2005, 2005–2009 and 2009–2013. When regular representative Inga Marte Thorkildsen became a cabinet member in March 2012, Egeland was promoted to full representative. He joined the Standing Committee on Energy and the Environment.
