= Sunniva Flakstad Ihle =

Norwegian politician (born 1983)

Sunniva Flakstad Ihle (born 20 November 1983) is a Norwegian politician for the Conservative Party.

Hailing from Øyer Municipality, she graduated from the University of Oslo with a bachelor's degree in European studies and an ESST master's degree (Science, Society and Technology in Europe). She was elected to the Oppland county council in 2003 and elected to both the municipal council for Øyer Municipality and the Oppland county council in 2007. She also chaired Oppland Young Conservatives. Nationwide, Ihle became deputy leader of the Young Conservatives, the youth wing of the Conservative Party in 2006. From 2007 she served as secretary-general. Ihle was also elected as a deputy representative to the Parliament of Norway during the terms 2005–2009 and 2009–2013, albeit without meeting in parliamentary session.

She was hired as the director of communications in the Conservative Party, being one of the chief strategists during election campaigns. In April 2017 she was appointed as a State Secretary in the Office of the Prime Minister, overseeing the Prime Minister's affairs in Solberg's Cabinet. She resigned in 2020 and was hired at Yara International, where she became senior vice president of corporate affairs and global initiatives.

She is married to fellow politician Sigbjørn Aanes.

Party political offices
Preceded by Gunnar Kongsrud	Secretary-general of the Norwegian Young Conservatives; 2007–2009	Succeeded by Julie Remen
