= Porsgrunn Upper Secondary School =

School in Porsgrunn, Norway

Coordinates: 59°08′18″N 9°40′08″E

Porsgrunn videregående skole
- Porsgrunn, Telemark; Norway

Information
- Type: Public school
- Head teacher: Laila Lerum, Principal
- Employees: 170
- Enrollment: 1150
- Website: https://www.porsgrunn.vgs.no/

Porsgrunn videregående skole is an upper secondary school located in the town of Porsgrunn, in the county Telemark, in Norway. The school is Telemark county's biggest school together with Skien videregående skole, and has a total of 1150 students and about 170 employees. It is one of 24 schools in Norway to offer an IB Diploma Programme.
