= Sexpo (organisation) =

The Sexpo foundation is a non-profit organisation in Finland, working in the field of sexuality and relationships. The foundation provides sexual counselling and therapy services for individuals, couples and other relationship constellations, and trains sexual counsellors, therapists, educators and other professionals working in the field of sexuality. Sexpo also participates in public discussion, produces publications and training material and upholds a sexuality library.

Sexpo was founded as Seksuaalipoliittinen yhdistys in 1969. In 1997 it was made into a foundation in order to develop professional requirements. The rules of the Sexpo foundation define its intention as:

- to further the realisation of happy, balanced and satisfying sexuality of individuals,
- to act in order to strengthen an open and positive sexuality culture,
- to further sexual freedom and equality,
- to provide information about sexuality and the prevention and cure of sexuality-related problems, and
- to provide professional services in matters related to sexuality.

The work of the Sexpo foundation is "funded by the profits from the training and consultation services, client payments and support from Raha-automaattiyhdistys". The chair of the foundation is J. Tuomas Harviainen, Ph.D.
