= Hans Svelland =

Norwegian politician

Hans Svelland (born 28 November 1943) is a Norwegian politician for the Conservative Party.

He served as a deputy representative to the Parliament of Norway from Oslo during the term 1973–1977. In total he met during 2 days of parliamentary session. From 1986 to 1989 he chaired the city government of Oslo, after the city had been a pioneer in introducing a such government elected through a parliamentary system.

He chaired the Norwegian Young Conservatives from 1969 to 1971.

Party political offices
Preceded by Ragnvald Dahl	Chairman of the Norwegian Young Conservatives; 1969–1971	Succeeded by Jan Petersen
Political offices
Preceded by position created	Chairman of the City Government of Oslo; 1986–1989	Succeeded by Michael Tetzschner
