= Raymond Johansen =

Norwegian politician

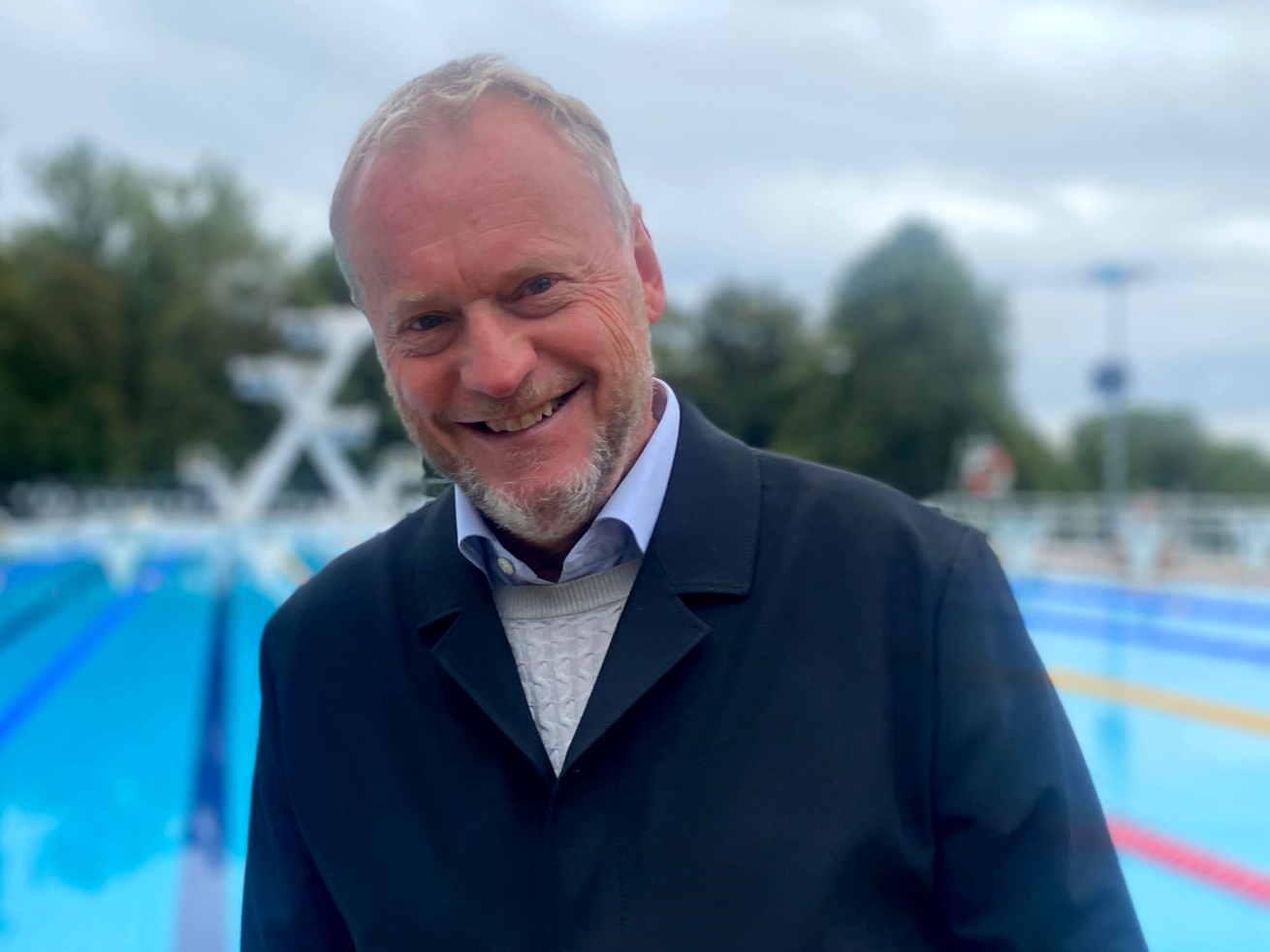
- Johansen in 2021

Governing Mayor of Oslo
- In office 21 October 2015 – 25 October 2023
- Deputy: Lan Marie Berg; Einar Wilhelmsen
- Mayor: Marianne Borgen
- Preceded by: Stian Berger Røsland
- Succeeded by: Eirik Lae Solberg

Party Secretary of the Labour Party
- In office 18 April 2009 – 18 April 2015
- Leader: Jens Stoltenberg; Jonas Gahr Støre
- Preceded by: Martin Kolberg
- Succeeded by: Kjersti Stenseng

Oslo City Commissioner for Transport and the Environment
- In office 1 January 1992 – 25 October 1995
- Governing Mayor: Rune Gerhardsen
- Preceded by: Merete Johnsen
- Succeeded by: Steinar Saghaug

Personal details
- Born: 14 February 1961 (age 65) Oslo, Norway
- Party: Labour; Socialist Left (formerly)
- Spouse: Christin Kristoffersen (m. 2017)
- Children: 2

Raymond Johansen (born 14 February 1961) is a Norwegian politician for the Labour Party. He served as Governing Mayor of Oslo from 2015 to 2023. A former member of the Socialist Left Party, Johansen previously served as the Oslo city commissioner for transport and environment from 1992 to 1995, when his party withdrew from the city cabinet. After joining Labour, he served as the party secretary from 2009 to 2015.

== Early life and education ==
Johansen was born in Oslo and was a plumber by trade.

== Career ==
=== Early career ===
Originally a member of the Socialist Left Party, Johansen chaired their youth wing Socialist Youth from 1986 to 1988 and was a member of the central party board from 1986 to 1991. He chaired the local party chapter in Oslo from 1990 to 1991, and was city commissioner (byråd) of the environment and transport in the city government of Oslo from 1991 to 1995. He was not re-elected in 1995, and left the Socialist Left Party.

He then worked in the Norwegian Agency for Development Cooperation from 1996 to 2000 and was secretary general of the Norwegian Refugee Council from 2002 to 2005. In 2002 he briefly worked at the Norwegian embassy in Asmara. During the first and second cabinet Stoltenberg he was State Secretary in the Ministry of Foreign Affairs.

On 18 March 2007, Johansen met with members of the newly elected Hamas unity government and announced that Norway would resume economic aid. He also expressed hope that other European states would follow their lead.

=== Labour Party Secretary ===
On 21 April 2009, Johansen was elected as Party Secretary of the Labour Party on its national convention, following the footsteps of his uncle, Thorbjørn Berntsen. The position is traditionally both powerful and influential. He was sometimes mentioned in party circles as a possible candidate to succeed party leader Jens Stoltenberg, but did not forward his candidacy and Stoltenberg was subsequently succeeded by Jonas Gahr Støre.

=== Governing Mayor of Oslo ===
Following the 2015 local elections, Johansen became governing mayor of Oslo, leading a coalition consisting of the Labour Party, Socialist Left Party and the Green Party.

Between March and April 2016, the Oslo municipal websites listed Johansen as "byregjeringsleder" (lit. Head of the City Government). However, the Ministry of Local Government and Regional Development ruled that the name change violated the law on local government and Johansen's title was subsequently reverted to "byrådsleder" (Governing Mayor).

On 30 April 2018, Johansen took part in a Dagsrevyen debate with the Minister of Justice, Tor Mikkel Wara, regarding immigration in Oslo. Wara notably blamed gang criminality on the increase of immigration in the capital. Wara further added that gang issues was attributed to ethnic and cultural issues, and that it was the reason for why it was important to stop immigration in Oslo. Johansen defended the city's handling of immigration, citing increase in borough spending and the strengthening of kindergartens and better opportunities to learn Norwegian.

Johansen was re-elected following the 2019 local elections, and presented his new city commissioners on 23 October.

In June 2021, following a motion of no confidence against City Commissioner for Transport and the Environment Lan Marie Berg, Johansen put forward the cabinet question in Oslo's city council, which was supported by the opposition parties. He expressed that he wanted to continue a coalition with the Socialist Left and Green Party should he continue to lead the council cabinet.

On 21 June, mayor of Oslo Marianne Borgen gave Johansen the green light to form a new city council cabinet, after the opposition, led by the Conservative Party, failed to seek enough support for a Conservative led cabinet. Johansen presented his second cabinet on 24 June, with the only change being Sirin Hellvin Stav who succeeded Lan Marie Berg as commissioner for transport and the environment.

In early January 2022, he criticised the government for being unclear its handling of COVID-19. He also asked the health services to document hospitalisations and hospitals' capacity; and that municipalities should be in charge of measures themselves, including the temporary halt on alcohol beverages.

On 3 October, he announced that he would be seeking re-election for a third term in the 2023 local elections.

On 9 February 2023, Johansen conducted a reshuffle of his city commissioners not soon after revelations of dire conditions in care homes in Oslo. The reshuffle included the sacking of Robert Steen, the city commissioner for the elderly, health and labour; he refused to comment on whether this was related to the revelations.

Johansen and his city government stepped down on 25 October 2023 following the 2023 local elections and was succeeded by a new one headed by Eirik Lae Solberg, whom he had previously defeated at the 2019 local elections.

=== Post-politics ===
Shortly before departing as governing mayor, Johansen was chosen as the next secretary-general for Norwegian People's Aid. He is scheduled to assume the position by new year 2024.

== Personal life ==
Johansen is married to Christin Kristoffersen and have two children, and resides in Oslo. From 1999 to 2001 he was a member of the board of Vålerenga Fotball.

Political offices
Preceded by Merete Johnsen	Oslo City Commissioner of Transport and the Environment; 1992–1995	Succeeded by Steinar Saghaug
Preceded by Stian Berger Røsland	Governing Mayor of Oslo; 2015–2023	Succeeded by Eirik Lae Solberg
Party political offices
Preceded by Kristin Halvorsen	Leader of the Socialist Youth; 1986–1988	Succeeded by Paul Chaffey
Preceded by Martin Kolberg	Party Secretary of the Labour Party; 2009–2015	Succeeded by Kjersti Stenseng
