= Eirik Lae Solberg =

Norwegian politician (born 1971)

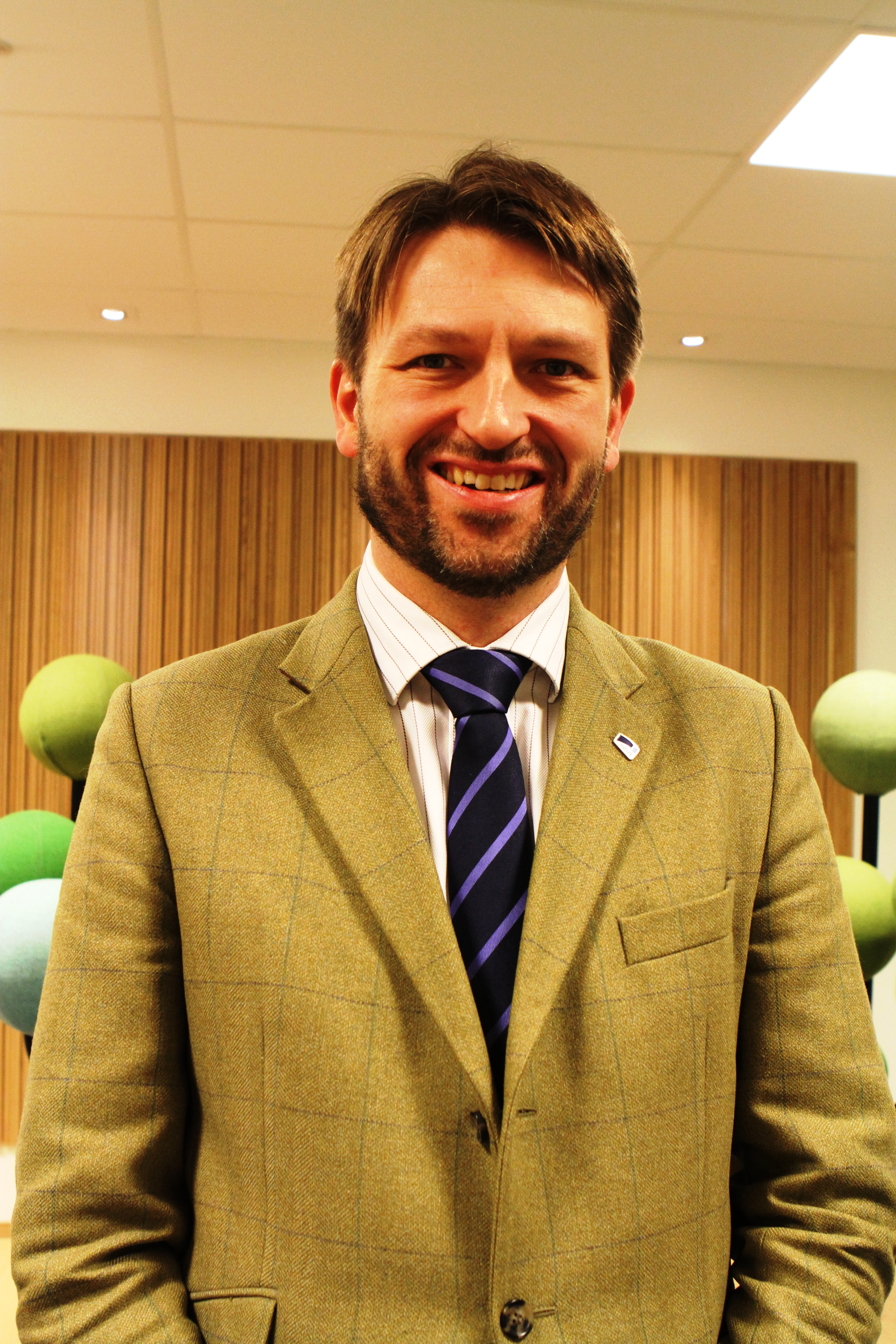

Governing Mayor of Oslo
- Incumbent
- Assumed office 25 October 2023
- Deputy: Hallstein Bjercke
- Mayor: Anne Lindboe
- Preceded by: Raymond Johansen

Oslo City Commissioner for Finance
- In office 4 April 2014 – 21 October 2015
- Governing Mayor: Stian Berger Røsland
- Preceded by: Torger Ødegaard
- Succeeded by: Robert Steen

State Secretary for the Ministry of Trade and Fisheries
- In office 16 October 2013 – 4 April 2014
- Prime Minister: Erna Solberg
- Minister: Monica Mæland

State Secretary for the Ministry of Modernisation
- In office 8 March 2004 – 17 October 2005
- Prime Minister: Kjell Magne Bondevik
- Minister: Morten Meyer

Deputy Member of the Storting
- In office 1 October 2021 – 30 September 2025
- Member: Nikolai Astrup (2021)
- Constituency: Oslo
- In office 1 October 1993 – 30 September 1997
- Constituency: Buskerud

Personal details
- Born: 3 April 1971 (age 55) Drammen, Buskerud, Norway
- Party: Conservative
- Spouse: Hanna Rommerud
- Children: 2
- Education: London School of Economics; University of Cambridge

Eirik Lae Solberg (born 3 April 1971) is a Norwegian politician for the Conservative Party. He has served as the Governing Mayor of Oslo since 2023 and was previously the Oslo City Commissioner for Finance from 2014 to 2015. Lae Solberg served as a deputy member of parliament for Oslo from 2021 to 2025, having previously done so between 1993 and 1997 for Buskerud.

== Education ==
Solberg holds a bachelor's degree in economics from the London School of Economics and Political Science (LSE) and a master's degree in European history and politics from the University of Cambridge.

== Political career ==
=== Local politics ===
Solberg was elected to the Oslo City Council in 2007, and led the committee on finance and the Conservative group from 2009 to 2013.

In 2014, he was appointed city commissioner for finance, a post he held until the Conservative coalition lost the 2015 local elections.

Lae Solberg was elected deputy leader of the Oslo Conservative Party in 2018 with Heidi Nordby Lunde as leader, and was re-elected in 2020.

He was the Oslo Conservative Party's candidate for Governing Mayor in the 2019 local elections. He lost the election to incumbent Raymond Johansen, and resigned as the Conservatives' group leader. He did however retain his council seat.

On 1 July 2022, he was again chosen as the Oslo Conservatives' candidate for Governing Mayor for the 2023 local elections. The Conservative block won a majority in the following election, and the Conservatives initially sought to form a new city government with the Liberal Party, Christian Democrats and the Progress Party, but these negotiations collapsed and the Conservatives then sought to form a minority government with only the Liberal Party. The Progress Party had also ruled out a cooperation agreement with a new city government, citing they would not support a government they weren't a part of. However, they later backtracked and agreed to negotiate a cooperation agreement with the Conservatives and Liberals. The parties presented their platform on 24 October.

=== Governing Mayor of Oslo ===
Lae Solberg and his city government succeeded the Johansen government on 25 October 2023.

He and mayor Anne Lindboe announced in March 2026 that they would seek re-election in 2027.

==== Tenure ====
In mid November, he called on the national government to assist the municipality with police staffing and combating violence and criminal gangs.

With strong blizzards covering large parts of Eastern Norway in January 2024, Lae Solberg advised the public to work from home and not utilise vehicles more than necessary. While several counties in region had closed their schools, he stated he would restrain from doing so in Oslo, citing their importance and a high threshold to do so.

He and finance commissioner Hallstein Bjercke presented Oslo's 2025 budget in September 2024, which notably included a proposed increase of 63% in water and sewage fees for the next four years. Finance minister Trygve Slagsvold Vedum accused the Conservatives of breaking election promises of maintaining decreased fees in municipalities they secured power in. Lae Solberg however criticsed Vedum for taking away millions of NOK from Oslo municipality through the national government's new revenue system for municipalities.

In June 2025, the Progress Party withdrew their support for Lae Solberg's government, leaving it in a minority. The party stated that they were dissatisfied with the changes that the government had implemented.

=== Parliament ===
He served as a deputy representative to the Norwegian Parliament from Buskerud from 1993 to 1997. He was re-elected as a deputy representative in the 2021 election, this time for Oslo. He met as permanent representative for Nikolai Astrup from 1 to 14 October 2021 at the end of the Solberg Cabinet's tenure.

=== Government ===
During the second cabinet Bondevik, Solberg was political advisor in the Ministry of Trade and Industry from 2001 to March 2004, and State Secretary in the Ministry of Work Affairs and Administration (renamed Ministry of Modernization in June 2004) from March 2004 to 2005. In the elections that year, the second cabinet Bondevik fell, thus Solberg lost his position. He was appointed state secretary in the Ministry of Trade and Fisheries in 2013 and held the post until 2014.

== Non-politics ==
In 2020, Lae Solberg was hired to work for Deloitte as a strategic consultant for the public sector.

== Personal life ==
Lae Solberg is married to Hanna Rommerud, with whom he has a son and a daughter.

Political offices
| Preceded by Torger Ødegaard | Oslo City Commissioner for Finance; 2014–2015 | Succeeded by Robert Steen |
| Preceded by Raymond Johansen | Governing Mayor of Oslo; 2023–present | Incumbent |
Party political offices
| Preceded by Kristin Vinje | Deputy Leader of the Conservative Party in Oslo; 2018–2022 | Succeeded by Merete Agerbak-Jensen |
