= Sandefjord Girls Choir =

Norwegian choir

Sandefjord Girls Choir (Norwegian: Sandefjord Jentekor) was a Norwegian girls choir that performed from 1956 to 2009.

It was founded in 1956 by Sverre Valen and had a varied repertoire. In 1969, the choir won its class in the BBC (later EBU) competition Let the Peoples Sing. They won NRK's national competition for youth choirs 15 times. On tours in Europe, the choir performed in cathedrals like Cologne Cathedral, Notre-Dame de Paris and St. Peter's Basilica. In 1976, the choir toured USA for three weeks as part of the United States Bicentennial. The tour ended with a performance in the Carnegie Hall, for which they received an excellent review in The New York Times. Valen stopped conducting the choir in 1997.

Recruiting many of the best singers of the Sandefjord Girls' Choir, Valen started Valen's Soloist Ensemble ( Valens Solistensemble) in 1985 and conducted it to 2000.

Jan Helge Trøen took over as conductor of Sandefjord Girls Choir in 1997. In 1999, the choir became part of the foundation World Festival Choir who hired Vesta Zabulioniene as conductor. During her time the choir held concerts with artists like Tommy Körberg, Benedicte Adrian, Jørn Hoel, Jan Werner Danielsen and Sandra Lyng Haugen. She conducted the choir until 2009 when she decided to concentrate on her own music school and the girls in the choir followed her.

== Selected recordings ==
- Jul med Sandefjord Jentekor. (1970) Conductor:Sverre Valen
- Hymn to Freedom (1990). With Jorunn Marie Bratlie. Conductor:Sverre Valen
- O Helga Natt. (1992) With several others. Conductor:Sverre Valen
- På folkemunne. Norwegian folk tunes. (1994) Conductor:Sverre Valen
- Julemoro. (1994) With Gunstein Draugedalen. Conductor:Sverre Valen
