= Governing Mayor of Oslo =

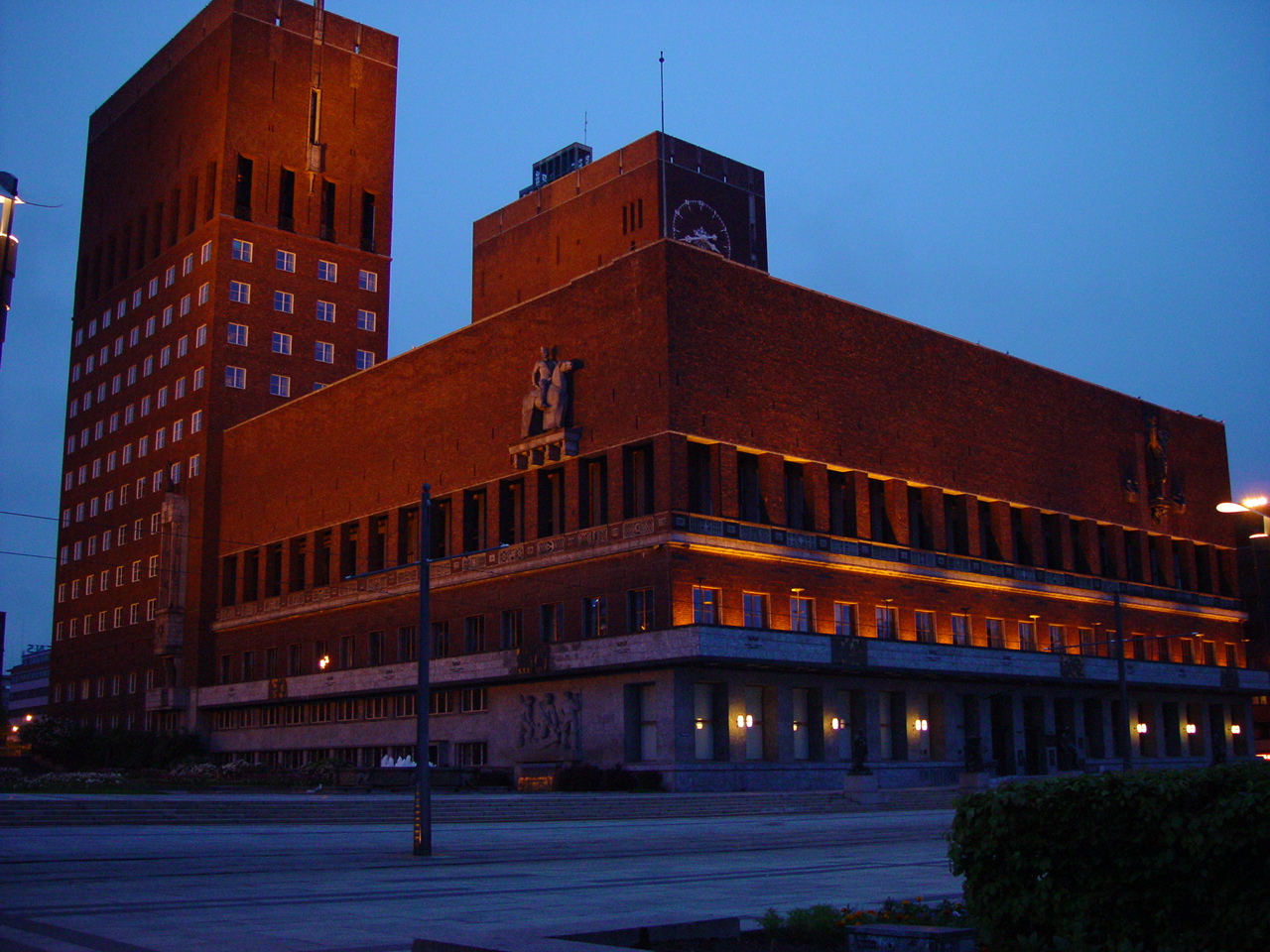
Oslo City Hall

The Governing Mayor of Oslo (Bokmål: Oslos byrådsleder; Nynorsk: Oslos byrådsleiar) is the head of the city government of Oslo. The Governing Mayor appoints and removes the members (vice mayors) of the city cabinet and decides how the departments and the central administration are organised. The city government consists of eight members.

== List of governing mayors ==
Key
Conservative Party
Labour Party

Portrait	Name	Party	Took office	Left office	Tenure	Election(s)
	Hans Svelland	Conservative	5 February 1986	1 March 1989	3 years, 24 days	1987
	Michael Tetzschner	Conservative	1 March 1989	1 January 1992	2 years, 306 days	–
	Rune Gerhardsen	Labour	1 January 1992	15 January 1997	5 years, 14 days	1991; 1995
	Fritz Huitfeldt	Conservative	15 January 1997	29 November 2000	3 years, 319 days	1999
	Erling Lae	Conservative	29 November 2000	29 September 2009	8 years, 304 days	2003; 2007
	Stian Berger Røsland	Conservative	29 September 2009	21 October 2015	6 years, 22 days	2011
	Raymond Johansen	Labour	21 October 2015	25 October 2023	8 years, 4 days	2015; 2019
	Eirik Lae Solberg	Conservative	25 October 2023	present	2 years, 159 days	2023
