= Kristin Vinje =

Norwegian politician (born 1963)

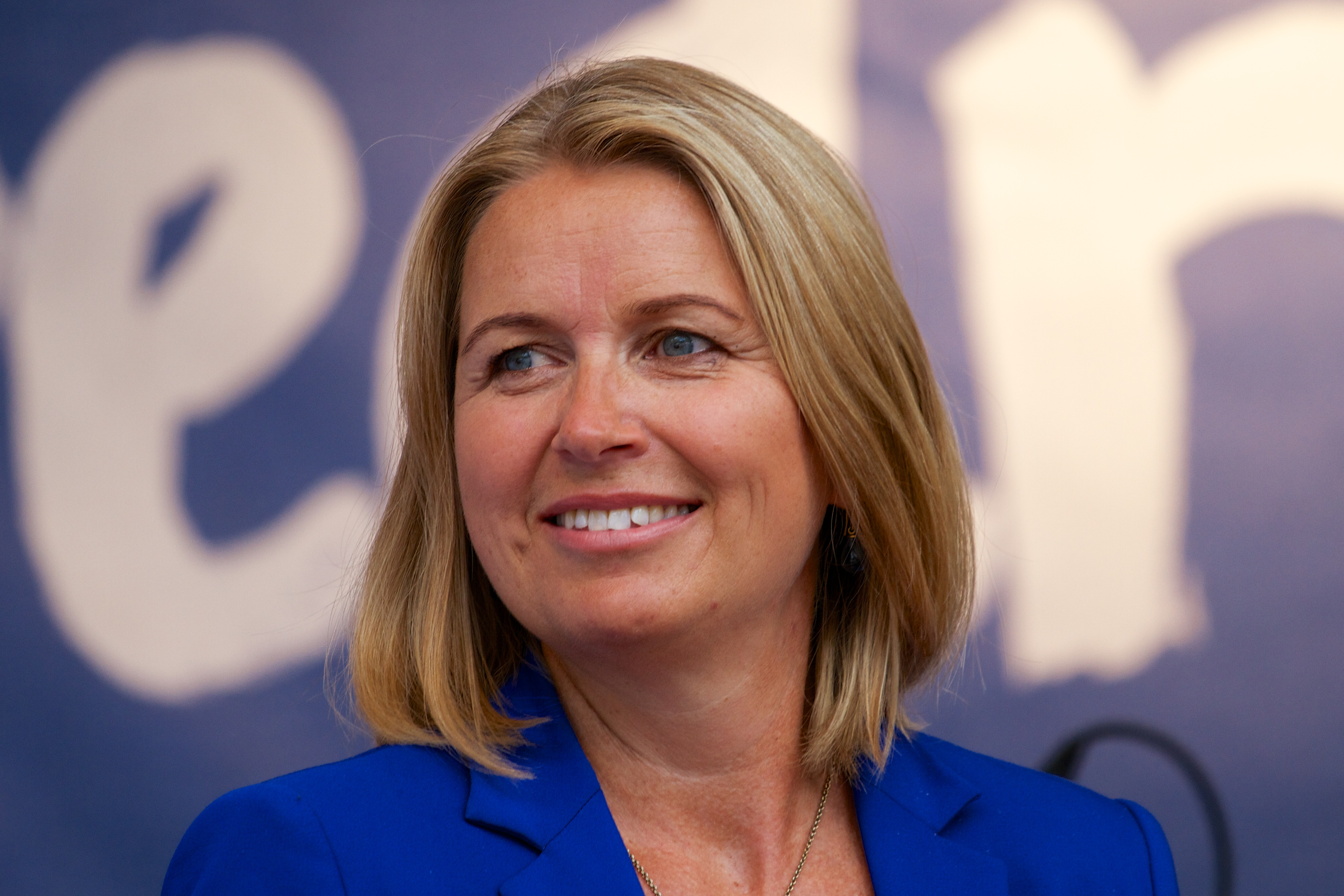

Kristin Vinje (born Kristin Sørby; 10 June 1963) is a Norwegian chemist and politician for the Conservative Party. She served as city commissioner for finance in Oslo from 2009 to 2013 when she was elected to the Parliament of Norway.

Vinje was awarded a Ph.D. in chemistry by the University of Oslo in 1994. She worked as a researcher at SINTEF from 1996 to 2002 and worked for the Ministry of Trade and Industry (Norway) from 2002 to 2005. She was vice-director of Simula Research Laboratory from 2005 to 2007 and director of Simula School of Research and Innovation from 2007 to 2009. She works as Chief Executive at the Norwegian Agency for Quality Assurance in Education and serves as a board member of the ENQA since 2023.

She is married and has four children.
