= Marianne Borgen =

Norwegian politician (born 1951)

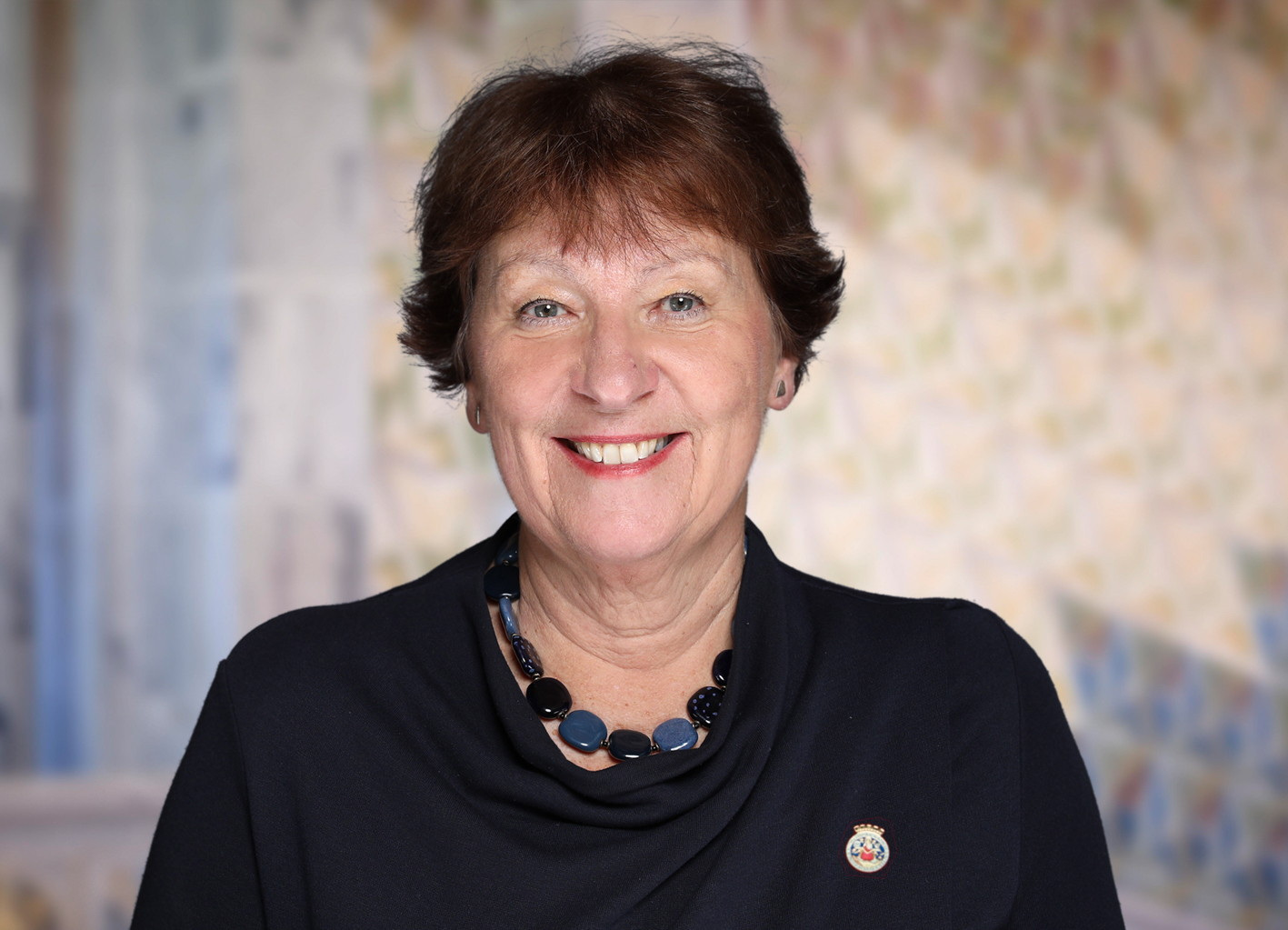
- Marianne Borgen in 2019; Photo: Sturlason/Oslo kommune

67th Mayor of Oslo
- In office 21 October 2015 – 25 October 2023
- Deputy: Kamzy Gunaratnam; Abdullah Alsabeehg
- Governing Mayor: Raymond Johansen
- Preceded by: Fabian Stang
- Succeeded by: Anne Lindboe

Personal details
- Born: 2 June 1951 (age 75) Oslo, Norway
- Party: Socialist Left
- Spouse: Lars B. Kristofersen
- Children: 3

Marianne Borgen (born 2 June 1951) is a Norwegian politician for the Socialist Left Party, who served as Mayor of Oslo from 2015 to 2023.

She finished her secondary education at Sofienberg Upper Secondary School in 1975, graduated from the University of Oslo with the cand.mag. degree in 1975 and the cand.sociol. degree in 1979. While studying she was a journalist in Universitas from 1976 to 1978. She worked as a consultant in the Ministry of Local Government and Labour from 1979 to 1985, for the Ombudsman for Children in Norway from 1985 to 1995, for the County Governor of Oslo and Akershus from 1995 to 1997 and then in Save the Children in Norway. Here she has been responsible for the "Norway program". She has represented Save the Children in the Forum for Children and Families in the Council of Europe.

As a politician, Borgen was a member of her borough council from 1973 to 1976, and of Oslo city council from 1979 to 1983 and from 1995 to present. She served as a deputy representative to the Parliament of Norway from Oslo during the terms 1989–1993, 1993–1997, 1997–2001 and 2001–2005. In total, she sat during eighteen days of parliamentary session. In 2007, she was the Socialist Left Party's candidate to become Mayor of Oslo, without succeeding. She was elected mayor in 2015 and re-elected in 2019. In February 2022, she announced that she wouldn't be seeking re-election as mayor in 2023. Following the election, she was succeeded by Anne Lindboe.

Borgen was a board member of Lovisenberg Hospital from 1992 to 1994 and a deputy board member of Norwegian Social Research from 1996 to 2001. She has also co-administered research projects for the Research Council of Norway. From 1994 to 1996 and since 2006 she is a board member of Aker Hospital.
