= Government of Oslo =

Oslo City Council

Leadership
- Mayor: Anne Lindboe
- Governing Mayor: Eirik Lae Solberg

Structure
- Seats: 59
- Political groups: Conservative Party (20); Labour Party (11); Green Party (6); Liberal Party (6); Socialist Left Party (6); Progress Party (4); Red Party (4); Center Party (1); Christian Democratic Party (1)
- Committees: List: Procedures; Control; Finance; Health and Welfare; Urban Development; Education and Cultural Affairs; Transport and Environmental Affairs

Elections
- Last election: 2023
- Next election: 2027

Meeting place
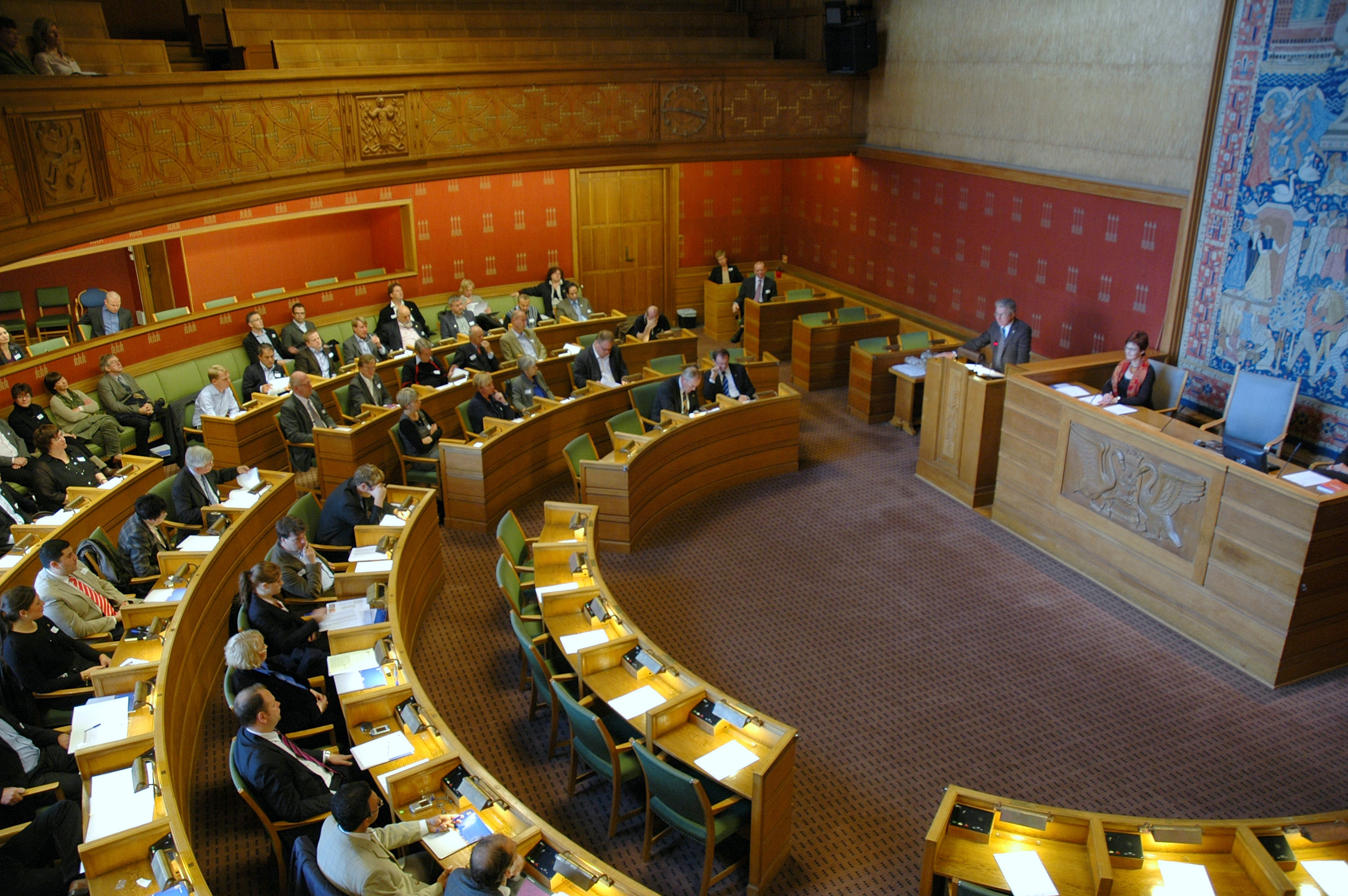
- Oslo City Hall

Website
- https://www.oslo.kommune.no/english/

The government of Oslo, the capital of Norway, consists of a mayor, governing mayor and the Oslo City Council. The governing mayor appoints members of the city cabinet, while the mayor administers city services, public property and law enforcement.

== Governance ==
Constituting both a municipality and a county of Norway, the city of Oslo is represented in the Storting by twenty Members of Parliament as of 2021. The Conservative Party has five representatives in Oslo's delegation, the Labour Party has four, the Liberals and the Socialist Left Party have three each, the Green Party and the Red Party have two each and the Progress Party has one.

The combined municipality and county of Oslo has had a parliamentary system of government since 1986. The supreme authority of the city is the City Council (Bystyret), which currently has 59 seats. Representatives are popularly elected every four years. The city council has five standing committees, each having its own areas of responsibility. These are: Health and Social Welfare; Education and Cultural Affairs; Urban Development; Transport and Environmental Affairs; and Finance. The executive branch (Byrådet) consists of the Governing mayor (byrådsleder) and currently seven vice mayors or Commissioners (byråder, sing. byråd) holding ministerial positions. The vice mayors are appointed and removed by the Governing mayor. The Governing mayor and the vice mayors can individually or collectively be voted out of office by the city council.

Since the local elections of 2023, the city government has been a coalition of the Conservative Party and Liberal Party, with support from the Progress Party and Christian Democratic Party.

After the 2023 local elections the negotiations took a while and the Liberal Party wanted to include the Green Party rather than the Progress Party and Christian Democratic Party. The Greens wanted the Liberal Party to join the red-green bloc, which did not happen.

After the 2023 elections the Center Party, a minor party with no parliamentary representation managed to secure one seat in the City Council. The Centre Party therefore managed to beat the Centre Party who is currently the third biggest party in the Storting and a member of the Støre Government.

== Mayor ==
The Mayor of Oslo is the head of the city council and the highest-ranking representative of the city. This used to be the most powerful political position in Oslo, but following the implementation of parliamentarism, the mayor has had more of a ceremonial role, similar to that of the president of the Storting at the national level. The current mayor of Oslo is Anne Lindboe.

== Governing mayor ==
The Governing Mayor of Oslo is the head of the city council. The post was created with the implementation of parliamentarism in Oslo and is similar to the role of the prime minister at the national level. The current governing mayor is Erik Lae Solberg.

== Administrative divisions ==
Following the latest reform of 1 January 2004, the city is divided into fifteen boroughs (bydeler) that are to a considerable extent self-governed. Each borough is responsible for local services not overseen by the city council, such as social services, basic healthcare, and kindergartens. Sentrum (the city centre) and Marka (the rural/recreational areas surrounding the city) are separate geographical entities, but do not have an administration of their own. Sentrum is governed by the borough of St. Hanshaugen. The administration of Marka is shared between neighbouring boroughs.
