= 2023 Norwegian local elections =

2023 election for the municipalities and counties of Norway

← 2019	11 September 2023	2027 →
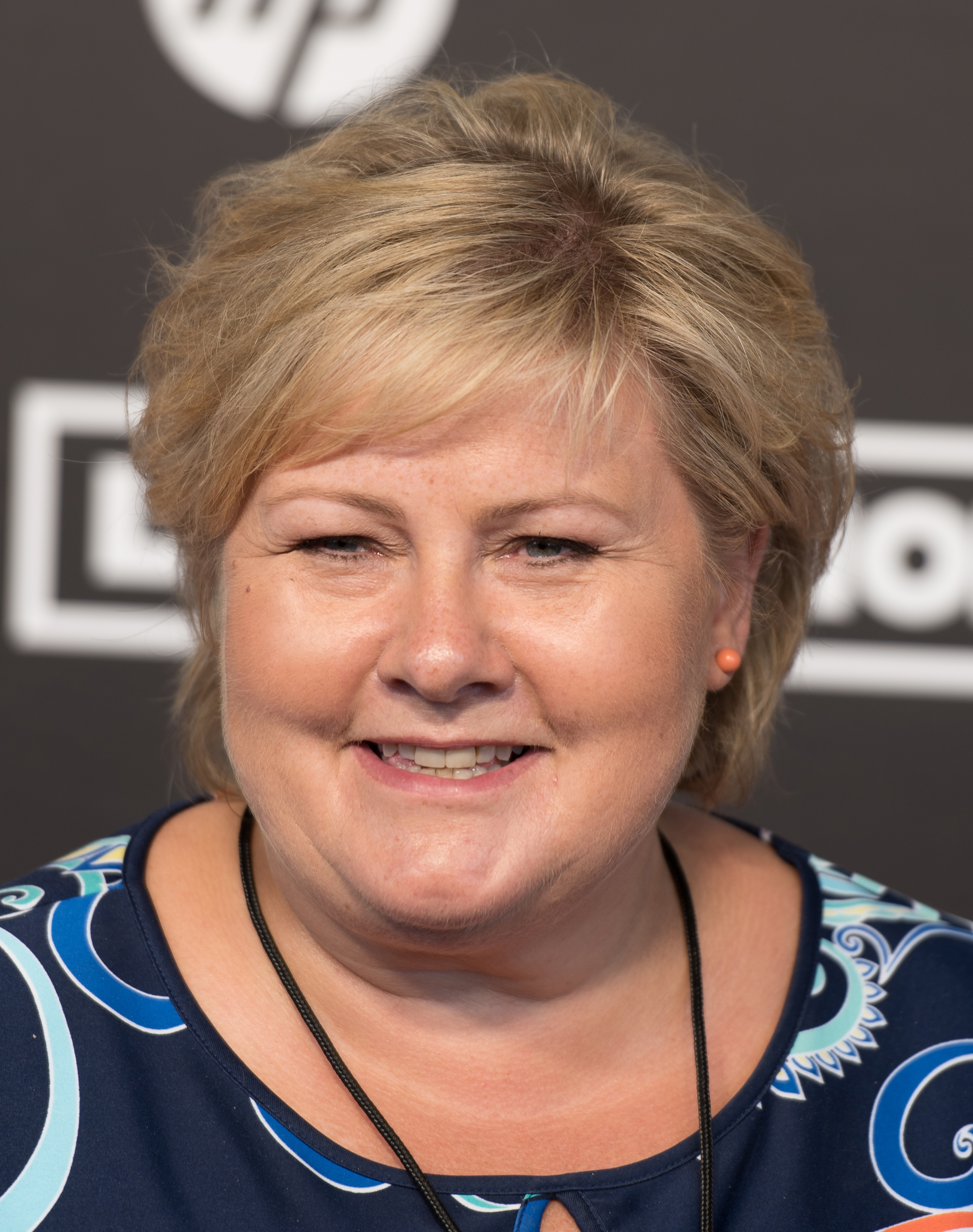

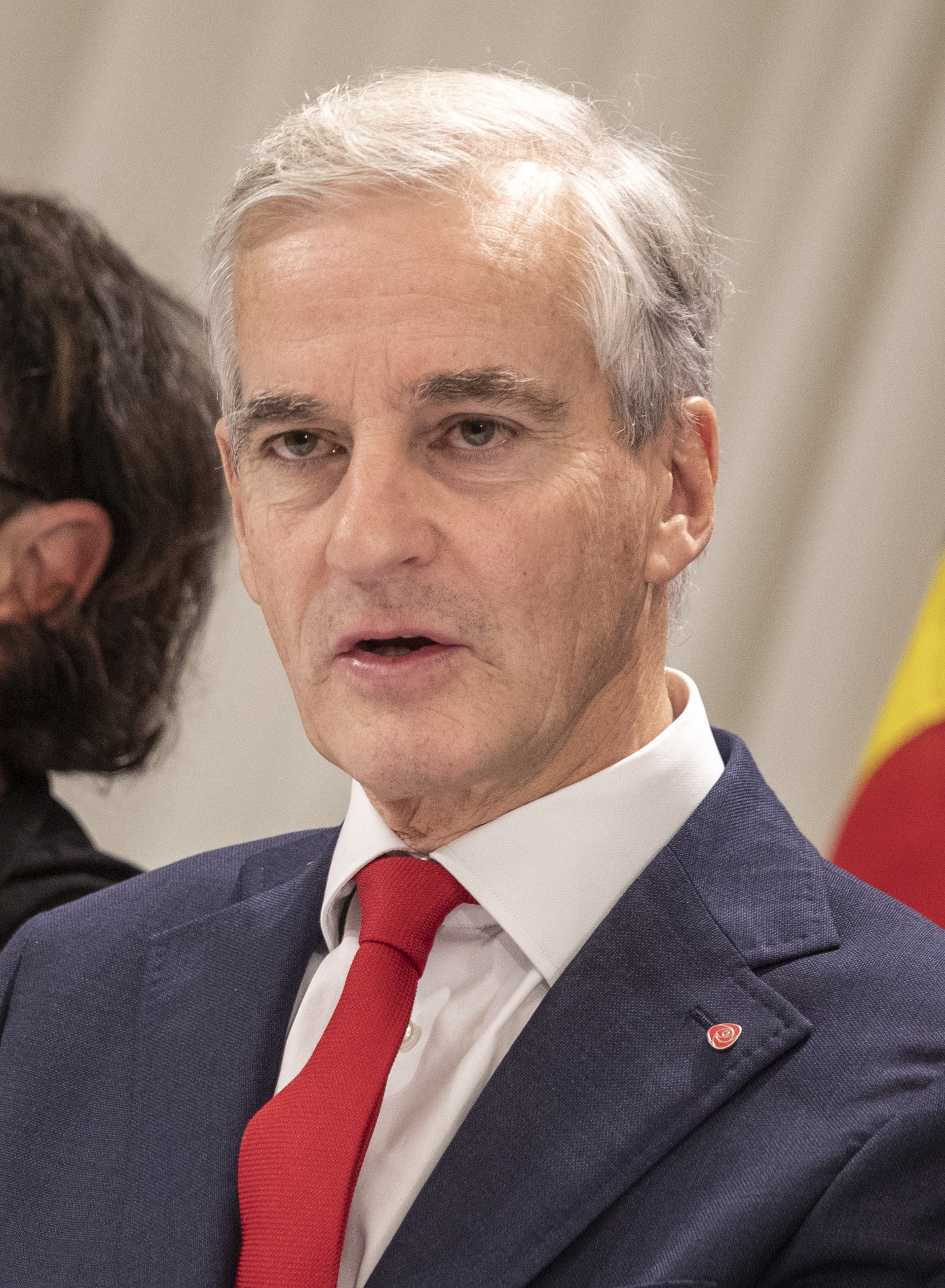

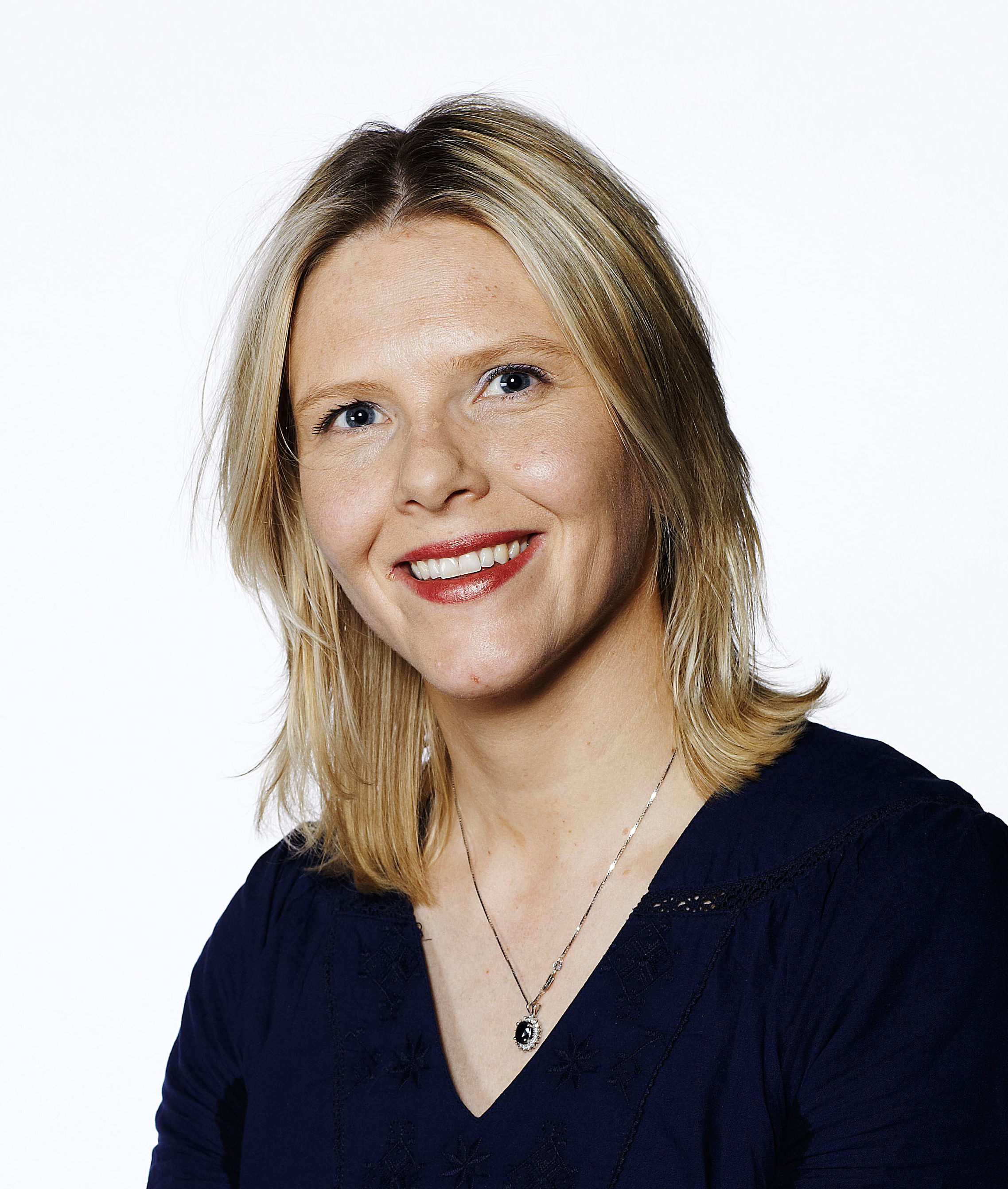

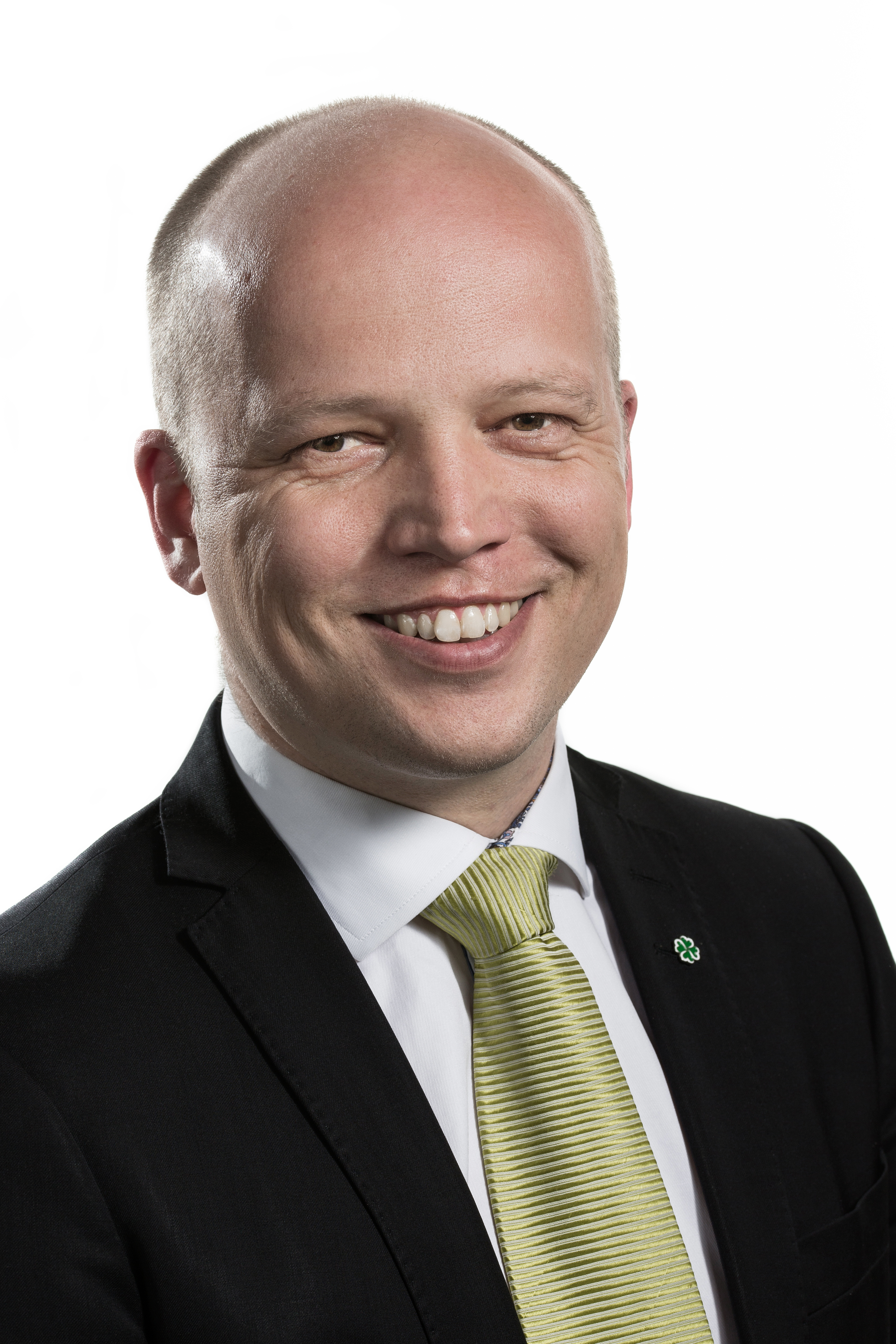

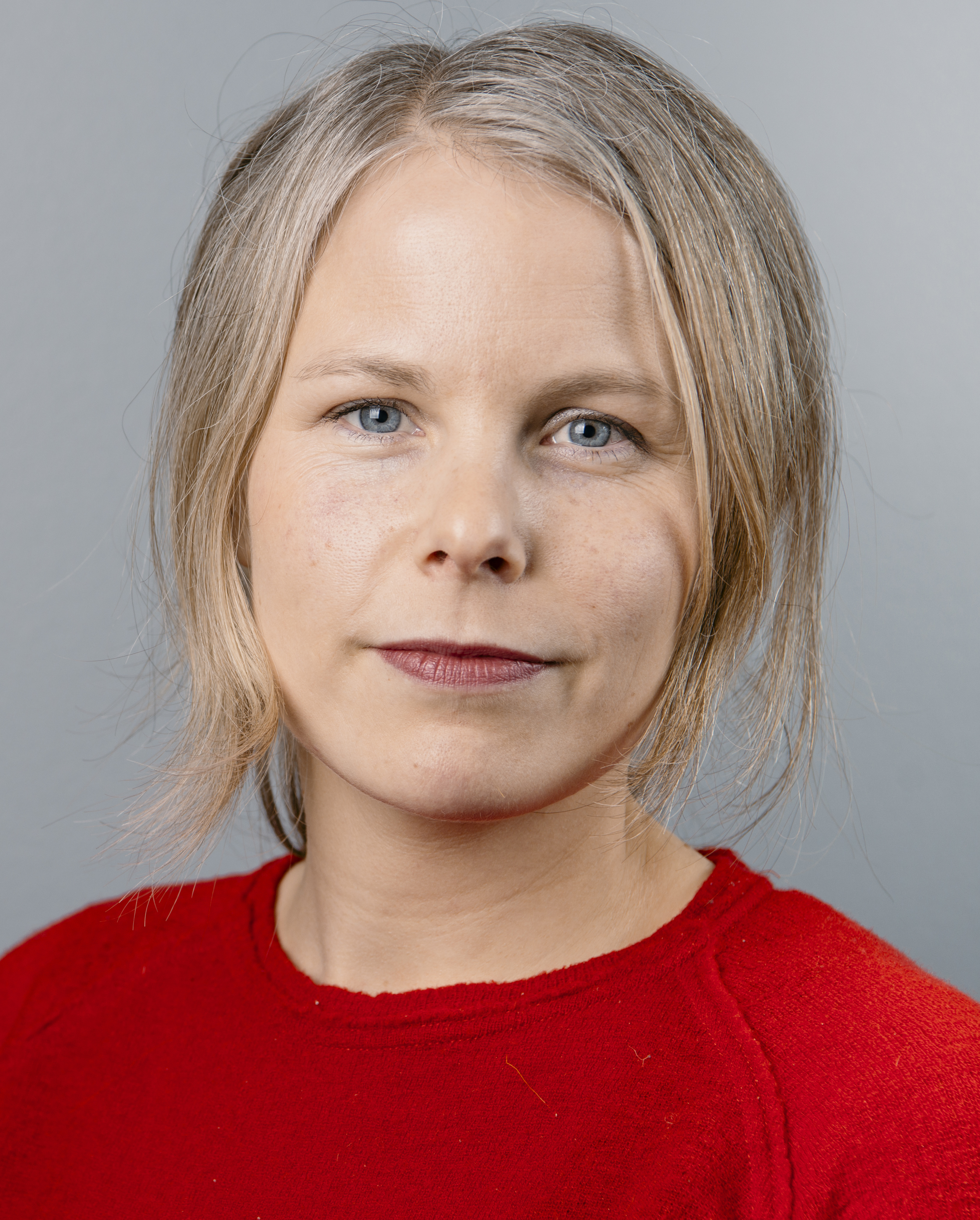

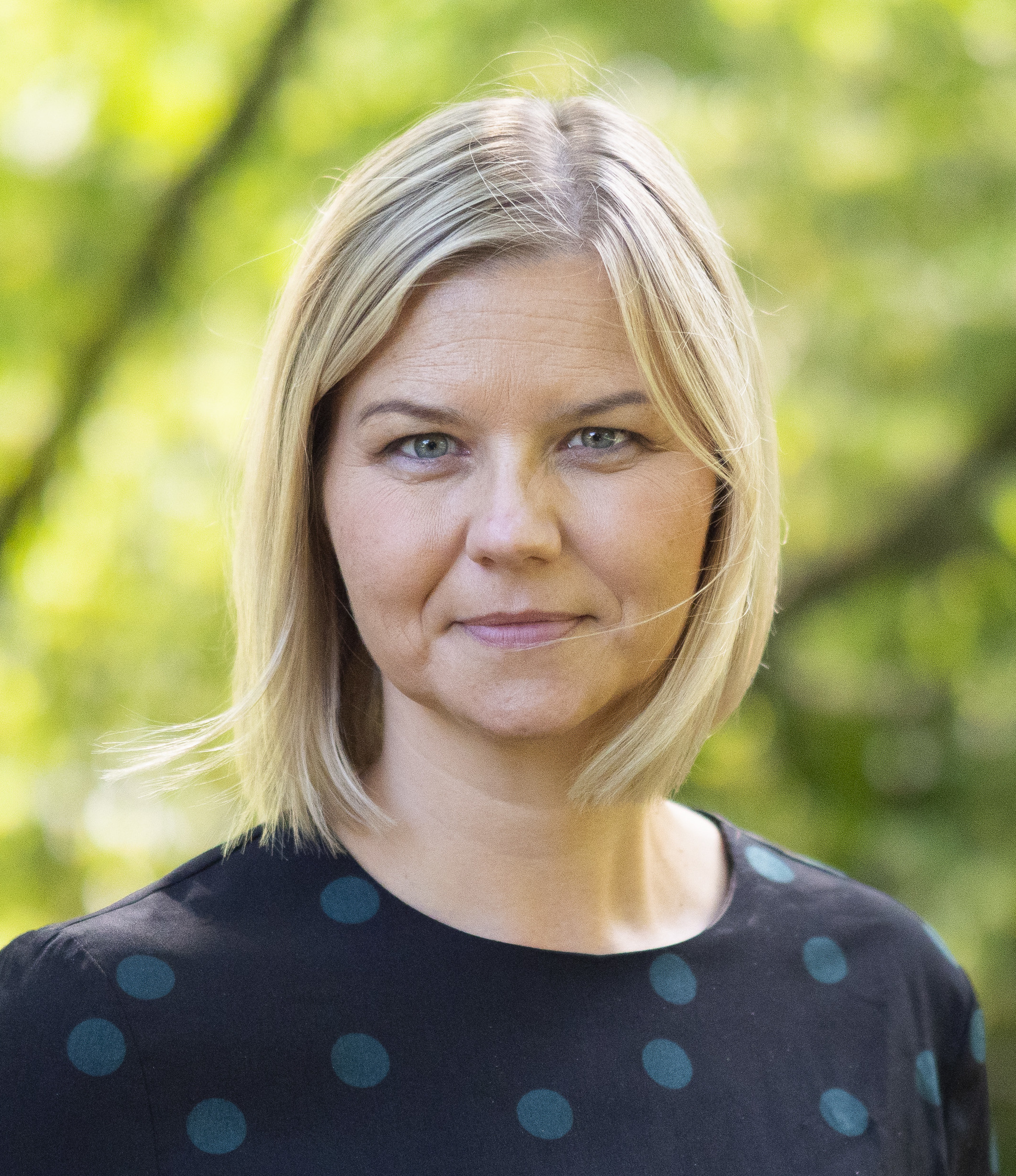

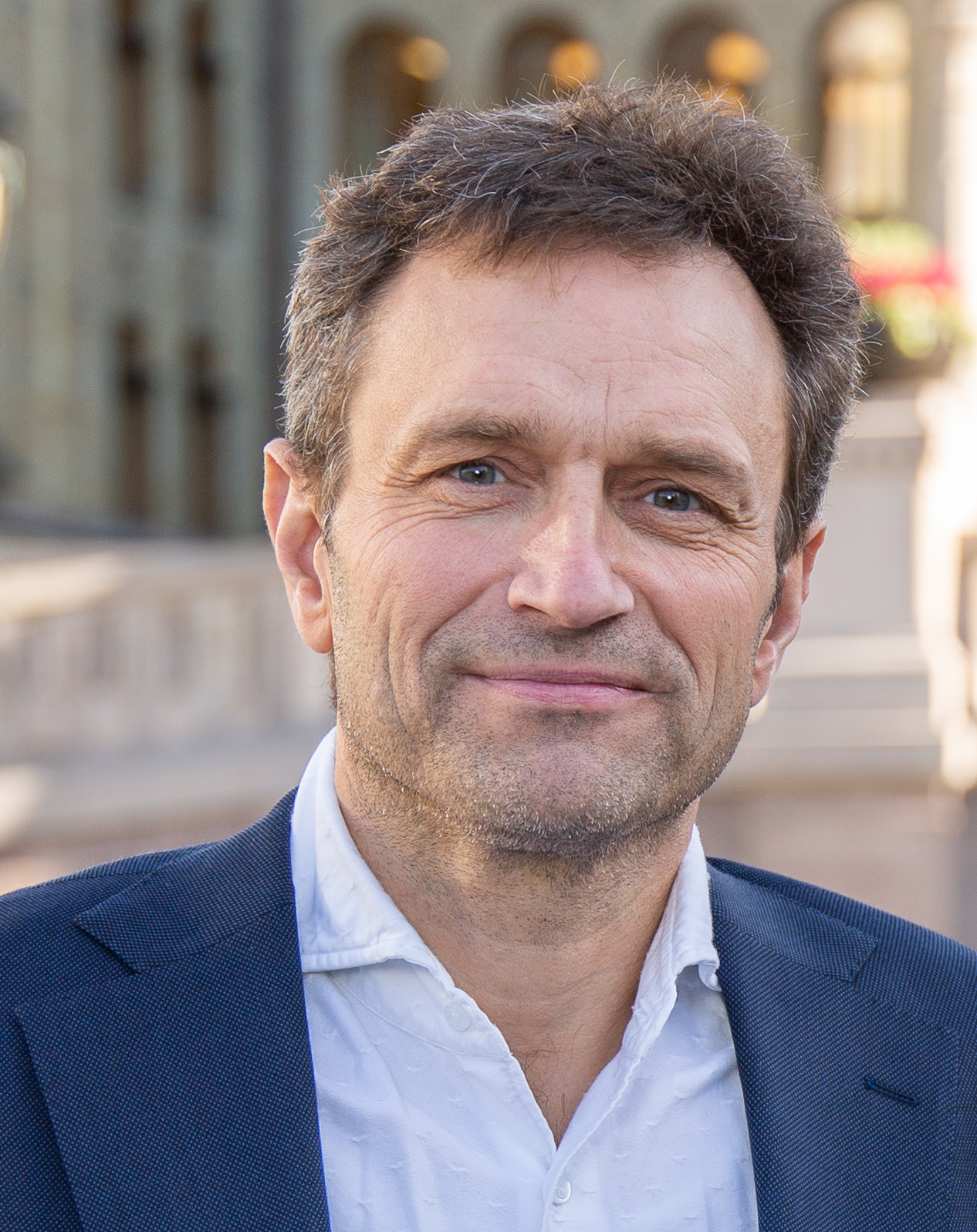

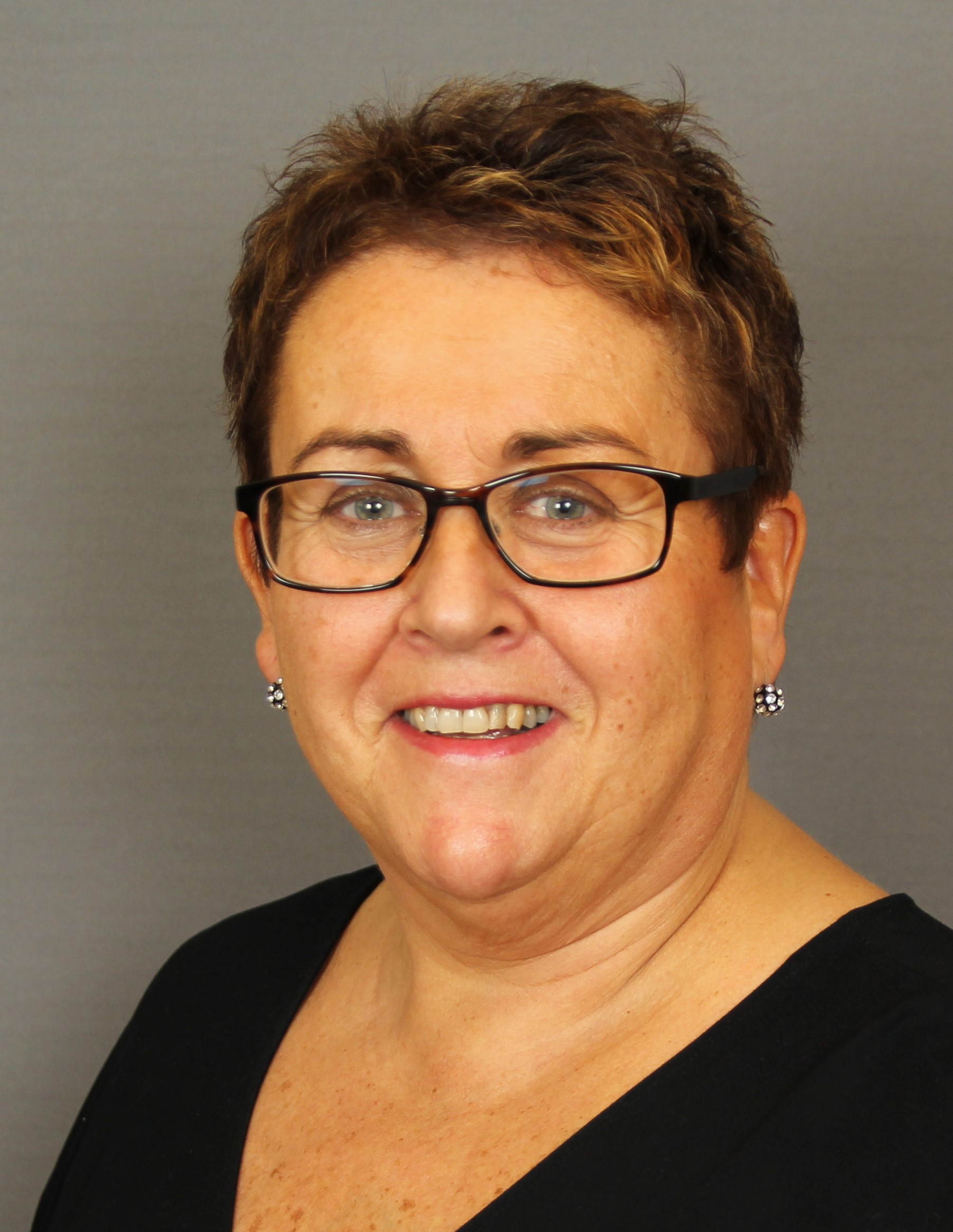

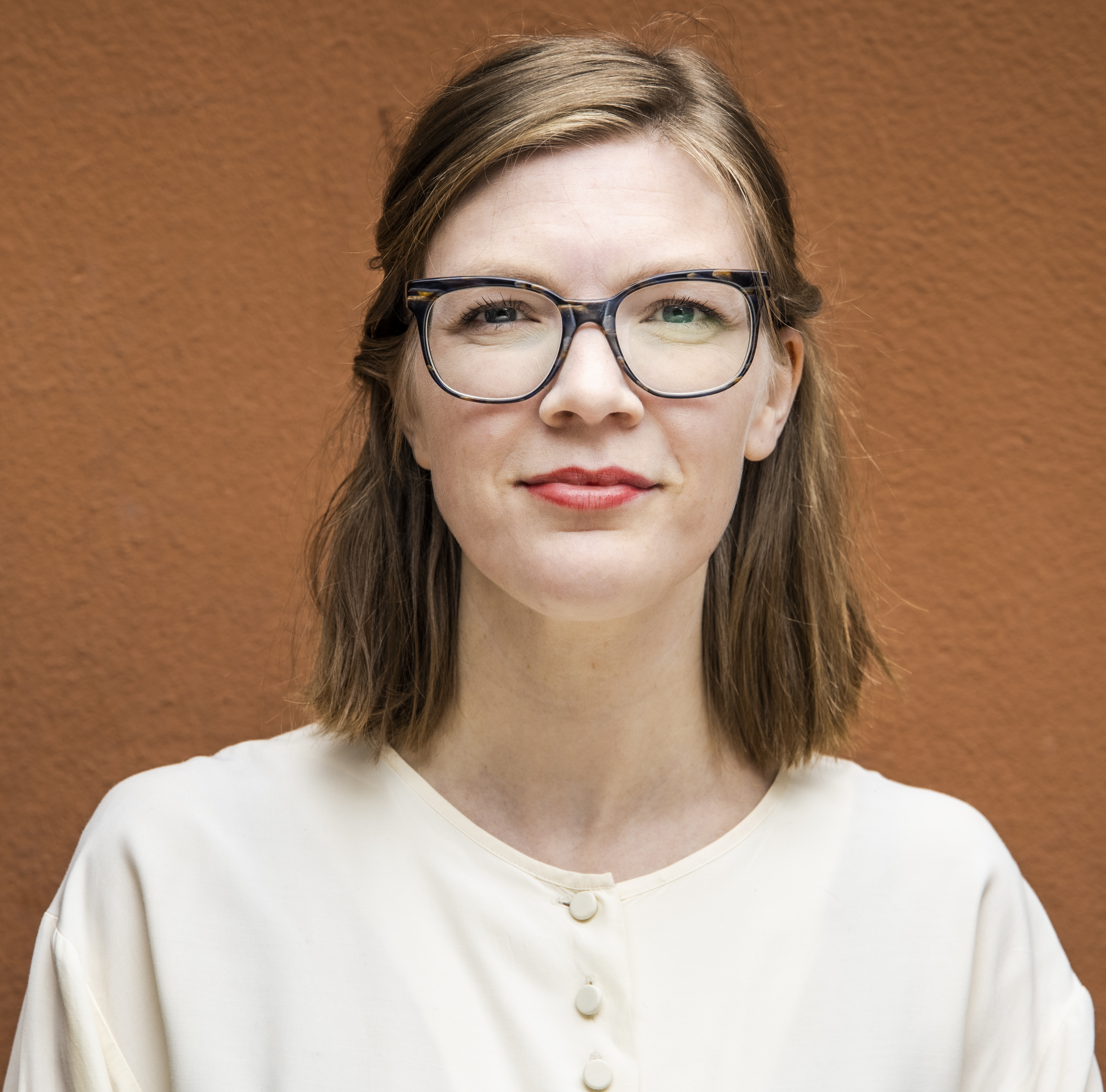
	Majority party	Minority party	Third party
Leader	Erna Solberg	Jonas Gahr Støre	Sylvi Listhaug
Party	Conservative	Labour	Progress
Last election	20.1%	24.8%	8.2%
Percentage	25.9%	21.7%	11.4%
Swing	▲5.8 pp	▼3.1 pp	▲3.2 pp
	Fourth party	Fifth party	Sixth party
Leader	Trygve Slagsvold Vedum	Kirsti Bergstø	Guri Melby
Party	Centre	Socialist Left	Liberal
Last election	14.4%	6.1%	3.9%
Percentage	8.2%	6.8%	5.0%
Swing	▼6.2 pp	▲0.7 pp	▲1.1 pp
	Seventh party	Eighth party	Ninth party
Leader	Arild Hermstad	Olaug Bollestad	Marie Sneve Martinussen
Party	Green	Christian Democratic	Red
Last election	6.8%	4.0%	3.8%
Percentage	4.1%	4.0%	3.5%
Swing	▼2.7 pp	0.0 pp	▼0.3 pp
- Largest party in each municipality and county.

The 2023 Norwegian local elections were held on 11 September 2023. Voters elected representatives to municipal and county councils, which are responsible for education, public transportation, healthcare, elderly care, waste disposal, the levy of certain taxes, and more. All council seats were up for election across the 15 (Note: From 1 January 2024, the number of counties will be increased from 11 to 15. The 2023 elections operate with these 2024 boundaries.) counties and 357 municipalities of Norway.

The previous local elections, held in September 2019, resulted in a nationwide victory for the centre-left parties, known as the red-green coalition. The five red-green parties, namely the Labour, Centre, Green, Socialist Left, and Red parties, secured around 56% of the national popular vote in the municipal elections at that time. Meanwhile, the then-ruling majority in the Storting, made up of the Conservative, Progress, Christian Democratic, and Liberal parties, scored roughly 36% nationally. The red-greens also retained control of the major cities of Oslo, Bergen, and Trondheim. In the 2023 elections, incumbent red-green mayors were seeking to defend these seats from centre-right challengers, as opinion polls showed the centre-right bloc rebounding.

The election resulted in the Conservative Party of opposition leader Erna Solberg emerging as the largest party nationwide, taking just under 26% of the vote. This marked the first time since the 1924 Norwegian parliamentary election that the Conservatives had come in first place in a national election. It also brought to an end the Labour Party's 96-year continuous streak as Norway's largest political party, which began with the elections of 1927 and was a defining feature of Norway's political landscape for most of the 20th and early 21st centuries. In addition, the right-wing Progress Party of Sylvi Listhaug regained its position as the country's third largest party, after having fallen behind Trygve Slagsvold Vedum's Centre Party in 2019. Overall, the vote was described as a realignment of the country's political scene, with the centre-right bloc emerging victorious nationally with around 46% of the vote in the municipal elections, against approximately 44% for the red-green parties. A number of major cities previously controlled by the Labour Party and its allies, including the capital city of Oslo, changed hands in this election, electing new centre-right mayors.

== Background ==
=== Administrative system ===
Local administration in Norway is undertaken by the country's subnational divisions, the first-level counties (fylkeskommune) and the second-level municipalities (kommune). Norway is a unitary state, meaning that local governments exert little autonomy beyond what is granted to them by the central Government of Norway. However, each county and municipality is responsible for day-to-day management of various services such as lower-level education, public transportation, and healthcare. Some municipalities also operate with a property tax which funds the municipalities directly, in addition to any funding received from the central government.

Counties and municipalities in Norway are administered by directly elected councils, called county councils (fylkesting) and municipal councils (kommunestyre). These are up for election every four years, midway through the term of the Storting, the parliament of Norway. These councils elect a county mayor (fylkesordfører) or a mayor (ordfører) who leads council sessions and partakes in the administration of the county or municipality. On the municipal level, the mayor does not need to maintain the confidence of the council for the duration of the four-year term, and once elected, they remain in their position for the remainder of the term.

A number of larger cities, including Oslo and Bergen, operate with an alternative system of "city parliamentarism" (byparlamentarisme), under which the city's elected administration is headed by a governing mayor (byrådsleder), who leads a cabinet consisting of several officials in a model mirroring the system used for national government. Under this model, an incumbent administration requires the confidence of the local council throughout their term; should they lose it, they may be forced to resign so that a new administration with the confidence of the council can take office. In 2021, the city administration of Oslo led by Raymond Johansen lost a vote of no confidence lodged against one of its officials, Lan Marie Berg, and the entire administration subsequently resigned. However, Johansen was able to resume his position anew shortly thereafter, forming a new administration without Berg and with majority support in the council.

=== Electoral system ===
The county and municipal councils are elected by proportional representation, using a modified variant of the Sainte-Laguë method, for fixed terms of four years. Elections are always held in the first half of September, and any citizen of Norway who turns 18 years of age by the end of the calendar year is eligible to vote, meaning that 17-year-olds may vote as long as they turn 18 before 31 December. In addition, residents of Norway who are citizens of one of the other Nordic countries, namely Sweden, Iceland, Denmark, and Finland may vote provided they obtained a residency permit before 30 June of the election year. Citizens of non-Nordic countries may vote provided they have held residency and resided in Norway uninterrupted for at least three consecutive years leading up to election day.

Norwegian elections ordinarily allow for advance voting or early voting, and in the 2023 local elections, this was possible in the period from 3 July until 9 August. Municipalities typically allocate public buildings such as town halls, public libraries, and schools for advance voting. When voting, voters choose at most one electoral list for each of the county and municipal councils; the voter may select the ballots of two different parties if they wish. Once the polls close, the ballots are counted immediately, and projections and results are typically broadcast on most major Norwegian television networks throughout election night. Seats are awarded proportionally to the political parties and lists both on the county and municipal level. After the election, local political leaders negotiate to form local administrations, which may be one-party or multi-party constellations depending on the composition of the council.

=== Local government reform ===
Shortly after coming to power in the 2013 parliamentary election, then-Prime Minister Erna Solberg of the Conservative Party and her centre-right coalition initiated a local government reform aimed at reducing the total number of counties and municipalities in Norway. The stated purpose of this reform was to effectivize the local administrative system and to reduce bureaucracy. The first initiative was passed in 2015, with a "regional reform" bill passed in 2017, and subsequently a number of counties and municipalities were merged; the 19 counties of Norway were reduced in number to 11, while the number of municipalities was reduced from 428 to 356 in the period from 2014 to 2020. The reforms faced resistance from some parties in the parliamentary opposition, however, and in the run-up to the 2021 parliamentary election, the Centre Party in particular pledged to at least partially reverse the local government reform. The Centre Party, in alliance with the Labour Party and other center-left parties, won a majority in the 2021 election and formed a new government under Labour leader Jonas Gahr Støre. His government, once in power, allowed for those local governments that had been merged to decide for themselves whether they wanted to continue in their current form, or if they wanted to split up and revert to their pre-reform borders. As a result, several local governments voted to reverse their mergers over the following months. Among these was the council of the newly formed county of Viken, which voted in early 2022 to reverse the merger and revert to the pre-reform counties of Akershus, Buskerud, and Østfold. Likewise, the new counties of Troms og Finnmark and Vestfold og Telemark will also split up. Although Norway still practically operates with 11 counties at the time of the 2023 local elections, the vote is based on the new borders, meaning that any counties and municipalities that are in the process of splitting up will elect their own separate councils, which will remain in office after the split is completed. From 1 January 2024, there will be 15 counties in Norway.

== Campaign ==
=== Debates ===
2023 Norwegian local elections debates
Date	Time	Organisers	P Present I Invitee N Non-invitee									
Date	Time	Organisers	Ap	H	Sp	Frp	MDG	SV	KrF	V	R	Refs
6 Sep	?	VG TV	N	N	P Trygve Slagsvold Vedum	P Sylvi Listhaug	N	N	N	N	N	
9 August	?	VG	P Jonas Gahr Støre	P Erna Solberg	P Trygve Slagsvold Vedum	P Sylvi Listhaug	N	N	N	N	N	
17 August	21:15–23:00	NRK	P Jonas Gahr Støre	P Erna Solberg	P Trygve Slagsvold Vedum	P Sylvi Listhaug	P Arild Hermstad	P Kirsti Bergstø	P Olaug Bollestad	P Guri Melby	P Marie Sneve Martinussen	
29 August	21:40–23:10	TV 2	P Jonas Gahr Støre	P Erna Solberg	P Trygve Slagsvold Vedum	P Sylvi Listhaug	P Arild Hermstad	P Kirsti Bergstø	P Olaug Bollestad	P Guri Melby	P Marie Sneve Martinussen	

=== School elections ===
In Norway, school elections are held every two years in the weeks leading up to major elections, including parliamentary and local elections. In school elections, students at Norwegian high schools, ordinarily aged between 15 and 19, are invited to partake in a mock election in which they cast ballots for the various Norwegian political parties. This arrangement was introduced in 1989, and forms part of the students' civic education and typically receives particular focus in general social science classes. During the election campaign, the country's various youth parties send delegations to high schools where multi-party debates are held, largely on issues concerning students and youth. The students themselves also frequently prepare for, and participate in, their own political debates as a school assignment. In the 2023 local elections, 391 high schools across the country signed up for the school election process, of which 368 registered their results in time for them to be included in the national results; voting took place on 4 and 5 September.

In the 2023 school elections, the Conservatives emerged as the largest party, securing 21.9% of the vote, an increase of 8.9 points from the previous comparable election in 2019. The Progress Party came in second place with 19.5%, more than doubling its share from 2019. The Labour Party scored just 17.0%, a 9.5 point drop from the 26.5% it obtained in the 2019 vote. In all, the five red-green parties obtained a nationwide score of 40.6% against 53.6% for the four centre-right parties, in a sharp reversal of the results in both 2019 and 2021. Reacting to his party's victory and referring to the poor showing of the Green Party in particular, the leader of the Norwegian Young Conservatives, Ola Svenneby, said "I think we can pronounce 'Generation Greta Thunberg' dead", sparking some controversy and reactions from environmentalists and other political opponents. Responding to the criticism, Svenneby later commented on his own statement, saying "It was not my intention to attack the climate enthusiasm that many young people have. I believe the Young Conservatives remain a climate party".

== Opinion polling ==
=== Municipal elections ===
In the run-up to the election, various organizations conducted opinion polls to gauge voting intentions. Below is a week-by-week average of all opinion polls conducted on voting intention for the municipal elections, aggregated by poll tracker pollofpolls.no.

Week	Timespan	Ap	H	Sp	Frp	MDG	SV	KrF	V	R	Others	Lead
2023 election	11 Sep	21.7	25.9	8.2	11.4	4.1	6.8	4.0	5.0	3.5	9.4	4.2
Week 36	4–10 Sep	20.7	26.3	7.5	10.7	4.9	7.8	4.2	5.2	3.8	7.3	5.6
Week 35	28 Aug – 3 Sep	20.4	27.7	7.4	11.0	4.4	7.6	4.2	4.6	4.2	6.8	7.3
Week 34	21–27 Aug	20.4	28.6	7.6	10.8	4.2	7.5	4.1	4.5	4.3	6.2	8.2
Week 33	14–20 Aug	20.5	28.6	7.4	10.7	4.5	7.6	4.1	4.8	4.3	5.6	8.1
Week 32	7–13 Aug	21.0	29.6	7.1	10.4	4.5	7.2	3.9	4.2	4.5	5.7	8.6
Week 31	31 Jul – 6 Aug	21.4	30.1	7.4	10.3	4.4	7.1	3.8	4.0	4.5	4.9	8.7
2019 election	9 Sep	24.8	20.1	14.4	8.2	6.8	6.1	4.0	3.9	3.8	7.9	4.7

== Results ==
=== Municipal elections ===
==== Nationwide results ====
The results listed below are preliminary results, with 100.0% of the vote counted as of 12:40 CEST, according to Norwegian election authorities. Preliminary result and turnout figures do not necessarily reflect the final result.

Party	Votes	%	Seats	+/–
Conservative Party	675,718	25.88	1,717	+229
Labour Party	565,253	21.65	2,023	–560
Progress Party	297,289	11.39	948	+247
Centre Party	212,918	8.16	1,274	–991
Socialist Left Party	177,298	6.79	484	+29
Liberal Party	129,901	4.98	280	+16
Green Party	107,877	4.13	157	–153
Christian Democratic Party	103,623	3.97	359	–52
Red Party	90,801	3.48	192	–1
Industry and Business Party	79,996	3.06	241	+241
Pensioners' Party	39,035	1.50	84	+24
Norway Democrats	13,110	0.50	10	0
Conservative	12,178	0.47	14	+8
The Centre	11,086	0.42	7	+7
Capitalist Party	4,607	0.18	0	0
People's Party	4,517	0.17	0	–51
Communist Party of Norway	1,118	0.04	0	0
Alliance	990	0.04	–	0
Coastal Party	558	0.02	1	–10
Health Party	478	0.02	0	0
Árja	154	0.01	0	0
Sámi People's Party	136	0.01	0	–9
Others	82,039	3.14	0	0
Total	2,610,680	100.00	7,791	0
Valid votes	2,610,680	98.84		
Invalid/blank votes	30,523	1.16		
Total votes	2,641,203	100.00		
Registered voters/turnout	4,341,516	60.84		

==== Results in the most populous municipalities ====
County	Municipality	Population	Mayor before election	Mayor after election					
County	Municipality	Population	Mayor before election	Mayor after election	Oslo	Oslo	709,037	Raymond Johansen (Ap) (Note: Raymond Johansen of Oslo and Rune Bakervik of Bergen serve as "governing mayor", leading their city-municipalities under a different administrative model than most other municipalities; meanwhile, the "mayor" of these cities takes on a more bureaucratic-administrative role. The mayor of Oslo is Marianne Borgen and the mayor of Bergen is Linn Engø.)	Eirik Lae Solberg (H)
Vestland	Bergen	289,330	Rune Bakervik (Ap)	Christine B. Meyer (H)					
Trøndelag	Trondheim	212,660	Rita Ottervik (Ap)	Kent Ranum (H)					
Rogaland	Stavanger	146,011	Kari Nessa Nordtun (Ap)	Sissel Knutsen Hegdal (H)					
Akershus	Bærum	129,874	Lisbeth Hammer Krog (H)	Lisbeth Hammer Krog (H)					
Agder	Kristiansand	115,569	Jan Oddvar Skisland (Ap)	Mathias Bernander (H)					
Buskerud	Drammen	103,291	Monica Myrvold Berg (Ap)	Kjell Arne Hermansen (H)					
Akershus	Asker	97,784	Lene Conradi (H)	Lene Conradi (H)					
Akershus	Lillestrøm	91,515	Jørgen Vik (Ap)	Kjartan Berland (H)					
Østfold	Fredrikstad	84,444	Siri Martinsen (Ap)	Arne Sekkelsten (H)					

=== County elections ===
==== Nationwide results ====
Party	Votes	%	Seats	+/–
Conservative Party	538,861	25.51	163	+56
Labour Party	460,771	21.81	153	+5
Progress Party	263,268	12.46	87	+32
Centre Party	182,391	8.63	61	–55
Socialist Left Party	131,618	6.23	43	+9
Christian Democratic Party	94,063	4.45	29	+4
Industry and Business Party	91,445	4.33	30	+30
Liberal Party	82,148	3.89	25	+9
Green Party	78,017	3.69	24	–12
Red Party	74,305	3.52	25	+5
Pensioners' Party	39,257	1.86	9	+3
Conservative	14,737	0.70	1	0
Norway Democrats	13,576	0.64	0	–3
The Centre	8,133	0.38	0	0
Nordkalottfolket	7,951	0.38	8	+7
Capitalist Party	5,302	0.25	0	0
Bergen List	4,912	0.23	1	0
People's Party	4,010	0.19	0	–13
Others	17,805	0.84	5	+1
Total	2,112,570	100.00	664	0
Valid votes	2,112,570	97.83		
Invalid/blank votes	46,829	2.17		
Total votes	2,159,399	100.00		
Registered voters/turnout	4,341,516	49.74		

==== Results by county ====
Old county	New county	County mayor before election	County mayor after election			
Old county	New county	County mayor before election	County mayor after election	Agder	Arne Thomassen (H)	Arne Thomassen (H)
Innlandet		Even Aleksander Hagen (Ap)	Thomas Breen (Ap)			
Møre og Romsdal		Tove-Lise Torve (Ap)	Anders Riise (H)			
Nordland		Kari Anne Bøkestad Andreassen (Sp)	Eivind Holst (H)			
Oslo		Marianne Borgen (SV) (Note: In her capacity as Mayor of Oslo, Borgen also serves as the capital's effective county mayor.)	Anne Lindboe (H)			
Rogaland		Marianne Chesak (Ap)	Ole Ueland (H)			
Troms og Finnmark	Finnmark	Ivar B. Prestbakmo (Sp)	Hans-Jacob Bønå (H)			
Troms og Finnmark	Troms	Ivar B. Prestbakmo (Sp)	Kristina Torbergsen (Ap)			
Trøndelag		Tore O. Sandvik (Ap)	Thomas Iver Hallem (Sp)			
Vestfold og Telemark	Telemark	Terje Riis-Johansen (Sp)	Sven Tore Løkslid (Ap)			
Vestfold og Telemark	Vestfold	Terje Riis-Johansen (Sp)	Anne Strømøy (H)			
Vestland		Jon Askeland (Sp)	Jon Askeland (Sp)			
Viken	Akershus	Roger Ryberg (Ap)	Thomas Sjøvold (H)			
Viken	Buskerud	Roger Ryberg (Ap)	Tore Opdal Hansen (H)			
Viken	Østfold	Roger Ryberg (Ap)	Sindre Martinsen-Evje (Ap)			

== Endorsements ==
=== National daily newspapers ===
Newspaper	Party endorsed
Aftenposten	Conservative Party
Aftenposten	Liberal Party

== Donations ==
According to Statistisk sentralbyrå, a total of NOK 89.8 million in campaign contributions was raised by all political parties in 2023.

Party	Donations (NOK)
Conservatives	23,935,762
Labour Party	17,651,705
Progress Party	17,435,777
Socialist Left Party	7,958,578
Green Party	6,136,143
Centre Party	4,876,658
Red Party	3,725,091
Liberal Party	3,197,720
Christian Democratic Party	2,272,625

== See also ==
- Norwegian municipal elections
