= Timeline of Oslo =

The following is a timeline of the history of the city of Oslo, Norway.

== Prior to 1537 ==
- 1000 - St. Clement's Church built (approximate date).
- 1050
  - Oslo founded by Harald Hardrada (approximate date), according to Snorre's saga.
  - Mariakirken built (approximate date).
- 1070 - Catholic diocese of Oslo established (approximate date).
- 1080 (approximate) Old Aker Church erected (still existing)
- 1153 - Oslo Cathedral School established.
- 1240 - Battle in Oslo 1240
- 1290s - Akershus Fortress construction begins (approximate date).
- 1299 - Norwegian capital relocated to Oslo from Bergen.
- 1308 - Akershus fortress withstands attack by Duke Erik Magnusson
- 1314 - Haakon V of Norway declared that the provost of St Mary's church should be chancellor of Norway for ever (was abolished in 1679).
- 1349 - Black Death plague.
- 1352 - St. Hallvard's Cathedral and the other Sogne Churches are burned to the ground in a major fire.

== After 1537 ==
- 1537 - Reformation, Norway became a client kingdom under the Danish crown, most of the government administration moved to Copenhagen
- 1567 - city destroyed during Nordic Seven Years' War
- 1624 - 1624 Oslo fire; settlement relocated to newly founded "Christiania," "Oslo" remained the name of a village outside the city
- 1639 - Holy Trinity Cathedral (Oslo) built.
- 1641 - Gamle rådhus (town hall) built.
- 1643 - Printing press in operation.
- 1654 - Vaterland Bridge built.
- 1686 - Fire ruins ¼ of the city.
- 1697 - Domkirken (church) built.
- 1716 - City occupied by forces of Charles XII of Sweden.
- 1769 - first census held and recorded 7469 inhabitants
- 1771 - The first public theatre is inaugurated.
- 1780 - Deichman Library founded.
  - The Det Dramatiske Selskab is founded.

== 19th century ==
- 1811 - Royal Frederick University and Selskabet for Oslo Byes Vel (civic group) founded.
- 1814
  - Christiania became capital in the new state of Norway
  - University Botanical Garden (Oslo) established.
- 1815 Supreme Court of Norway established
- 1819
  - Morgenbladet (newspaper) begins publication.
  - Oslo Exchange established.
  - Børshagen (park) opens.
- 1827 - Nybrua (bridge) built.
  - The Strömberg Theatre is inaugurated.
- 1829
  - May: Battle of the Square.
  - J.W. Cappelens Forlag (publisher) in business.
- 1836 - National Gallery built.
- 1837
  - Christiania Theatre built.
  - Andreas Tofte becomes mayor.
- 1838 - Christiania becomes a municipality.
- 1841 - Akers Mekaniske Verksted in business.
- 1844 - Toftes Gave (orphanage) established.
- 1848 - Christiania Bank established.
- 1849 - Royal Palace inaugurated.
- 1851
  - "Cellular prison" begins operating.
  - Oslo host a nordic student meeting.
- 1852
  - Christiania Norwegian Theatre opens.
  - Oslo host a nordic student meeting.
- 1854 - Eidsvoll-Christiania railroad, the "Main Line", begins operating.
- 1855 - Population: 31,715
- 1857 - Den norske Creditbank headquartered in city.
- 1858 - 14 April: 1858 Christiania fire.
- 1860 - Aftenposten newspaper begins publication.
- 1863 - Murder of Knut Grøte occurs.
- 1866
  - District Court established.
  - Storting building (for parliament) constructed.
- 1868 - Norwegian Trekking Association headquartered in city.
- 1869 - Oslo host a nordic student meeting.
- 1872
  - Railway Drammen Line begins operating.
  - West Station built.
  - Aschehougs bokhandel (bookshop) in business.
- 1875
  - Horse-drawn tram begins operating.
  - Commerce School established.
- 1876 - Christiania Technical Evening School founded.
- 1878 - City expanded. Frogner, Majorstuen, Torshov, Kampen and Vålerenga are populated and rebuilt.
- 1879 -Husebyrennet ski race held first time
- 1881 - May: Wergeland monument unveiled in Eidsvolls plass.
- 1885
  - 26 February: 1885 speed skating race at Frognerkilen takes place.
  - Folkeakademiet founded.
- 1892 - Holmenkollbakken (ski jump) built, Husebyrennet became Holmenkollen Ski Festival.
- 1894 - Electric tram begins operating.
- 1897 - Centralteatret opens.
- 1898 - Tram Holmenkollen Line begins operating.
- 1899 - Nationaltheateret (theatre) built.
- 1900 - Postage meter (machine) introduced.

== 20th century ==
- 1901 - Nobel Peace Prize ceremony begins.
- 1904 - Norwegian Nobel Institute established.
- 1905 - Haakon VII became first king of independent Norway
- 1907 - Norwegian School of Theology established.
- 1908 - Oslo Chamber of Commerce established.
- 1910 - Population: 241,834.
- 1912 - Kjeller Airport begins operating.
- 1913 - Det Norske Teatret opened
- 1914 - 1914 Jubilee Exhibition held.
- 1916 - City Parks Department established.
- 1920 - Synagogue built.
- 1925 - City renamed "Oslo," the "Oslo" suburb renamed "Old Town" (Gamlebyen)
- 1926 - Ankerbrua (bridge) rebuilt.
- 1928
  - Underground Oslo Metro begins operating.
  - Ulvøybrua (bridge) built.
- 1929
  - Det Nye Teater opens.
  - Eldorado Cinema (Oslo) in business.
- 1932 - Oslo breakfast introduced in schools.
- 1934
  - Railway Sognsvann Line begins operating.
  - Saga Kino (cinema) opens.
- 1940 - 9 April: German occupation begins, King and cabinet escaped
- 1941
  - September: Milk strike occurs.
  - Bredtvet concentration camp in operation.
- 1942
  - 25 September: Oslo Mosquito raid by British forces.
  - 26 November: Norwegian Jews deported to Auschwitz from Oslo harbour
- 1943 - 19 December: 1943 Filipstad explosion.
- 1944 - Monolitten (sculpture) unveiled in Frogner Park.
- 1945
  - 8 May German capitulation
  - 7 June King Haakon returned to Oslo and Allied occupation ended
- 1946
  - Armed Forces Museum (Norway) established.
  - Population: 417,238.
- 1948 - Aker becomes part of city.
- 1950 - Oslo City Hall completed after 19 years construction.
- 1952 - February: 1952 Winter Olympics held in Oslo.
- 1954 - Monolittrennet (ski race) begins.
- 1959
  - Peace Research Institute Oslo founded.
  - Sagkrakken Bridge built.
- 1963
  - Club 7 active.
  - Munch Museum opens.
- 1972 - Fiskevollen Bridge built.
- 1973 - Oslo Airport location controversy.
- 1977 - Oslo Concert Hall opens.
- 1980
  - Norwegian Institute for Defence Studies established.
  - Oslo Central Station, Nationaltheatret Station, and Oslo Tunnel open.
- 1982 - Blitz (movement) begins.
- 1990
  - Oslo Spektrum (arena) opens.
  - Festningstunnelen opened
- 1992
  - Oslo byarkiv (city archives) established.
  - Ann-Marit Sæbønes becomes mayor.
- 1993
  - Israeli-Palestinian peace negotiations ("Oslo Accords") take place in Oslo.
  - Islamic Council Norway headquartered in city.
- 1994
  - Oslo Courthouse built.
  - Stenersen Museum opens.
- 1995
  - Lodalsbruene (bridge) built.
  - Per Ditlev-Simonsen becomes mayor.
- 1996 - Oslo hosts the Eurovision Song Contest 1996.
- 1998
  - Rikshospitalet (hospital) opens.
  - Oslo Airport opens.
  - Railway Gardermoen Line begins operating.
- 2000 - City celebrates thousand-year jubilee.

== 21st century ==
- 2001 - January: Demonstration following Hermansen murder.
- 2002
  - June: World Bank Oslo 2002 Protests.
  - Population: 516,467 city; 783,829 metro.
- 2003
  - Oslo Bysykkel (bikeshare) begins operating.
- 2004
  - 22 August: Robbery takes place at the Munch Museum.
  - Rabita-moskeen (mosque) established.
- 2006 - Central Jamaat-e Ahl-e Sunnat (mosque) opens.
- 2007 - Fabian Stang becomes mayor.
- 2008 - Oslo Opera House opens.
- 2009 - Stian Berger Røsland becomes governing mayor.
- 2010 - Oslo hosts the Eurovision Song Contest 2010.
- 2011
  - FIS Nordic World Ski Championships 2011
  - 22 July: 2011 Norway attacks, consisting of a bombing in Regjeringskvartalet, and a massacre on the nearby Utøya island, causing 77 deaths combined (67 from the massacre, 7 from the bombing, and 2 indirectly).
  - Akrobaten (bridge) and Nordenga Bridge built.
- 2012 - 16 April: Breivik trial begins.
- 2014
  - March: Bid for the 2022 Winter Olympics submitted.
  - Future Library organized.
  - Population: 647,676 city; 942,084 metro.
- 2015
  - September: 2015 Oslo municipal election held.
  - 22 July Information Center opens.
- 2018
  - December: The city's urban area passed one million people for the first time.
- 2022
  - June: A terrorist mass shooting occurs in Oslo, killing two and injuring 21.

== See also ==
- Oslo history with brief timeline of major events
- Timeline of transport in Oslo
- Other names of Oslo
- Timelines of other cities in Norway: Bergen
- List of years in Norway

== Bibliography ==
Published in the 19th century

- David Brewster, ed. (1830). "Christiania". Edinburgh Encyclopædia. Edinburgh: William Blackwood.
- John Thomson (1845), "Christiania", New Universal Gazetteer and Geographical Dictionary, London: H.G. Bohn
- George Henry Townsend (1867), "Christiania", A Manual of Dates (2nd ed.), London: Frederick Warne & Co. – via Internet Archive
- William Henry Overall, ed. (1870). "Christiania". Dictionary of Chronology. London: William Tegg. hdl:2027/uc2.ark:/13960/t9m32q949 – via HathiTrust.
- "Description of Christiania". Traveler's Guide in Sweden and the Most Interesting Places in Norway. Stockholm: Adolf Bonnier. 1871.
- "Christiania". Norway: illustrated handbook for travellers. Christiania: Chr. Tønsberg. 1875. hdl:2027/nyp.33433081580908.
- John Ramsay McCulloch (1880), "Christiania", in Hugh G. Reid (ed.), A Dictionary, Practical, Theoretical and Historical of Commerce and Commercial Navigation, London: Longmans, Green, and Co.
- "Christiania", Hand-book for Travellers in Norway (7th ed.), London: J. Murray, 1880
- Maturin Murray Ballou (1887), "Capital of Norway", Due North; or, Glimpses of Scandinavia and Russia, Boston: Ticknor and Company
- Hunger. Knut Hamsun (1890). The ultimate book set in Oslo, "this wondrous city that no one leaves before it has made its marks upon him".
- Yngvar Nielsen (1894). Christiania and its environs: illustrated hand-book for travellers. Christiania.

Published in the 20th century

- "Christiania". Bennett's Handbook for Travellers in Norway. Cover title:Bennett's Norway. Christiana: T. Bennett & Sons. 1902. hdl:2027/uc1.31822038219101.
- "Christiania". Bradshaw's Through Routes to the Capitals of the World, and Overland Guide to India, Persia, and the Far East. London: Henry Blacklock. 1903.
- "Christiania" . Encyclopædia Britannica. Vol. 6 (11th ed.). 1910. p. 279.
- Benjamin Vincent (1910), "Christiania", Haydn's Dictionary of Dates (25th ed.), London: Ward, Lock & Co., hdl:2027/loc.ark:/13960/t89g6g776 – via HathiTrust
- Esther Singleton (1913), "City of Christiania", Great Cities of Europe, Garden City, N.Y.: Doubleday, Page
- The Big Foxhunt. Ingvar Ambjørnsen (1983). Set in the late 1970s, telling the story of a young hash dealer.
- Beatles. Lars Saabye Christensen (1984). About growing up in the 1960s.
- Shyness and Dignity. Dag Solstad (1994).

Published in the 21st century

- Mark Luccarelli; Per Gunnar Røe, eds. (2012). Green Oslo: Visions, Planning and Discourse. Ashgate. ISBN 978-1-4094-7351-0.
