= Reidar Bull =

Norwegian judge (1909–1994)

Reidar Friis Bull (7 May 1909 – 15 February 1994) was a Norwegian judge.

He was a son of Trygve Bull (1870–1958), brother of Trygve Bull and Brynjulf Bull and uncle of Bernt Bull. He married Eline Pedersen in 1945.

He finished his secondary education in 1927 and the cand.jur. degree at the Royal Frederick University in 1932. From 1934 to 1936 he was a junior solicitor for Emil Stang. He was also a member of the communist group Mot Dag. Bull also chaired the Norwegian Students' Society in 1940, and later the Socialist Jurist Association from 1948 to 1949 and 1961 to 1963.

After periods as secretary in the Ministry of Justice from 1936 to 1940 and the Ministry of the Interior, he was promoted to assistant secretary in the Ministry of Justice in 1945. In 1948 he became director of the Central Passport Office, then judge on Oslo City Court in 1952.

Bull was also a board member of the Norwegian Civil Service Union from 1948 to 1950, and chaired Statens ferieråd from 1954 to 1958.

He resided in Asker. He died in 1994.
