= Timeline of Bergen =

The following is a timeline of the history of the city of Bergen, Norway.

== Prior to 19th century ==
- 1070s CE – Bergen founded by Olaf Kyrre (approximate date).
- 1080 – Catholic diocese of Bergen established (approximate date).
- 1153 – Bergen Cathedral School founded.
- 1163 – Coronation of Magnus V of Norway.
- 1180 – St Mary's Church, Bergen built (approximate date).
- 1181
  - Battle of Bergen (1181) occurs.
  - First recorded historical reference to Bergen Cathedral.
- 1194 – 29 June: Coronation of Sverre of Norway.
- 1247 – 29 July: Coronation of Haakon IV of Norway.
- 1261
  - 11 September: Magnus-Ingeborg wedding party takes place in Haakon's Hall.
  - 14 September: Coronation of Magnus VI of Norway.
- 1280 – Coronation of Eric II of Norway.
- 1350s – Hanseatic merchants set up kontor in Bryggen.
- 1393 – Sacking of Bergen (1393).
- 1429 – Battle of Bergen (1429) occurs.
- 1531 – Christ Church, Bergen demolished.
- 1665 – 2 August: Naval Battle of Vågen occurs.
- 1684 – Birth of Ludvig Holberg, writer and poet.
- 1702 – Fire.
- 1721 – Peter Nørvig printer in business.
- 1769 – Population: 18,827.
- 1764 – End of membership of the Hanseatic League.
- 1794 – Foundation of the local branch of the theatrical society Det Dramatiske Selskab.
  - Birgithe Kühle publishes the magazine Provincial-Lecture.

== 19th century ==
- 1800 – The first theater, Komediehuset på Engen, is built.
- 1807 – Birth of Johan Sebastian Welhaven, "one of the greatest figures in Norwegian literature".
- 1825 – Bergen Museum founded.
- 1837 – Carsten B. Conradi becomes mayor.
- 1838 – Bergen Art Union founded.
- 1843 – Birth of Edvard Grieg, future composer and pianist.
- 1850 – Det norske Theater (Bergen) opens.
- 1851 – Bergen Steamship Company in business.
- 1853 – Stølen School established.
- 1855
  - Fire.
  - Bergens Privatbank and Bergen Mekaniske Verksted (shipyard) established.
- 1867 – Bergen kretsfengsel (prison) built.
- 1868
  - Bergens Tidende (newspaper) begins publication.
  - Christiestøtten (monument) erected.
- 1872 – Hanseatic Museum established.
- 1873 – Causative agent of leprosy, the bacterium Mycobacterium leprae, identified by Gerhard Henrik Armauer Hansen.
- 1875 – Population: 54,436.
- 1876 – Bergens Kreditbank established.
- 1882
  - Bergen Telefonkompani (phone company) begins operating.
  - Bergens Moralvernforening ("moral protection" group) founded.
- 1883 – Voss Line railway begins operating.
- 1887 – West Norway Museum of Decorative Art established.
- 1890 – Gulating Court of Appeal established.
- 1894 – Bergen Historical Society founded.
- 1900 – Population: 72,179.

== 20th century ==
- 1905 – Arbeidsstuer for barn i Bergen (teaching facility) established.
- 1909
  - Den Nationale Scene (theatre) built.
  - Bergen Kunsthåndverksskole (school) founded.
- 1910
  - Braille library established.
  - Population: 104,224.
- 1915 – Bergen Chamber of Commerce founded.
- 1916 – January: Bergen fire of 1916.
- 1917 – Grieg statue erected in Byparken (Bergen).
- 1919 – Protestant Dagen newspaper begins publication.
- 1920 – Bergenshalvøens Kommunale Kraftselskap (utility) established.
- 1927 – Bergensavisen newspaper in publication.
- 1929 – Grand Hotel Terminus built.
- 1930 – Chr. Michelsen Institute established.
- 1933 – Bergen Courthouse built.
- 1935
  - Fana Gymnas (school) active.
  - Asbjørn Stensaker becomes mayor.
- 1936 – Norwegian School of Economics established.
- 1944
  - 20 April: Harbour explosion in Bergen 1944.
  - 4 October: Bombing of Laksevåg near Bergen.
  - Submarine "Operation Guidance" occurs in harbour.
- 1945 – Nils Handal becomes mayor.
- 1946
  - University of Bergen established.
  - Forum kino (cinema) built.
- 1949 – Gamle Bergen Museum established.
- 1950 – Population: 162,381.
- 1955 – Medieval Bryggen inscriptions discovered.
- 1967 – Sister city relationship established with Seattle, USA.
- 1970
  - 29 November: Body of Isdal Woman found.
  - Population: 209,066.
- 1972 – Arna, Åsane, Fana, and Laksevåg become part of city.
- 1973
  - Vestlandets kunstakademi (art school) opens.
  - Eilert Eilertsen becomes mayor.
- 1974 – Bergen City Hall built.
- 1975 – Bergen Bank established.
- 1976 – Muslim Association of Bergen founded.
- 1979
  - Bergen byarkiv (city archives) established.
  - Bryggen designated an UNESCO World Heritage Site.
- 1982 – Studentradioen i Bergen (radio) begins broadcasting.
- 1986
  - 3 May: Eurovision Song Contest 1986 held.
  - Electronic toll collection introduced.
- 1992
  - TV 2 (Norway) begins broadcasting.
  - Islamic Cultural Centre established.
- 1996 – Bergen National Academy of the Arts established.

== 21st century ==
- 2001
  - Bergen Kunsthall (art space) active.
  - Population: 232,989.
- 2002
  - Hordaland Police District headquartered in Bergen.
  - Bergen Program for Transport, Urban Development and the Environment begins.
- 2005
  - 14 September: Hatlestad mudslide occurs.
  - Bergen City Museum foundation established.
- 2006 – 1 September: Musical group Rolling Stones perform.
- 2009
  - November: Gingerbread house sacked.
  - Bergensbanen minutt for minutt slow television programme created.
- 2010 – Bergen Light Rail begins operating.
- 2011 – Trude Drevland becomes mayor.
- 2015 – 2015 Bergen municipal election held.

== See also ==
- Bergen history
- History of Bergen
- List of mayors of Bergen
- List of cultural heritage sites in Bergen
- List of fires in Bergen
- List of monuments in Bergen
- List of years in Norway
- Timelines of other cities in Norway: Oslo

== Bibliography ==
in English

- W. Pembroke Fetridge (1883), "Bergen", Harper's Hand-Book for Travellers in Europe and the East (22nd ed.), New York: Harper & Brothers, hdl:2027/nyp.33433066588371.
- "Bergen", Hand-book for Travellers in Norway (8th ed.), London: J. Murray, 1892
- "Bergen" . Encyclopædia Britannica. Vol. 3 (11th ed.). 1911. pp. 772–773.
- "Bergen", Norway, Sweden, and Denmark, Leipzig: Karl Baedeker, 1912, hdl:2027/uva.x030531120
- United States Secretary of the Navy (1932), "Bergen Havn", Sailing directions for the southwest and south coasts of Norway, H.O.; no. 140 (3rd ed.), U.S. Govt. Print. Off., hdl:2027/uc1.31822033787201 (fulltext)

in Norwegian

- Bergens fundas, 1560
- Yngvar Nielsen (1877). Bergen fra de ældste tider indtil nutiden (in Norwegian). Christiania: C. Tønsberg.
- Henrik Jæger (1889). Bergen og Bergenserne (in Norwegian). Bergen: F. Beyer.
- "Skrifter Udgivne af Bergens Historiske Forening" [Publications of the Bergen Historical Society] (in Norwegian). 1895 – via HathiTrust. 1895-
- Norway. Statistisk sentralbyrå (1899). "Bergen". Norges officielle statistik (in Norwegian). Kristiania: Statistiske Centralbureau.
