= Bicing =

Bicycle sharing system in Barcelona, Spain

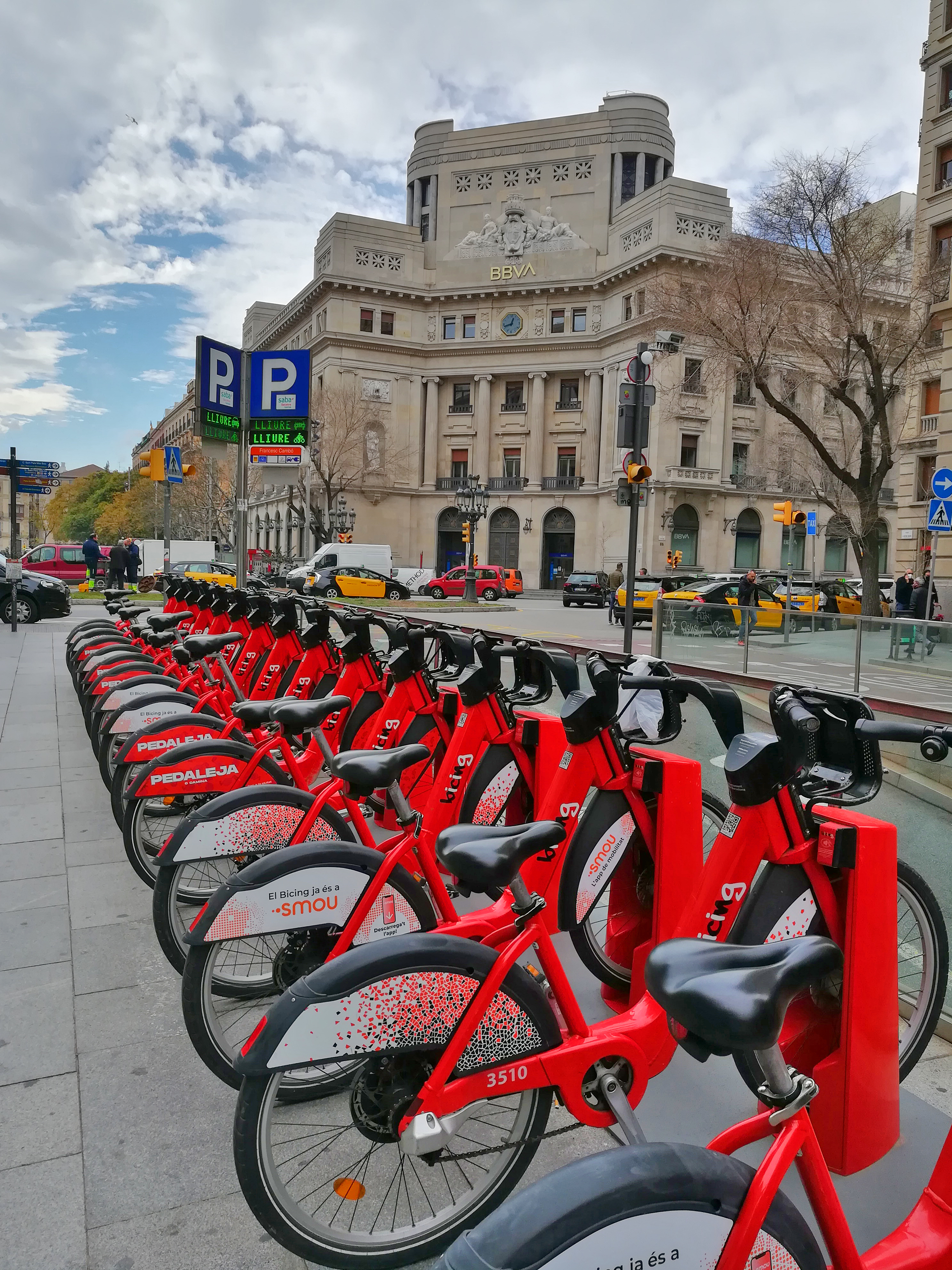
- Bicing station and bikes in Barcelona, 2021

Overview
- Owner: Ajuntament de Barcelona
- Locale: Barcelona
- Transit type: Bicycle-sharing system
- Number of stations: 420 (2014)
- Daily ridership: 28,093 (2014)
- Annual ridership: 10,113,500 (until October 2014)
- Website: bicing.barcelona

Operation
- Began operation: March 22, 2007; 19 years ago
- Operator: Clear Channel
- Number of vehicles: 6,000

Bicing (Catalan: [ˈbisiŋ], Spanish: [ˈbiθiŋ]) is a bicycle-sharing system in the city of Barcelona, Catalonia, Spain, which was implemented in March 2007, promoted by the City Council. The municipal company Barcelona de Serveis Municipals (B:SM) is the manager of the service, while the exploitation concession corresponds to Pedalem Barcelona since 2019, a Temporary Union of Companies formed by CESPA (Ferrovial Services) and PBSC. Between 2007 and 2018, Clear Channel was the company in charge of this task. It is similar to the Vélo'v service in Lyon or Vélib' in Paris, and uses the same bicycles and stations as used in Stockholm, Oslo, and Zaragoza. Its purpose is to cover small and medium daily routes within the city in a climate-friendly way, eliminating the pollution, roadway noise, and traffic congestion that motor vehicles create.

== Operation ==
As of 2021, the city council and Pedalem Barcelona manage and maintain the bike share system, provided by PBSC Urban Solutions, an international bike share company that provides bikes and stations. To use it, users must acquire a yearly membership. Currently the network consists of more than 519 stations to lend and return over 7000 bicycles distributed throughout the system.

The stations are situated through most of the flat areas of the city with a distance of around 300 to 400 metres between each one. Many are situated next to public transport stops to allow for intermodal use. Metro stations usually have signs pointing to the locations of nearest Bicing stations. The bikes can be borrowed from and returned to any station in the system, making it suitable for one-way travel. Each station has between 15 and 30 parking slots to hold and lock bicycles, but in highly transited areas many stations may be close together.

The Bicing user card, showing the logo

To take out a bike, users simply swipe the contactless RFID card at a docking station to identify themselves in the system, which then unlocks a bike from the support frame. Bicycles can be used for the first 30 minutes at no extra cost, with subsequent half-hour blocks (up to 2 hours) costing 0.70 € each. Use of a bicycle for more than 2 hours at a time is discouraged with a penalty rate of 4.20 € per hour, but also with the possibility of having membership cancelled after a certain number of uses in excess of two hours. To return a bicycle, users simply place the bike in a spare slot at a Bicing station; the bike is recognised automatically and is locked into place.

Specialised vans are used to redistribute Bicing bicycles between the stations to even out usage patterns. However, as of November 2007, the number and frequency of vans is not able to keep up during the peak hours, making it very difficult to find a spot at which to return the bike in some areas.

== Subscription ==
Use of the system is based on membership, and users can subscribe online or by visiting a service office. Bicing member cards are only sent to addresses in Catalonia in an attempt to prevent tourists from using the system. This limitation was imposed upon the city council by pre-existing local bike hire companies (grouped under Bicitours) that feared what they called illicit competition from the Bicing system. Bicitours and the city council agreed to enforce a block of ten minutes to change bikes (that is, when docking a bike, the user is prevented from leaving with another bike for ten minutes). As a result, tourists are barred from using what is officially denominated a "public transport system".

== Bicycle design ==
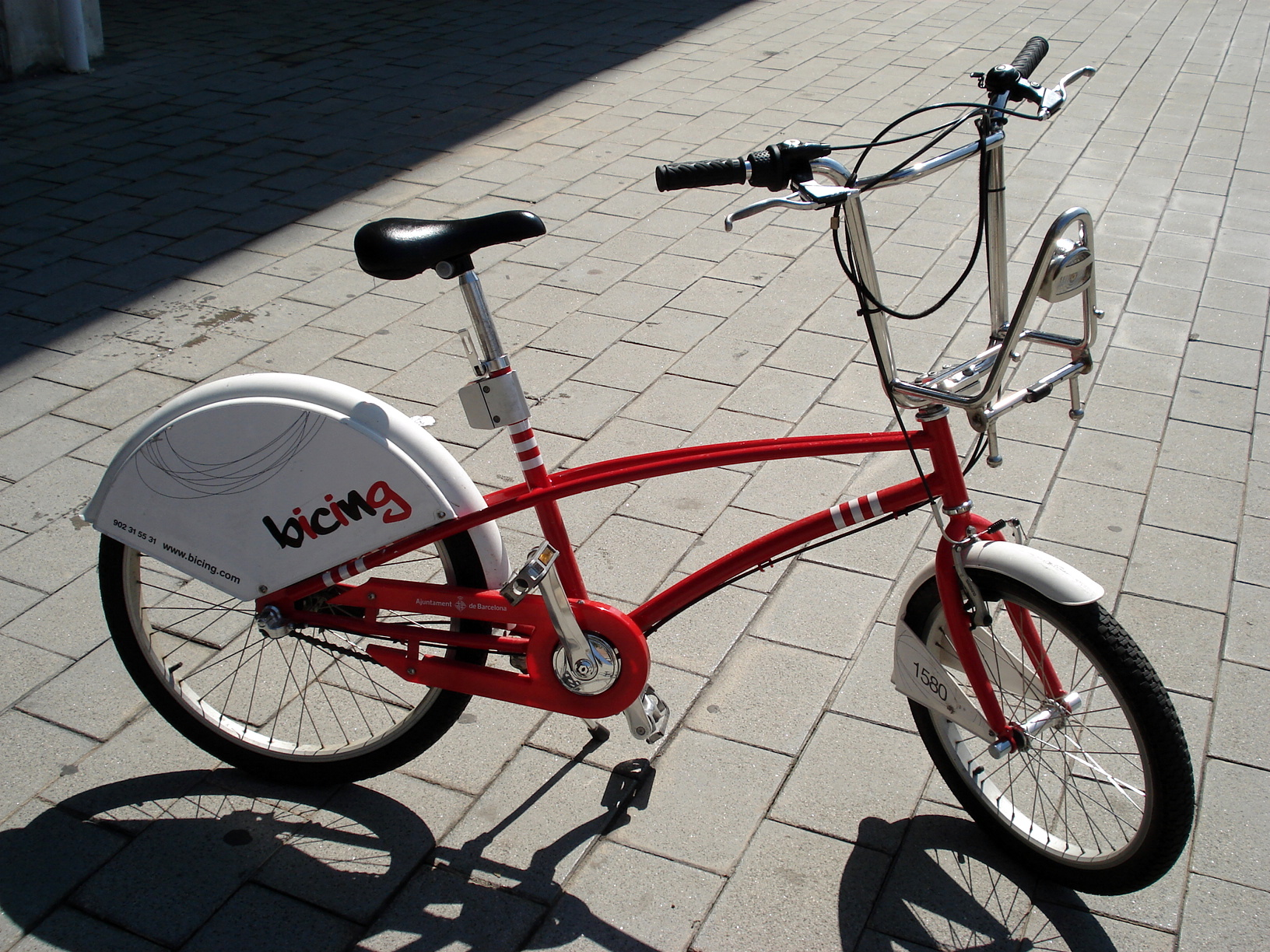
A Bicing bicycle, 2007

The bike is specially designed to prevent theft of parts, or of the whole bike, as well as to prevent vandalism. It is also designed to be easily recognised. However, common user complaints include missing bells, cut brakes, and poor maintenance. Bikes have sometimes been stolen, even by sawing the anchors that fix bikes on the stands, and found repainted.

== Stations ==
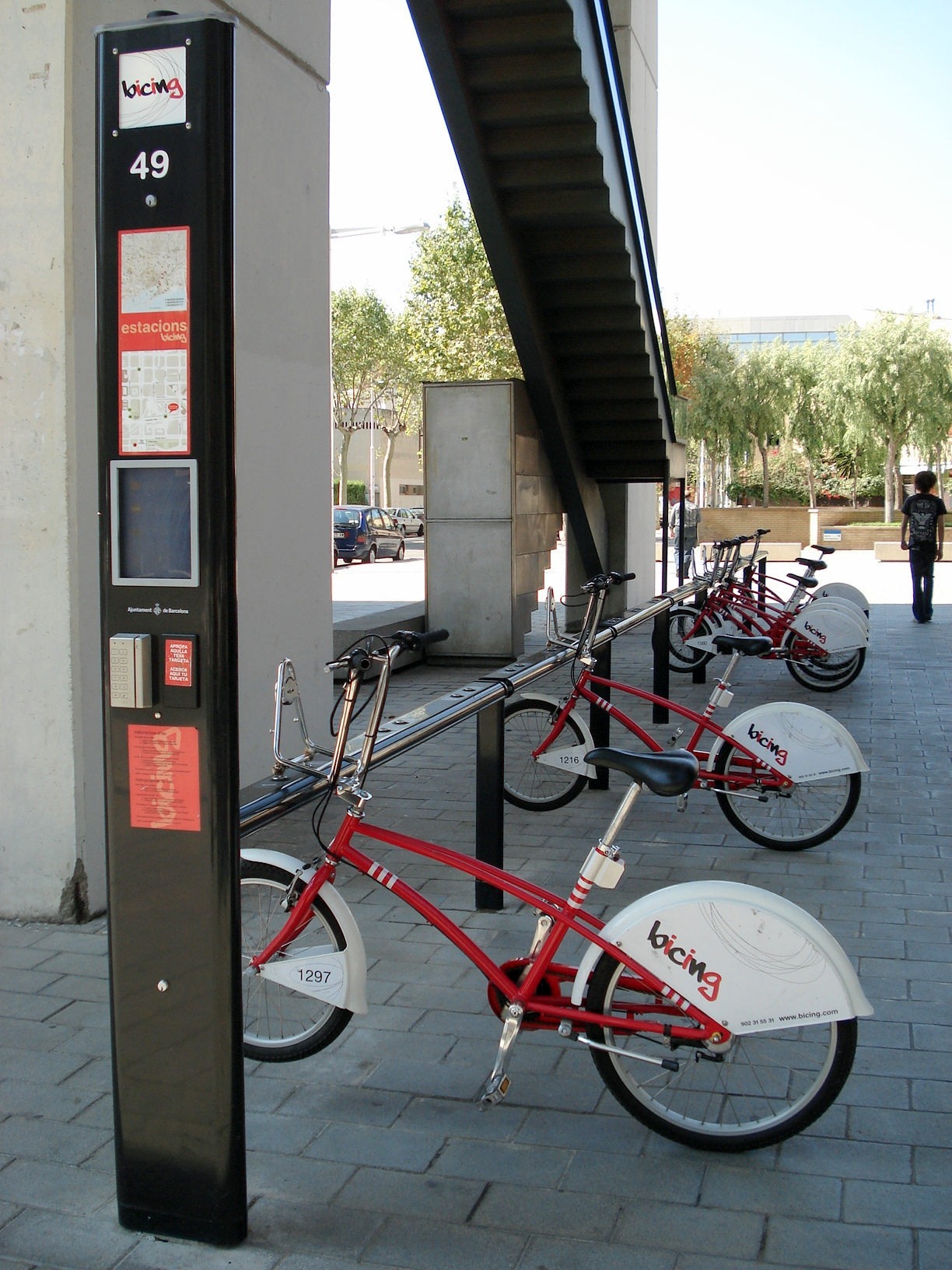
A Bicing station No. 49, 2007

Bike stations have generally replaced on-street car or motorcycle parking spaces, though others were placed in large pedestrian areas. Each station includes a long series of docks for bikes, with a computerized pylon at one end for completing transactions.

== Financing ==
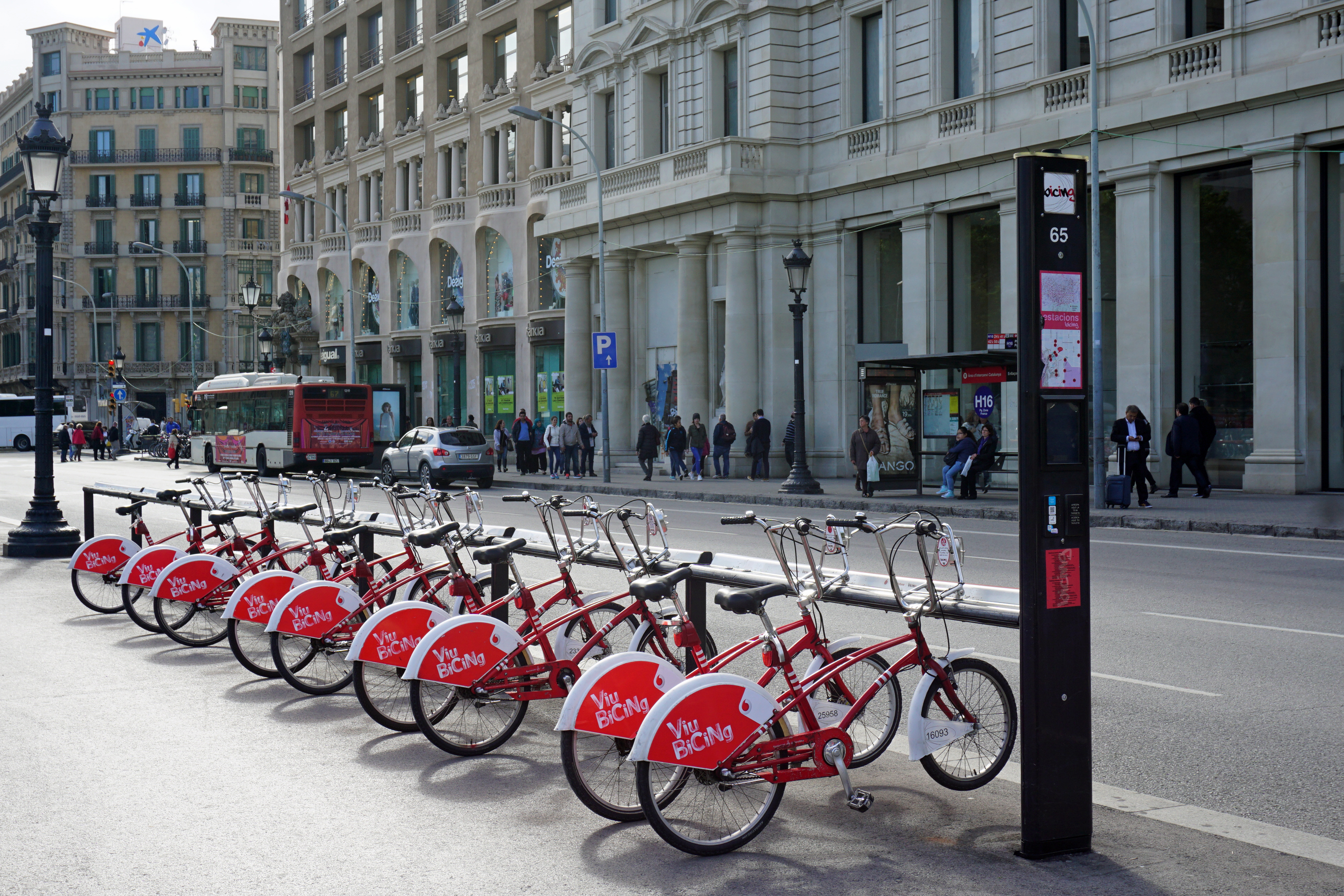
A Bicing station No. 65 with bikes, branded by Vodafone España, 2016

The system is paid for mostly by local car drivers with an on-street parking control system, distributed throughout much of the densely populated inner city. This money, about €2.23 million annually, is paid to the system operator. The yearly user fee is €47.16 with tax included, which makes it the city's cheapest public transport service. Recently the city made a sponsorship agreement with mobile operator Vodafone to feature the operator's logo on the system in exchange for €1.2 million a year.

== Usage statistics ==
Each individual bike is used between 10 and 15 times a day. More than 95% of rides in the system are shorter than 30 minutes. When a bicycle is returned, a user must wait 10 minutes before taking another one. Although there were over 90,000 registered users in September 2007 only one third of them used the system on a regular basis. As of November 2007 the system had been used more than 2,750,000 times, representing 8,000,000 km of travel.

== Planned future expansion ==
The bike-sharing system was received by residents with great enthusiasm, covering approximately 70% of the city area, including Ciutat Vella, the Eixample and some parts of Sant Martí and Gràcia. However, stations have not been placed in areas where the grade is greater than four percent, such as the hilly areas of Montjuïc and Tibidabo. Several neighboring cities have asked for the service to be extended to their cities as well, and studies are underway on how to implement this for the wider metropolitan area.

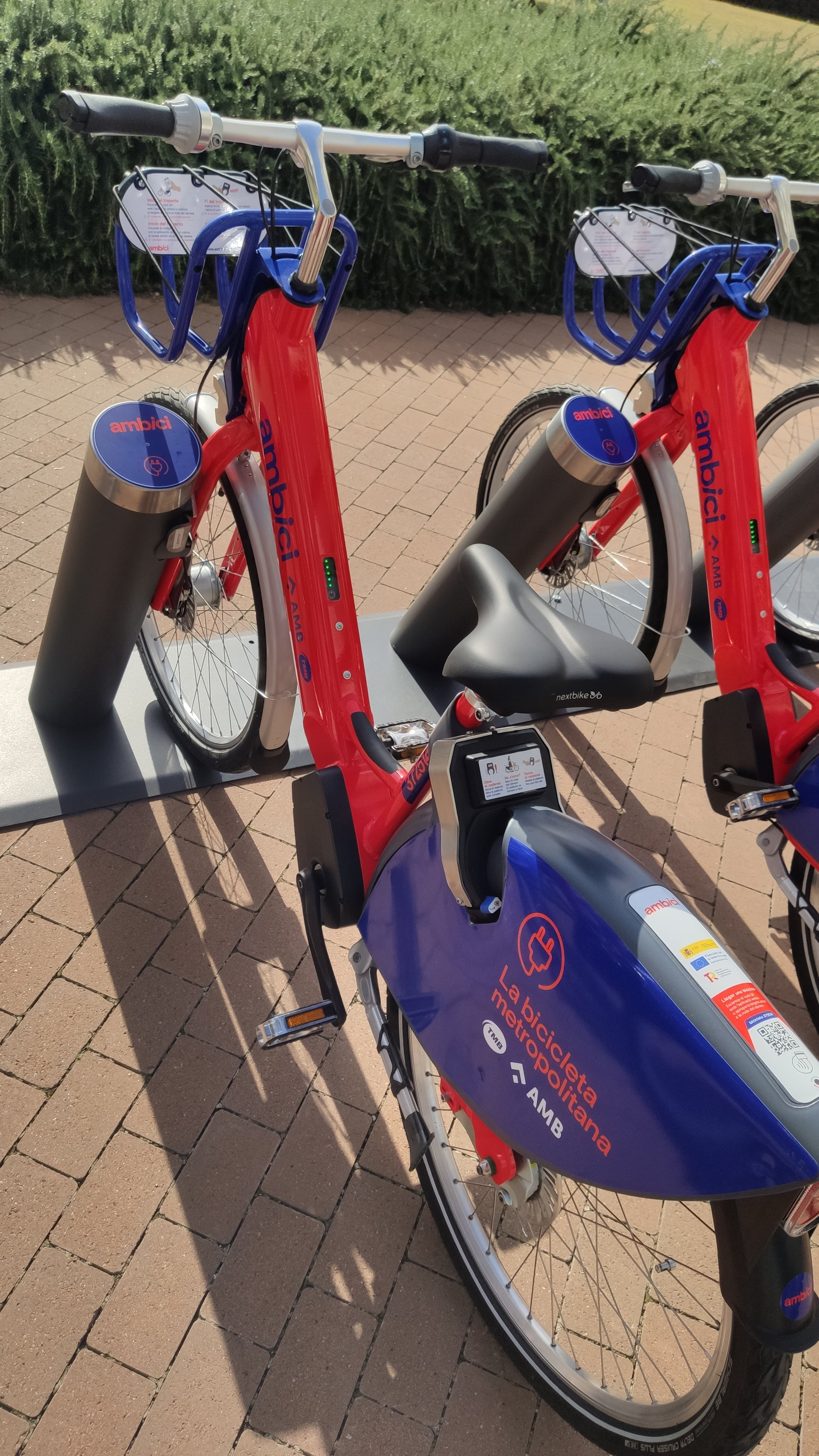
An AMBici bike at the station in Zona Franca, 2022

A parallel bike-sharing service, Ambici (stylized AMBici) was implemented in January 2023, serving the cities of Badalona, Castelldefels, Cornellà de Llobregat, Gavà, El Prat de Llobregat, Esplugues de Llobregat, l'Hospitalet de Llobregat, Molins de Rei, Sant Boi de Llobregat, Sant Feliu de Llobregat, Sant Joan Despí, Santa Coloma de Gramenet, and Viladecans. It is expected that, in 2029, both services unite.

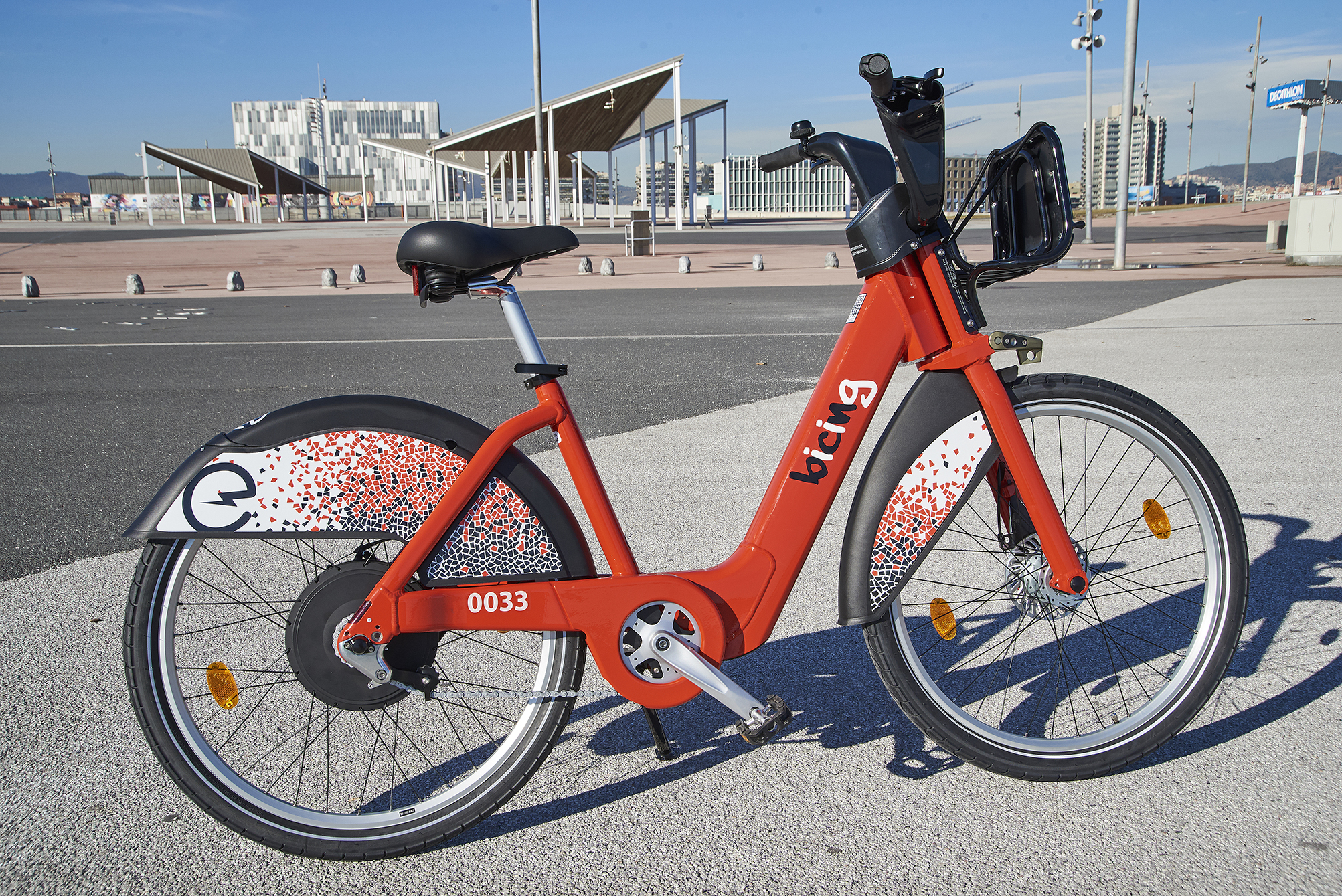
A Bicing electric bike by PBSC Urban Solutions, 2018

In 2019 the network started a large 7,000 bike expansion with pedal assisted bikes from Canadian firm PBSC.

== Name ==
The name is derived from bici, the Catalan and Spanish short-form for bicycle, and BCN, Barcelona's airport code and a popular abbreviation of its name. The English suffix -ing was also added, like the Spanish words footing (a pseudo-anglicism used for jogging), parking (car park), camping (campsite) and Vueling, which is a Catalan airline.

== See also ==
- Outline of cycling
- Utility cycling - Short-term hire schemes
- Urban planning of Barcelona
