= Peter N. Myhre =

Norwegian politician

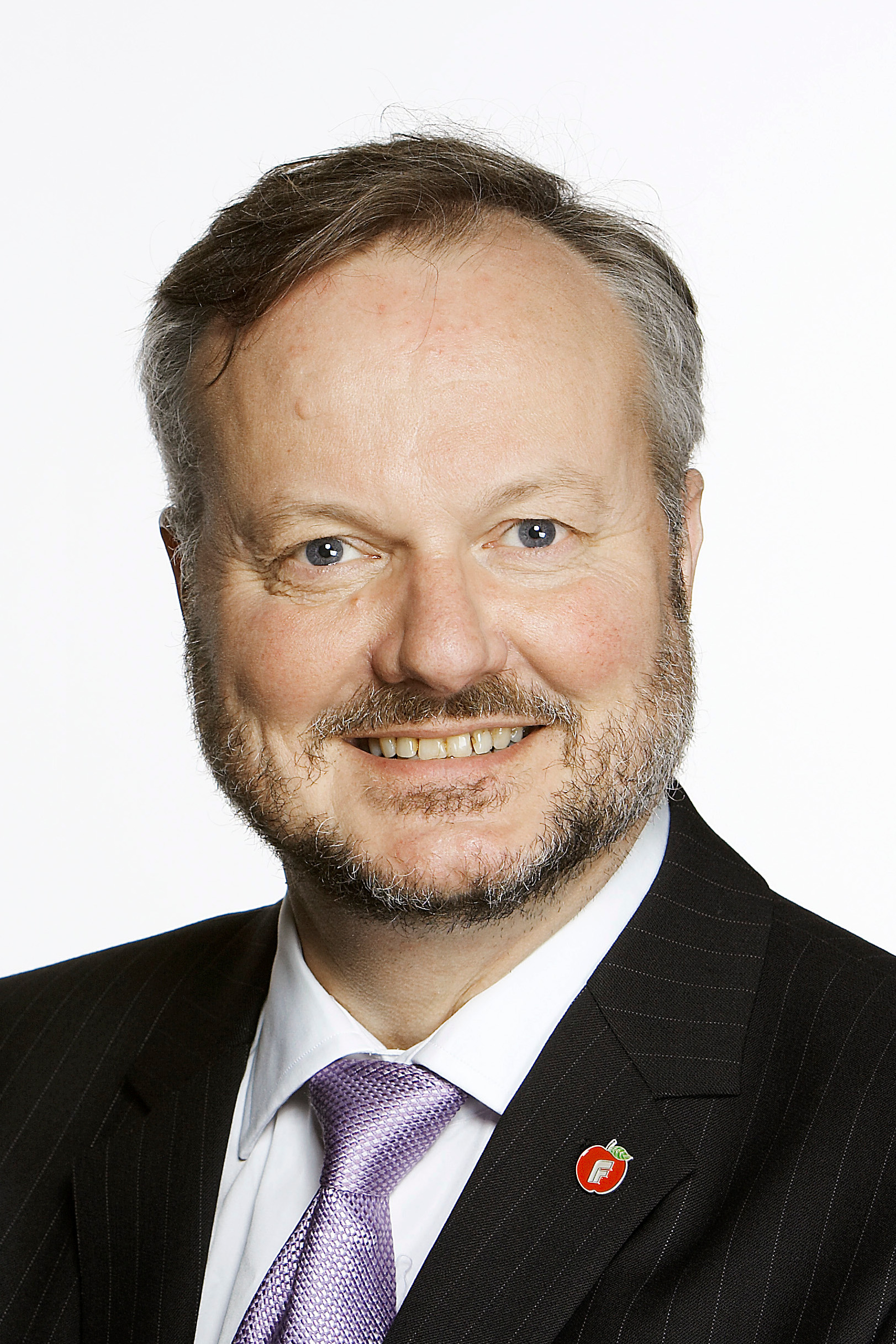

Mayor of Oslo
- In office 24 October 1990 – 31 December 1991
- Deputy: Leif Nybø
- Governing Mayor: Michael Tetzschner
- Preceded by: Albert Nordengen
- Succeeded by: Ann-Marit Sæbønes

Member of the Norwegian Parliament
- In office 1 October 2009 – 30 September 2013
- Constituency: Oslo

Deputy Mayor of Oslo
- In office 1 January 1988 – 24 October 1990
- Mayor: Albert Nordengen
- Preceded by: Thorvald Stoltenberg
- Succeeded by: Leif Nybø

Oslo City Commissioner for Transport and the Environment
- In office 29 October 2003 – 25 February 2009
- Governing Mayor: Erling Lae
- Preceded by: Hilde Barstad
- Succeeded by: Jøran Kallmyr

Leader of the Progress Party’s Youth
- In office 11 February 1978 – 11 March 1984
- Preceded by: Position established
- Succeeded by: Pål Atle Skjervengen

Personal details
- Born: 29 November 1954 (age 71) Oslo, Norway
- Party: Progress

Peter Nicolai Myhre (born 29 November 1954) is a Norwegian politician for the Progress Party.

== Early life and career ==
Myhre is the son of tobacco merchant Gunnar Peter Myhre (1909–1975) and Gunhild Nordlid (1914–2004). He married Marie Françoise Millou in 1985. He graduated from Ris Upper Secondary School in 1973, attended military academy in 1974, and studied Norwegian language at the University of Oslo until 1976. From 1966 to 1974, he worked for his family company Myhre Tobakk. He worked as receptionist, cleaner and then driver from 1973 to 1977, when he was hired as a secretary for the Progress Party. From 1978 to 1980, he was editor-in-chief of the internal party magazine Fremskritt. In 1987, Myhre had become owner and chairman of Cafe Rosted, which he kept until 1999.

== Political career ==
Myhre started his political career as board member of the Aksjon for Ny Politikk from 1972 to 1974. He was then the second deputy leader of the Reform Party from 1974 to 1976, and for the last year chair of its youth branch, Youth of the Reform Party. He was also, briefly, secretary-general of Moderat Ungdom. After the establishment of Youth of the Progress Party on 11 February 1978, Myhre was appointed as the youth wing's first leader, a position he held until 1984.

Myhre was elected to the Oslo City Council following the 1979 election, and re-elected in 1983. From 1982 to 1994 (except in 1991), he was leader for the Progress Party's council caucus. From 1988 to 1990 he was deputy mayor, and from 1990 to 1991, mayor. From 1992 to 1995, he was chairman of the municipal transport and environmental committee.

From 1995 to 1999, Myhre did not sit in the city council, but instead worked as a consultant, and later managing director of Norges Dagligvarehandels Forbund. During the four-year political sabbatical, Myhre was however a board member of the Oslo Port Authority. He was re-elected to the city council in the 1999 election.

In 2003, Myhre was appointed city commissioner for transport and the environment. After six year in the seat, Myhre decided to run in the 2009 Norwegian parliamentary election. He was placed third on the party ticket in Oslo, which is considered to deliver him a safe seat. He withdrew as city commissioner on 24 February to work full-time on the national elections, and was replaced by Jøran Kallmyr. He was a member of the Standing Committee on Foreign Affairs and Defence. After the 2013 election he reverted to being a deputy member of Parliament.

Political offices
Preceded by Albert Nordengen	Mayor of Oslo; 1990–1991	Succeeded by Ann-Marit Sæbønes
Preceded by Hilde Barstad	Oslo City Commissioner of Transport and the Environment; 2003–2009	Succeeded by Jøran Kallmyr
Preceded by Grete Horntvedt	Oslo City Commissioner of Urban Planning; September 2006–October 2006	Succeeded by Merete Agerbak-Jensen
Party political offices
Preceded by position created	Chairman of the Youth of the Progress Party; 1978–1984	Succeeded by Pål Atle Skjervengen
