= Henrich Herman Foss =

Norwegian military officer and elected official

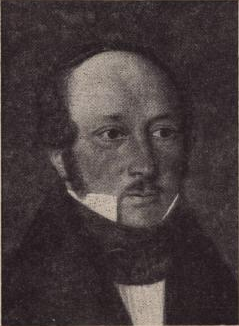

2nd Mayor of Oslo
- Incumbent
- Assumed office 1838
- Preceded by: Andreas Tofte

Personal details
- Born: 17 September 1790 Bergen
- Died: 21 September 1853 (aged 63) Aker, Norway

Henrich Herman Mejer Foss (17 September 1790 – 21 September 1853) was a Norwegian military officer and elected official.

== Biography ==
He was born in Bergen, Norway. He was the son of Jacob Finne Foss (1763-1822) and Margrethe Meyer (born 1763). He completed artillery exams in Copenhagen during 1811. He participated in the Gunboat War as artillery officer. In 1830 he became the military officer of charge in Christiania (now Oslo). In 1843 he became major and later colonel lieutenant and battalion chief. He eventually rose to lieutenant colonel in the Norwegian Army, a rank he acquired in 1843.

Foss was elected to the Norwegian Parliament in 1827 from the constituency Bergen, in 1830 from Moss, and from Christiania in 1833, 1836, 1839, 1842 and 1845. Foss was a member of the Norwegian-Swedish Union Committee (1841–44). He was a minister of government in the Ministry of Marine Affairs (1845–48) He was mayor of Christiania in 1838, 1840 and 1841.

Foss authored several publications, including Bergens Beskrivelse in 1824 (with Lyder Sagen), publications on politics as well as songs. Some of the songs were intended to celebrate the Norwegian Constitution Day, of which Foss was a proponent. He also proposed a Norwegian civil ensign during the personal union with Sweden.

Streets have been named after him in Bergen and Kongsberg as well as Herman Foss' gate in the district of St. Hanshaugen in Oslo.

Political offices
Preceded by Andreas Tofte	Mayor of Christania; 1838-1841	Succeeded by Christian Zetlitz Bretteville
