= Christian Zetlitz Bretteville =

Norwegian politician (1800–1871)

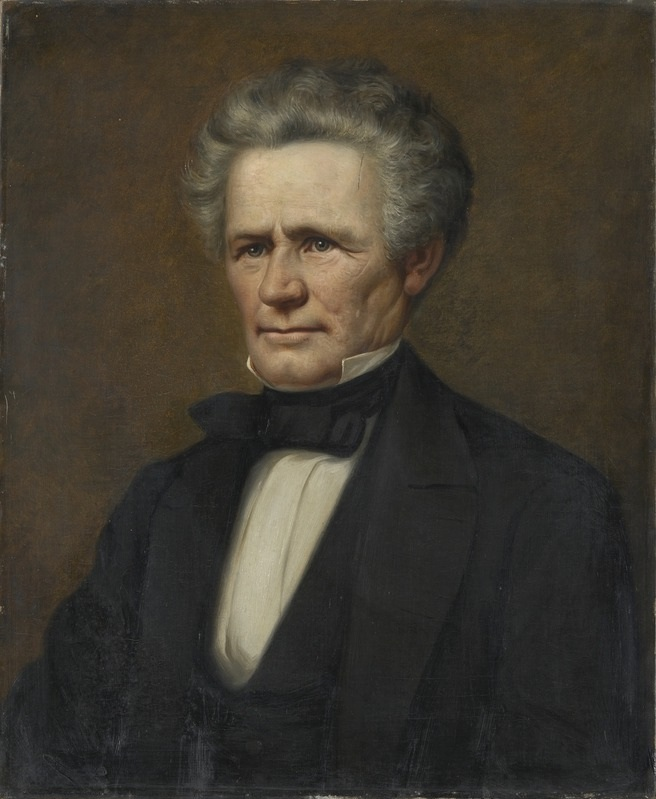
- Painting of Christian Zetlitz Bretteville by Knud Bergslien

Prime Minister of Norway
- In office 1858–1859
- Preceded by: Georg Christian Sibbern
- Succeeded by: Frederik Stang
- In office 1861–1861

Minister of Finance
- In office 1850–1852
- In office 1853–1854

Mayor of Christiania
- In office 1841–1841
- Preceded by: Herman Foss
- Succeeded by: John Iverssøn Randklev

Personal details
- Born: 17 November 1800
- Died: 24 February 1871 (aged 70)
- Occupation: Politician

Christian Zetlitz Bretteville (17 November 1800 – 24 February 1871) was a Norwegian politician who served as Prime Minister 1858–1859 and in 1861 and who held several other cabinet positions between 1850 and 1871. He was also mayor of Christiania.

== Political career ==
He was Minister of Finance 1850-1852 and 1853–1854, Minister of the Interior in six periods 1854–1871, as well as head of the Ministry of Auditing 1855-1856, a member of the Councils and interim Councils of State Division in Stockholm in several periods from 1852–1866, and as Prime Minister 1858–1859 and in 1861.

He was mayor of Christiania in 1841.

== Family ==
He belonged to the French Norman noble family le Normand de Bretteville, and was the son of tax collector in Paris and Brest Charles Eugene le Normand de Bretteville and Mette Christina Zetlitz. His grandfather, General and Marquis Louis Claude le Normand de Bretteville (1744–1835) fled the French Revolution and was naturalized as a Dano-Norwegian nobleman in 1804. His daughter Blanca Bretteville was married to the judge Johann Ludwig Wegner, a son of the industrialist Benjamin Wegner.

Political offices
Preceded by Herman Foss	Mayor of Christiania; 1841	Succeeded by John Iverssøn Randklev
