= List of mayors of Oslo =

Mayor of Oslo

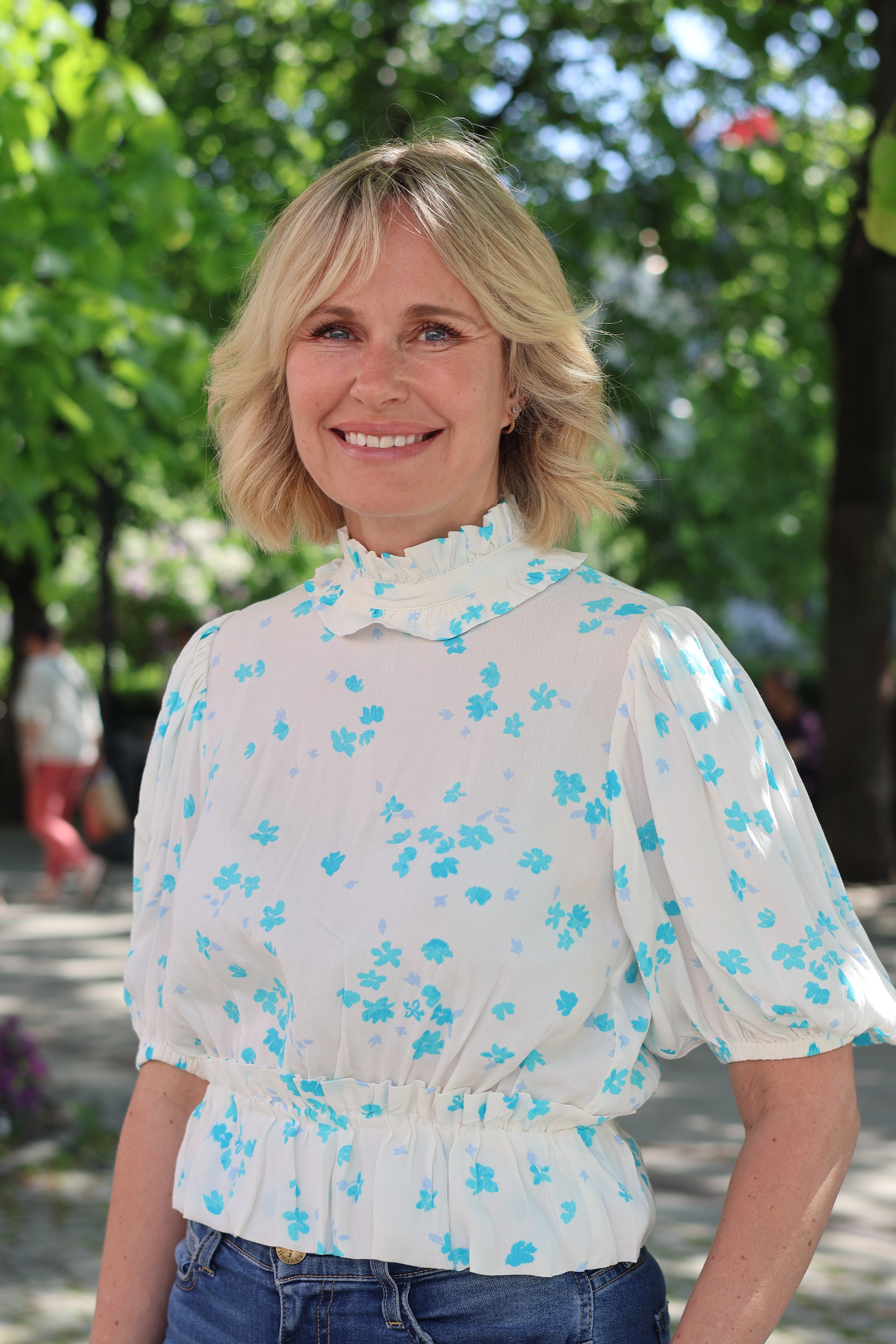
- Incumbent; Anne Lindboe since 25 October 2023
- Government of Oslo
- Style: The Honourable
- Status: Head of the City
- Seat: Oslo City Hall
- Appointer: Electorate of Oslo
- Term length: Four years, renewable
- Inaugural holder: Andreas Tofte
- Formation: 1837; 189 years ago
- Deputy: Julianne Ofstad
- Website: www.oslo.kommune.no/english/

The Mayor of Oslo (Bokmål: Oslos ordfører; Nynorsk: Oslos ordførar) is the chief executive of Oslo. The Mayor's office administers all city services, public property, most public agencies, and enforces all city and state laws within Oslo city.

== List of mayors of Oslo ==
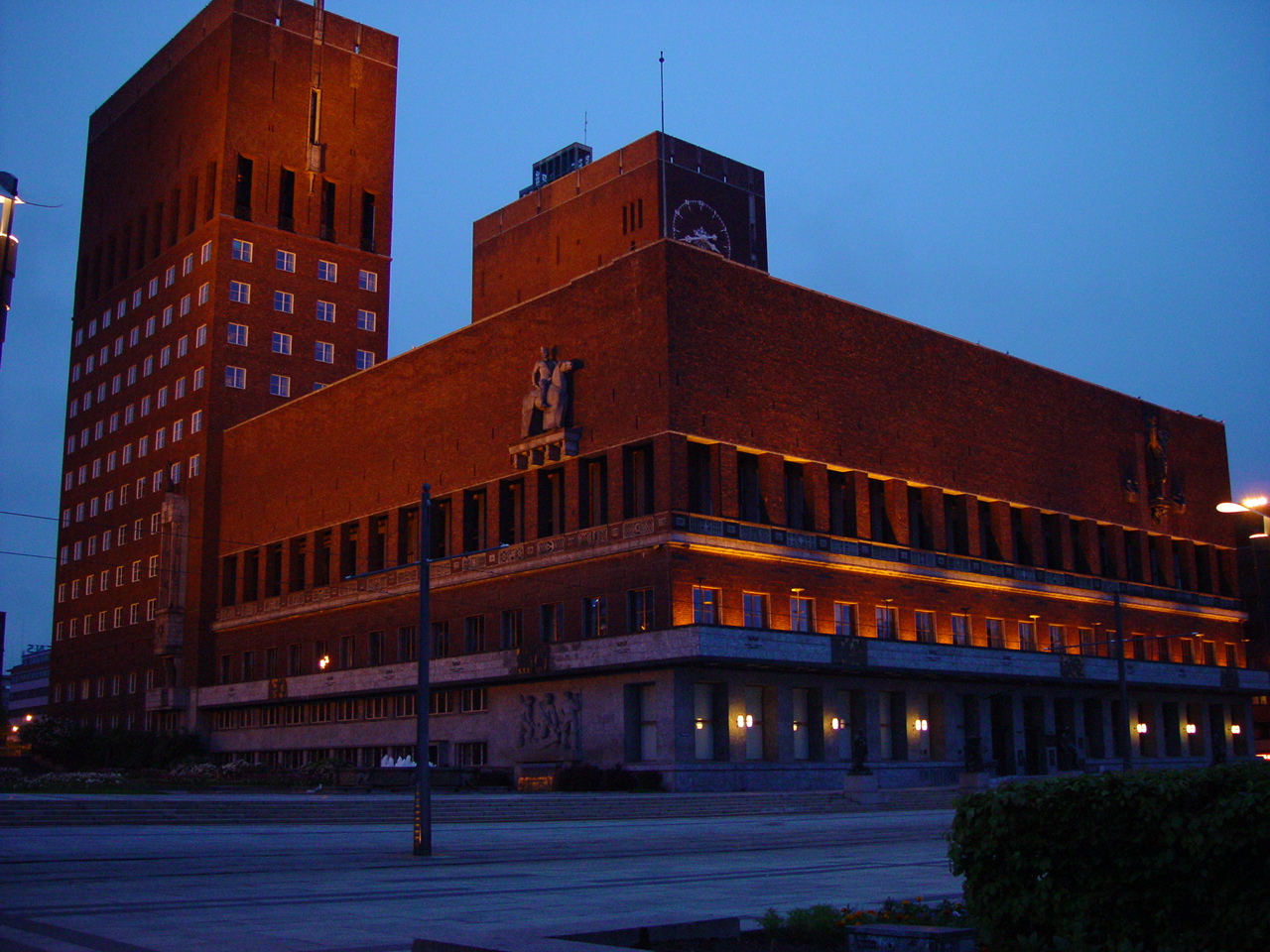
Oslo City Hall

This is a list of mayors of Oslo.

Term	Image	Mayor	Party
1837		Andreas Tofte	Independent
1838		Herman Foss	Independent
1839		John Iverssøn Randklev	Independent
1840–1841		Herman Foss	Independent
1841		Christian Zetlitz Bretteville	Independent
1842		John Iverssøn Randklev	Independent
1842		Ulrik Anton Motzfeldt	Independent
1842–1843		Erik Røring Møinichen	Independent
1843–1845		Carl Andreas Fougstad	Independent
1845		Lars Rasch	Independent
1846		Christian Birch-Reichenwald	Independent
1847–1852		Lars Rasch	Independent
1853–1860		Ulrik Anton Motzfeldt	Independent
1861		Frederik Stang	Independent
1862		Christian Birch-Reichenwald	Independent
1863		August Thomle	Independent
1864–1865		Christian Birch-Reichenwald	Independent
1866–1868		Carl Johan Michelet	Independent
1869–1876		Otto Joachim Løvenskiold	Independent
1877–1878		Anders Sandøe Ørsted Bull	Independent
1879–1880		Christian Homann Schweigaard	Independent
1881–1884		Anton Blumenthal Petersen	Independent
1885–1889		Christian Homann Schweigaard	Conservative
1889		Peter Birch-Reichenwald	Conservative
1889–1890		Karl Lous	Conservative
1891		Bernhard Getz	Conservative
1892		August Christian Baumann Bonnevie	Conservative
1893–1894		Evald Rygh	Conservative
1895		Fredrik Stang Lund	Liberal
1895–1897		Elias Sunde	Liberal
1898		Vollert Hille Bøgh	Liberal
1899–1901		Edmund Harbitz	Conservative
1902–1904		Jens Ludvig Andersen Aars	Conservative
1905		Johan Kristian Skougaard	Conservative
1906–1908		Fredrik Moltke Bugge	Conservative
1909–1910		Olaf Berg	Conservative
1910		Thomas Cathinco Bang, Jr.	Conservative
1911		Lyder Nicolaysen (1866–1927)	Conservative
1912–1914		Hieronymus Heyerdahl	Conservative
1915–1916		Peter Meinich	Conservative
1917–1919		Carl Jeppesen	Labour
1920–1922		Haavard Martinsen	Conservative
1923–1928		Borger With	Conservative
1929–1931		Adolf Indrebø	Labour
1932–1934		Eyvind Getz	Conservative
1935		Oscar Torp	Labour
1935–1936		Trygve Nilsen (while Torp was acting Minister of Defence)	Labour
1936		Oscar Torp	Labour
1936–1940		Trygve Nilsen	Labour
1940		Einar Gerhardsen	Labour
1940–1941		Rolf Stranger	Conservative
1941–1945		German occupation of Norway; Fritz Jenssen installed as mayor	Nasjonal Samling
1945		Einar Gerhardsen	Labour
1945		Rolf Stranger	Conservative
1945–1947		Arnfinn Vik	Labour
1948–1950		Halvdan Eyvind Stokke	Labour
1951–1955		Brynjulf Bull	Labour
1956–1959		Rolf Stranger	Conservative
1960–1961		Brynjulf Bull	Labour
1962–1963		Rolf Stranger	Conservative
1964–1975		Brynjulf Bull	Labour
1976–1990		Albert Nordengen	Conservative
1990–1991		Peter N. Myhre	Progress
1992–1995		Ann-Marit Sæbønes	Labour
1995–2007		Per Ditlev-Simonsen	Conservative
2007		Svenn Erik Kristiansen	Conservative
2007–2015		Fabian Stang	Conservative
2015–2023		Marianne Borgen	Socialist Left
2023–present		Anne Lindboe	Conservative

== See also ==
- Timeline of Oslo
