= H. E. Stokke =

Norwegian railway director and Mayor of Oslo

Halvdan Eyvind Stokke (20 November 1900 – 15 December 1977), birth name Halvdan Eyvind Johannessen, commonly known as H. E. Stokke was a Norwegian railway director and Mayor of Oslo.

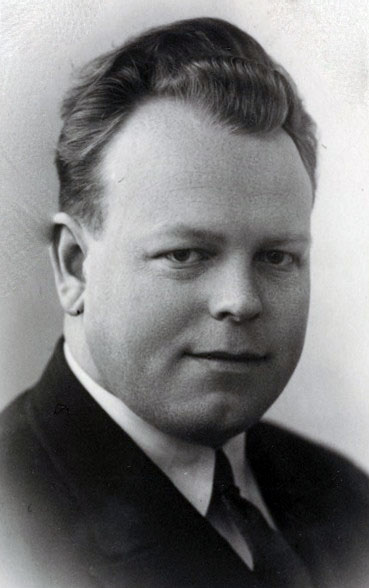
Halvan Eyvind Stokke

== Biography ==
He was born in Fredrikstad in Østfold to Anton Johannessen (1857–1936) and his wife Helen Anderson (1865–1944). In the 1920s, he studied telegraphy in Oslo and was employed at Telegrafverket from 1920 to 1945. From 1945 to 1948, he was State Secretary at the Ministry of Transport and Communications. He was employed as Director General of the Norwegian State Railways (NSB) from 1951 to 1966.

Stokke was a member of Fredrikstad city council 1928–29 and Aker municipal council 1932–1948. He served as mayor of Aker from 1946 to 1947. He continued as mayor of Oslo from 1948 to 1950 after Aker was incorporated into Oslo in 1948.

Preceded by Arnfinn Vik	Mayor of Oslo; 1948–1950	Succeeded by Brynjulf Bull
