= Brynjulf Bull =

Norwegian politician (1906–1993)

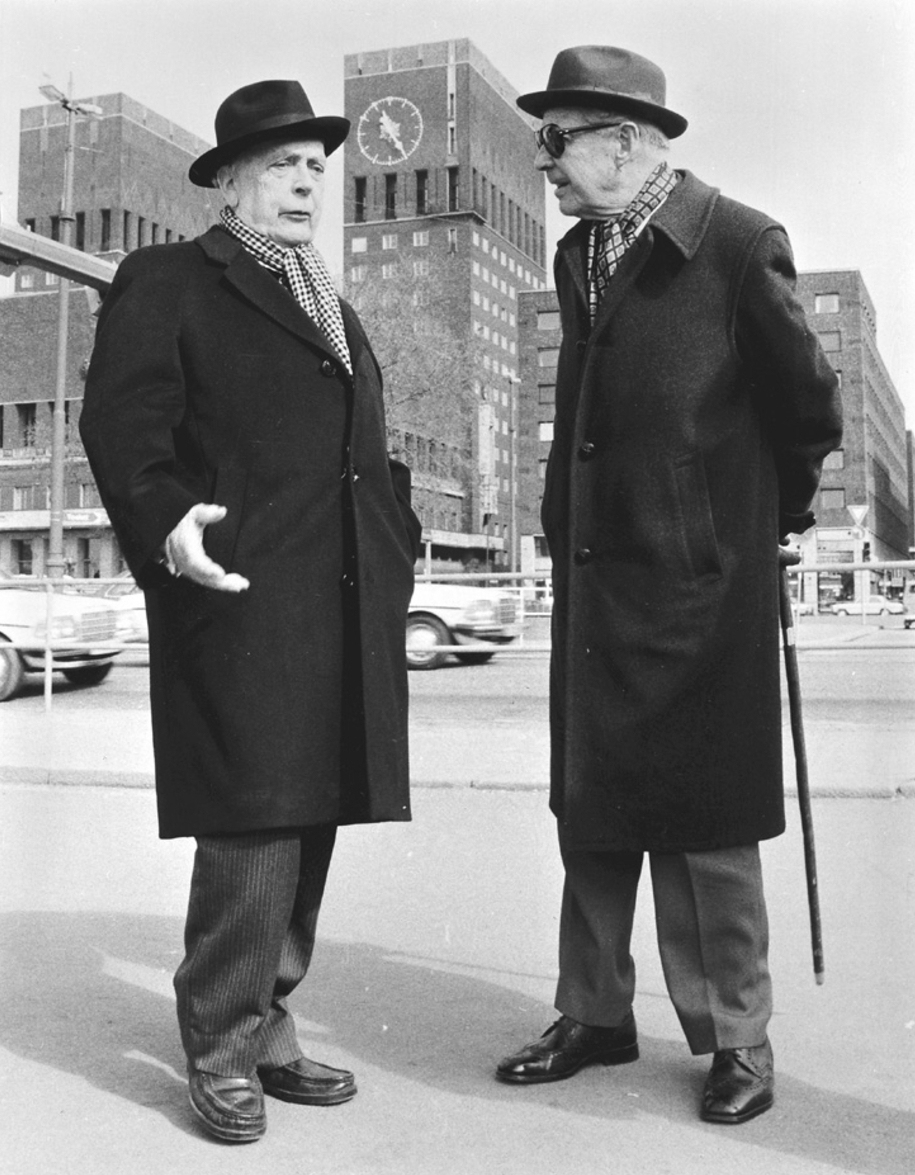
- Brynjulf Bull (left), with fellow former mayor of Oslo, Rolf Stranger (right) (1982)
- Born: 17 October 1906; Kristiania, Norway
- Died: 18 June 1993 (aged 86); Oslo, Norway
- Resting place: Vår Frelsers gravlund
- Education: University of Oslo
- Occupations: Politician, attorney
- Spouse: Ruth Bernhardina Øgrim (m. 1937)
- Children: Bernt Bull
- Relatives: Trygve Bull (brother)

Brynjulf Friis Bull (17 October 1906 – 18 June 1993) was a Norwegian lawyer, Supreme Court attorney, and Mayor of Oslo.

== Biography ==
Brynjulf Bull was born in Kristiania (now Oslo), Norway. He was one of three sons born to Trygve Bull (1870–1958) and Sally Friis (1875–1963). Bull was the brother of historian Trygve Bull. He was brought up at Groruddalen in the district of Alna in Østre Aker. Bull attended the Fru Nielsens Latinskole and took his examen artium in 1925 at Oslo Cathedral School. He studied law and attended Oxford University in 1926–1927. He graduated with a law degree in 1930.

Bull established his own legal practice in partnership with Aake Ording in Oslo during 1933. During the Occupation of Norway by Nazi Germany, he was arrested from October 1942 to February 1944. After the liberation of Norway, he was a district attorney for cases of treason from 1945–1947. He became a Supreme Court advocate in 1950.

Bull became a member of the Oslo City Council from 1946. He represented the Norwegian Labour Party for a number of years as Deputy Mayor and Mayor in Oslo in 1951–1955, 1960–1961, and 1964–1975. In 1966 he was a key figure in the resolution of the theater strike. Bull was the driving force behind, and the first chairman of the board in Oslo Konserthus. His long-term period of office in the Oslo City Council earned him the nickname "Sitting Bull".

Oslo's Brynjulf Bulls plass, in the eastern part of City Hall Square of Oslo (Rådhusplassen), was named after him. In 1976, he received the Medal of St. Hallvard, the highest honor of the City of Oslo. In 1961, he was awarded the Petter Dass Medal (Petter Dass -medaljen) for his active efforts in the reconstruction of the Northern Norwegian Student Foundation (Nordnorsk Student- og Elevhjem).

== Personal life ==
In 1937, he married Ruth Bernhardina Øgrim (1911–2005), sister of physicist Otto Øgrim (1913–2006). Bull was the father of Bernt Bull, former Norwegian State Secretary in the Ministry of the Environment and currently Senior Adviser in the Ministry of Health and Care Services. He died in 1993 and was buried at Vår Frelsers gravlund in Oslo.

Preceded by Halvdan Eyvind Stokke	Mayor of Oslo; 1951–1955	Succeeded by Rolf Stranger
Preceded by Rolf Stranger	Mayor of Oslo; 1960–1961	Succeeded by Rolf Stranger
Preceded by Rolf Stranger	Mayor of Oslo; 1964–1975	Succeeded by Albert Nordengen
