= Arnfinn Vik =

Norwegian politician (1901–1990)

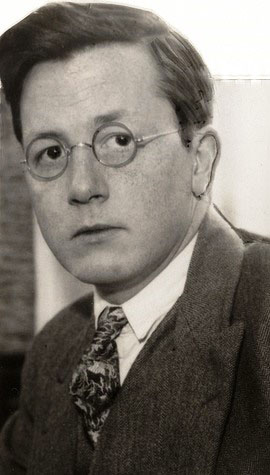
- Born: 20 May 1901; Drammen, Norway
- Died: 13 September 1990 (aged 89)
- Occupation: Politician

Arnfinn Vik (20 May 1901 – 13 September 1990) was a Norwegian politician who served as Mayor of Oslo.

He was born at Drammen in Buskerud, Norway. He participated in the Left Communist Youth League's military strike action of 1924. He was convicted for assisting in this crime and sentenced to 4 months of prison. He was secretary of the Oslo Labour Party in 1936 and was a member of the Oslo City Council from 1938.

He was a central resistance member during the occupation of Norway by Nazi Germany (1940-1945) and served as a leader of the Norwegian resistance group, Hjemmefrontens Ledelse. After the end of World War II, he served as mayor of Oslo from 1945 to 1947. He was later director of the Oslo housing authority (Boligforvaltning).

== Other sources ==
- Maurseth, Per (1987). Gjennom kriser til makt 1920-1935. Volume three of Arbeiderbevegelsens historie i Norge (in Norwegian). Oslo: Tiden. p. 502. ISBN 82-10-02753-0.

Preceded by Rolf Stranger	Mayor of Oslo; 1945–1947	Succeeded by Halvdan Eyvind Stokke
