= Fritz Jenssen =

Norwegian politician and banker

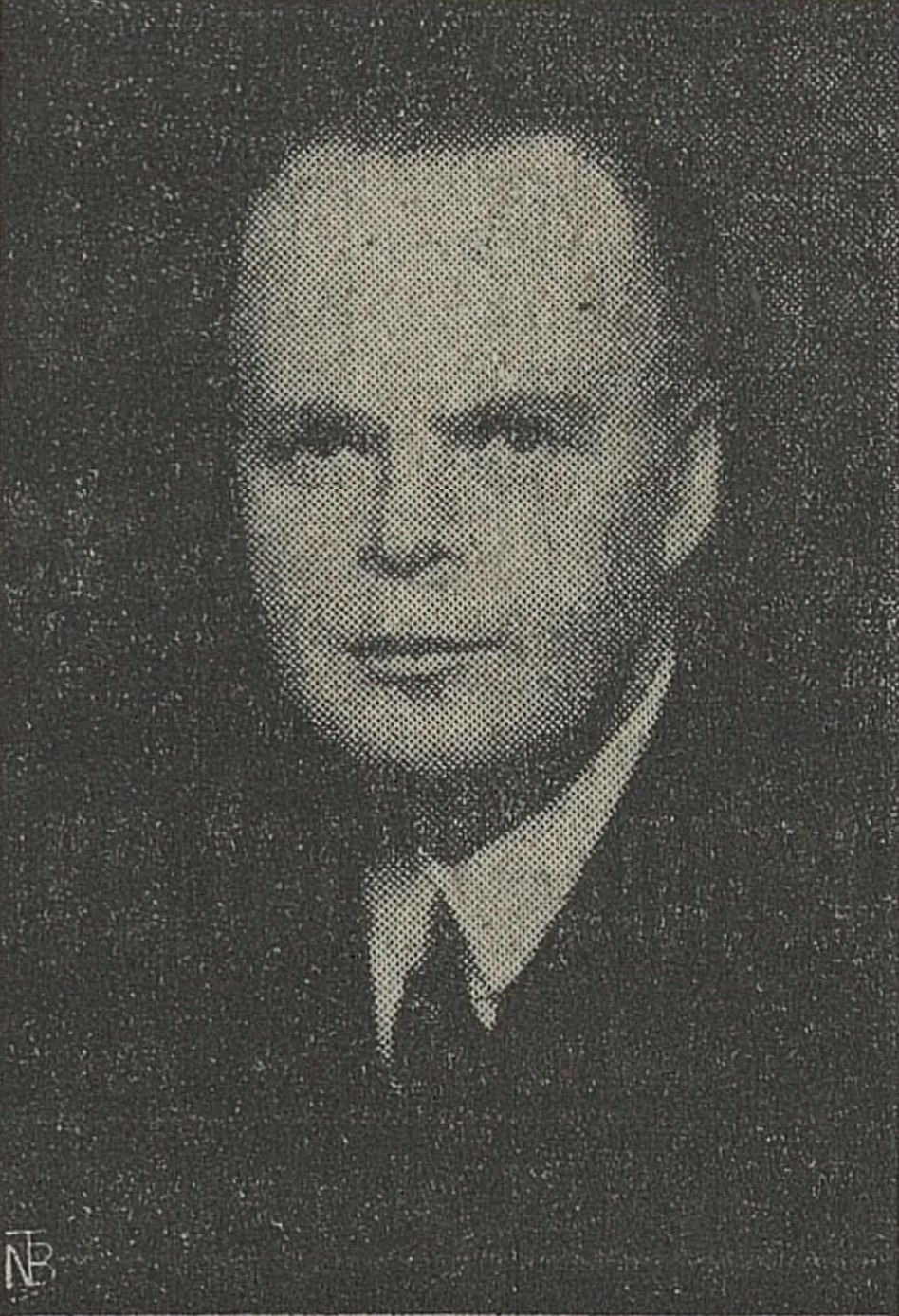
Fritz R Jenssen

Anton Tobias Friedrich "Fritz" Bühring Jenssen (10 June 1886 – 15 April 1966) was a Norwegian banker and politician for Nasjonal Samling.

He was born in Strinda Municipality as the eighth of ten children of wholesaler and politician Anton Jenssen (1850–1927). The older brothers Eivind and Erling entered the family company Jenssen & Co, but after Fritz finished his secondary education in 1905 he learned the banking trade in Trondhjem and abroad. He was hired in Christiania Bank og Kreditkasse in 1912, and after a period as a stock broker from 1915 to 1920 he became board secretary in Kreditkassen. In 1922 he was promoted to assistant manager which he remained until 1945.

In 1933 Jenssen joined the Fascist party Nasjonal Samling. He chaired its financial committee. He was also a board member of Leidangen in Oslo. During the occupation of Norway by Nazi Germany he was installed as mayor of Oslo from 1941 to 1945.

During the legal purge in Norway after World War II he was convicted of treason and sentenced to ten years of forced labour, but was ultimately released in 1949.
