= Oslo Bysykkel =

Public bycycle sharing system in Oslo, Norway

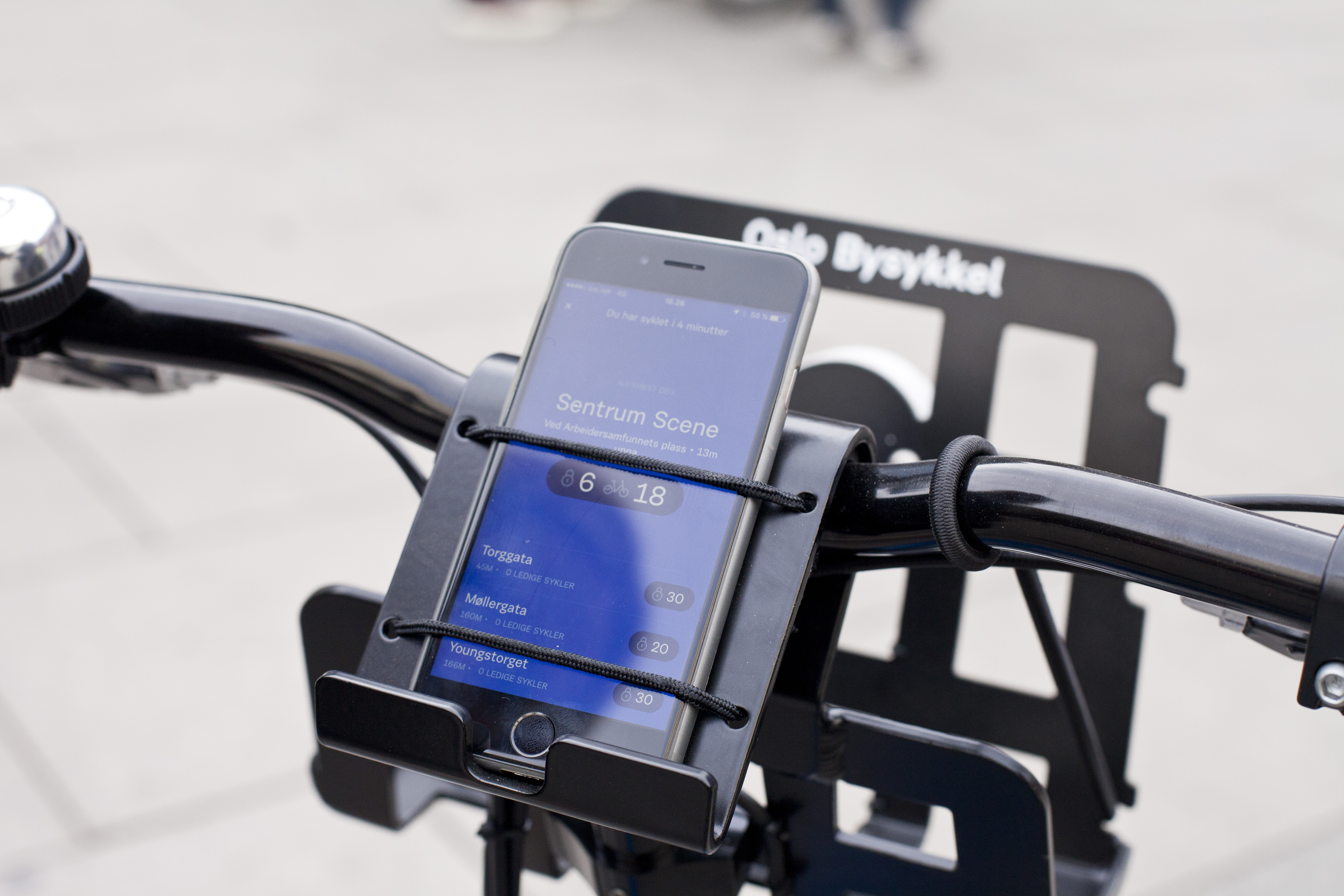
The Oslo Bysykkel app.

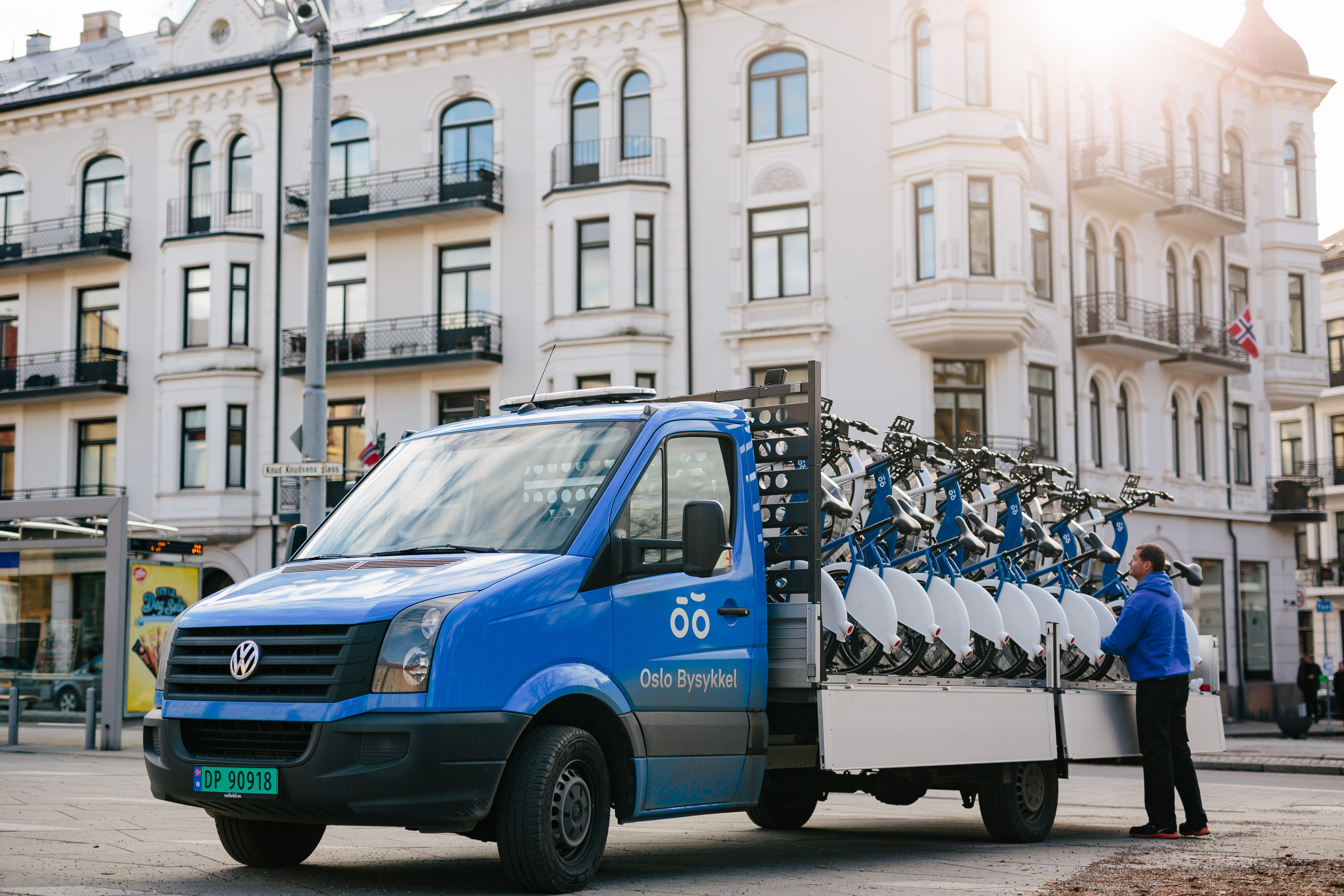
Truck with city bikes.

Oslo Bysykkel ("Oslo City Bike") is a public bicycle sharing system in Oslo, Norway which is owned and operated by an Urban Infrastructure Partner on behalf of Clear Channel Communications and in collaboration with the city of Oslo. The municipality makes outdoor advertising space available, which is used for city bike space. Members can locate and unlock bikes with the Oslo Bysykkel app or on a screen at the stations. The system is based on the purchase of a daily, monthly, or yearly pass. Members can use the bikes for up to an hour; additional time is 15 NOK for 15 minutes. The bikes can be borrowed for a total of 7 hours.

== Structure ==
As of April 2021, there are 249 rental hubs. Regular bicycles are available between April and 30 November each year; a limited number of bikes with studded tires are available in the winter.

== Financing ==
Membership in the sharing system costs 499 NOK per year for individuals. The system is additionally financed by advertising sold and managed by Clear Channel Communications. The advertising is displayed on the bikes, on outdoor billboards set up in connection with the bike stalls and standalone billboards in the city centre.

Clear Channel Communications runs similar projects in Barcelona, Zaragoza, and Stockholm with identical bikes and hub systems. As of 2007, similar schemes are also in effect in other European cities, including JCDecaux's Aix-en-Provence, Rouen, Barcelona (Bicing), Brussels, Lyon (Vélo'v), Nantes (Bicloo), Paris (Vélib), Toulouse, Seville (Sevici), Vienna, Sandnes, and others Pamplona (Cemusa), Copenhagen, OYBike, Call a Bike (Berlin, Frankfurt, Cologne, Stuttgart, Munich, Karlsruhe), Copenhagen/Helsinki/Aarhus (CIOS), Stockholm and Zaragoza.
