= Albert Nordengen =

Norwegian banker and politician

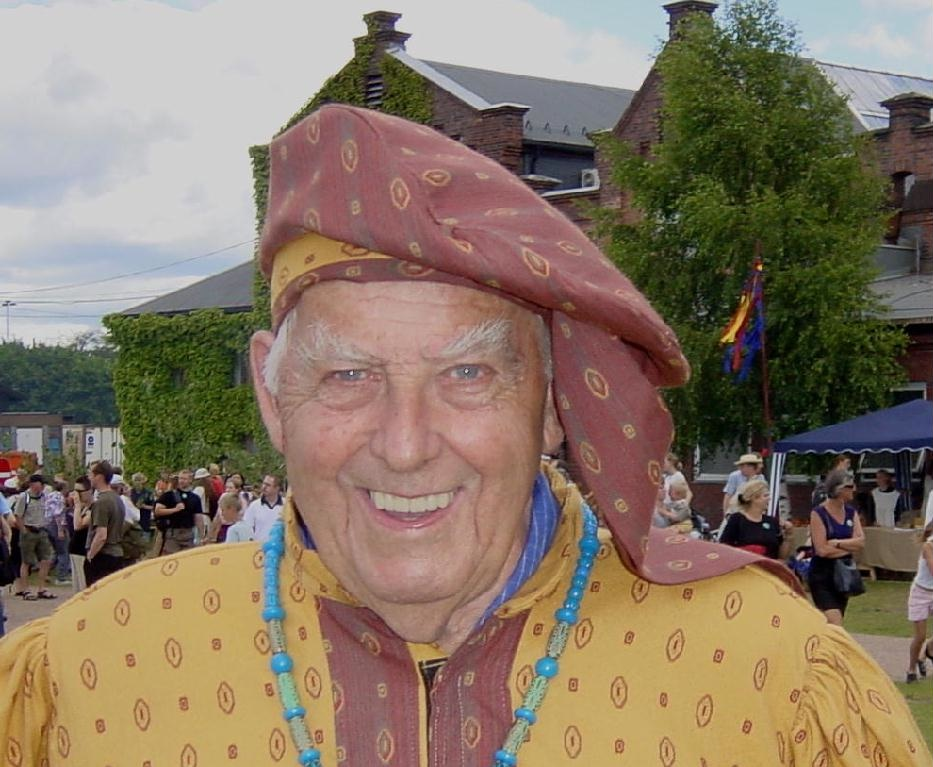
Albert Nordengen

Albert Nordengen (2 May 1923 – 18 December 2004) was a Norwegian banker and politician with the Conservative Party. He became one of the more popular and beloved mayors in the history of Oslo.

== Background ==
He was born and grew up in Våler, Østfold as one of six children of Karl Severin Nordengen (1892–1976) and Elsebet Vigdal (1902–86). At age 14, he entered Treiders handelsskole and later Grimelands skole both in Oslo. He graduated from the Banking Academy (Bankakademiet) in 1947 and began his banking career as an assistant at Spareskillingsbanken.

== Political career ==
He started his political career as a member of the Oslo City Council. He served as a member of the city council from 1952 to 1991. He became group leader for the Conservative Party in the city council in 1968. In 1976 he became mayor, a position he held for fourteen years until 1990. Nordengen quickly became a much beloved figure with the citizens of Oslo. Despite being born in rural Østfold, he was a true Oslo patriot even recording a version of the well-known Norwegian song Akerselva (a tribute to the popular river that runs through the city). In October 2002 he received the King's Order of Merit in Gold for his services to Norwegian politics. In 1993 Nordengen received the Medal of St. Hallvard (St. Hallvardsmedaljen) from the city of Oslo.

== Personal life ==
In 1952, he married Inger Tandberg (1929–2006). They were the parents of Lutheran theologian and author Per Anders Nordengen (born 1953). On 9 December 2004, after speaking at a gathering for veteran athletes, he collapsed in a parking lot due to a myocardial infarction. He never regained consciousness before dying nine days later at Diakonhjemmet Hospital .

Political offices
Preceded by Brynjulf Bull	Mayor of Oslo; 1976–1990	Succeeded by Peter N. Myhre
