= Merete Agerbak-Jensen =

Norwegian politician (born 1967)

Merete Agerbak-Jensen (born 22 August 1967) is a Norwegian politician for the Conservative Party.

She was born in Oslo, and was educated at the Norwegian Journalist College in 1994 and at the University of Oslo. She worked as a journalist in Akers Avis from 1987 to 1990 and Verdens Gang from 1995 to 1997. From 2001 to 2003 she worked as communications director in Avinor and before 2006 information director in Oslo Sporveier.

She served in the position of deputy representative to the Norwegian Parliament from Oslo during the terms 1993–1997 and 1997–2001. From 1998 to 2001 she was city commissioner (byråd) of the environment and transport in the city government of Oslo. In 2006 she became city commissioner of urban planning. She left in September 2009, and instead became communications director in Kollektivtransportproduksjon. She was a member of Oslo city council during the terms 1987–1991, 1991–1995 and 1999–2003. She was also deputy chair of the local party chapter from 1998 to 2001.

Political offices
| Preceded by Kari E. Eliassen | Oslo City Commissioner of Transport and the Environment; 1998–2000 | Succeeded by Hilde Barstad |
| Preceded by Peter N. Myhre | Oslo City Commissioner of Urban Planning; 2006–2009 | Succeeded by Bård Folke Fredriksen |
