= Rolf Stranger =

Norwegian businessman and politician (1891–1990)

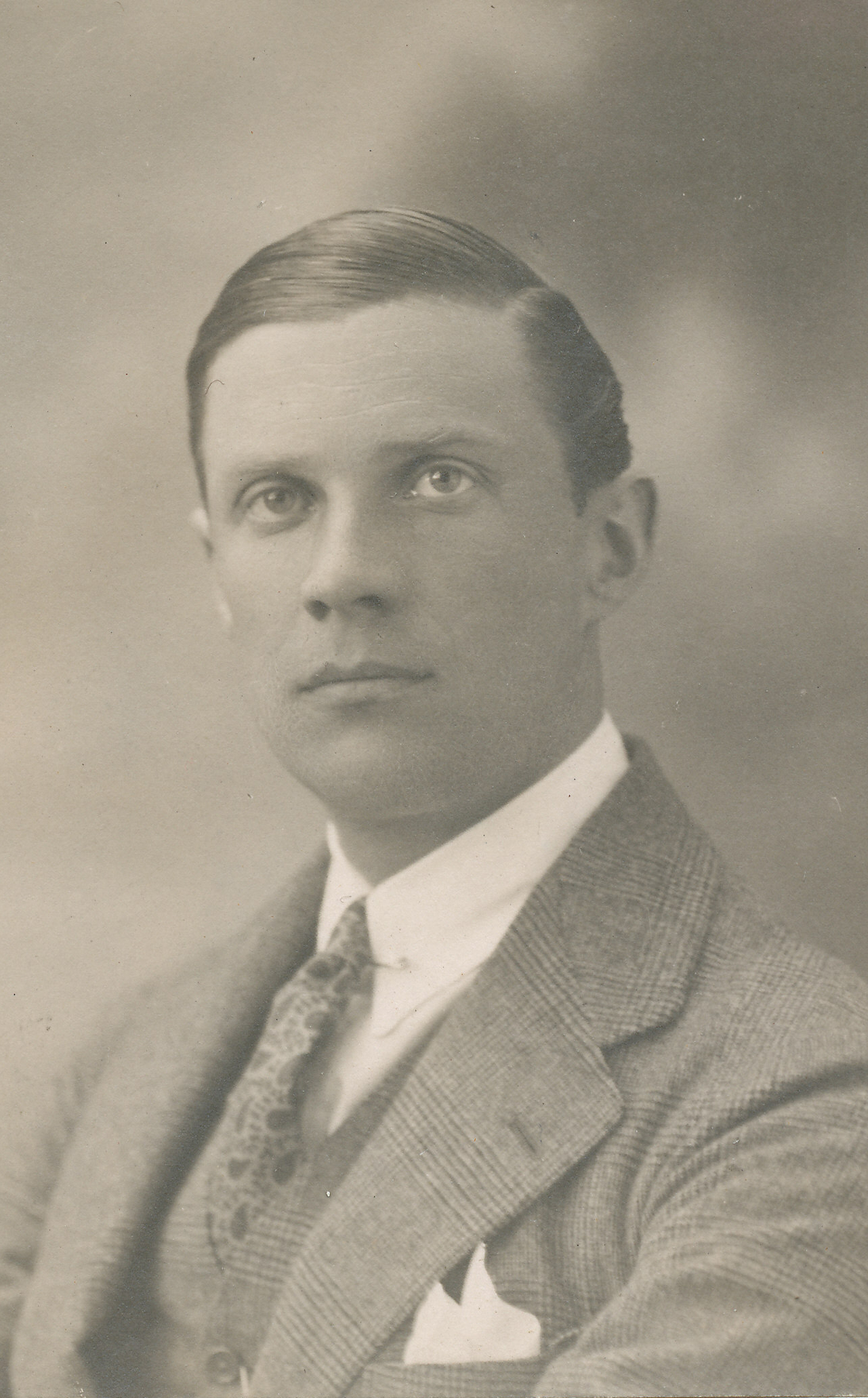

Mayor of Oslo
- In office 1940–1963

Personal details
- Born: 15 January 1891 Oslo, Norway
- Died: 18 June 1990 (aged 99) Oslo, Norway
- Education: University of Oslo

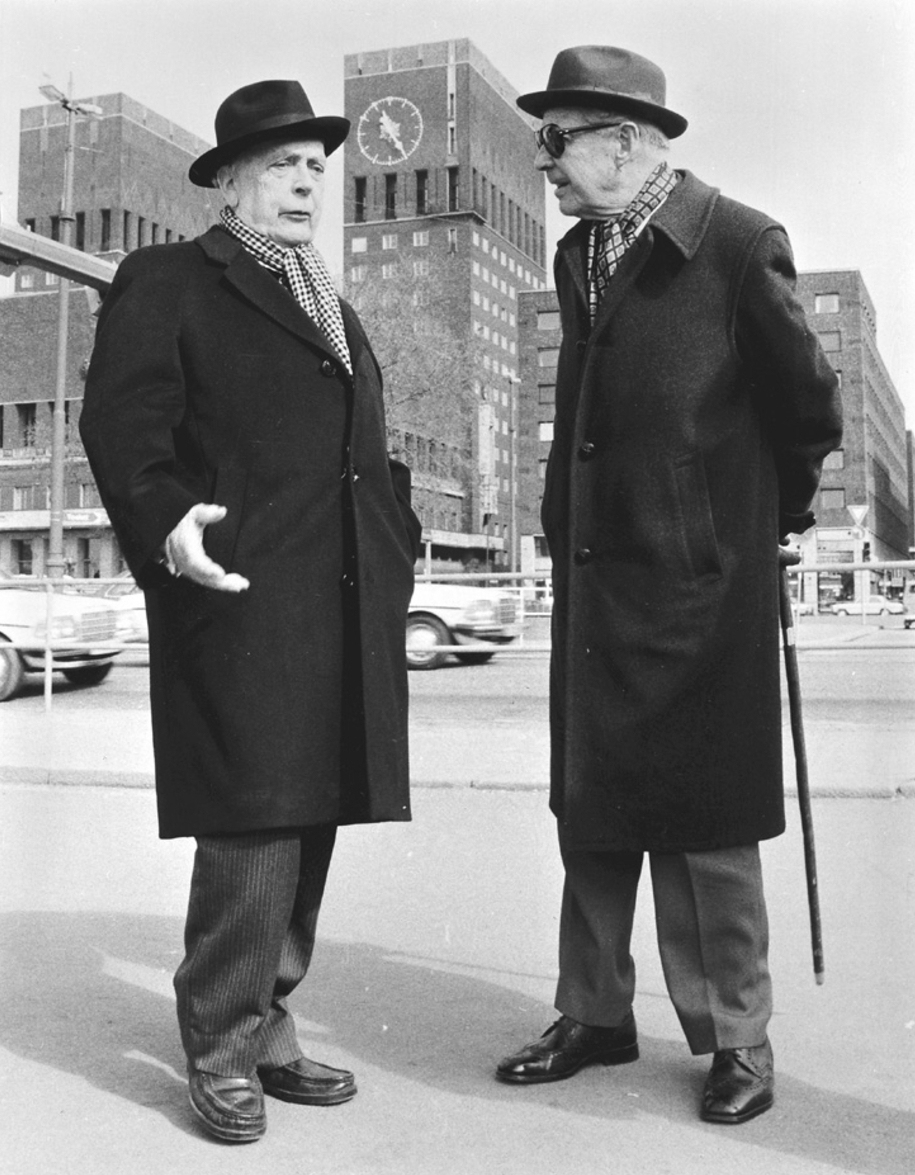
Rolf Stranger (right) with fellow former mayor of Oslo, Brynjulf Bull (1982)

Rolf Stranger (15 January 1891 – 18 June 1990) was a Norwegian businessman and politician for the Conservative Party who served as Mayor of Oslo.

== Biography ==
Rolf Stranger was born in Kristiania. He was the son of Anund Hanssen (1847–1931) and Hilda Theodora Jørgensen (1849–1910). He attended St. Hans Haugen school graduating artium in 1909. He studied at University of Oslo graduating cand.jur. in 1914. After graduation, he joined the family business Hanssen & Bergh A / S, where he was manager from 1917 to 1953. The company was a wholesaler and clothing manufacturer .

During the occupation of Norway by Nazi Germany, he was imprisoned in Bredtveit concentration camp from November 1943 to May 1944.

Stranger was a long-time member of the Oslo City Council serving from 1926 to 1967. He served as Mayor of Oslo in the periods 1940–1941, 1945, 1955–1959 and 1962–1963. He represented Oslo in the Parliament of Norway in 1945 and was re-elected on one occasion. He had previously served in the position of deputy representative during the terms 1931–1933, 1934–1936 and 1937–1945.

== Cultural and civic activities ==
Stranger maintained a strong interest in various cultural and civic activities throughout his lengthy career. His was active in film, theater, music and art. From 1924 to 1971, he served as chairman of the Norwegian Trade Fair (Norges Varemesse). He was chairman of the Oslo Nye Teater during the period 1959–84. In 1982, he established an endowment, Rolf Strangers kulturfon, which finances scientific research in Oslo's cultural history. In 1987, he produced his autobiography Mitt hjertes Oslo (Oslo: Aschehoug, 1987. ISBN 9788203154171). In his honor, the eastern part of Rådhusplassen in Oslo was named Rolf Strangers plass during 1998.

== Honours and awards ==
Among his other honors, Stranger was awarded the King's Medal of Merit (Kongens fortjenstmedalje) in gold in 1957 and the Medal of St. Hallvard in 1960. He was made a Knight Grand Officer of the Order of St. Olav in 1965 and holder of Norwegian Commercial Association decorations in gold. He was made a Commander of the Order of Vasa (Sweden) and of the Order of the Dannebrog (Denmark). In 1961, he was awarded the Petter Dass Medal (Petter Dass -medaljen) for his active efforts in the reconstruction of the Northern Norwegian Student Foundation (Nordnorsk Student- og Elevhjem).

=== Foreign honours ===
- Austria: Grand Officer of the Order of Honour for Services to the Republic of Austria
- Belgium: Knight Commander of the Order of Leopold I
- Finland: Commander of the Order of the Lion of Finland
- France: Officer of the Order of the Legion of Honour
- Hungary: Commander of the Order of Merit of the Republic of Hungary
- Italy: Grand Officer of the Order of Merit of the Italian Republic
- Romania: Recipient of the Medal for Merit
- Spain: Knight Grand Officer of the Order of Isabella the Catholic
- Thailand: Knight Grand Officer of the Order of the Crown
- Tunisia: Grand Officer of the Order of the Republic

== Other sources ==
- "Rolf Stranger" (in Norwegian). Storting.

Political offices
Preceded by Einar Gerhardsen	Mayor of Oslo; 1940–1941	Succeeded by Einar Gerhardsen
Preceded by Einar Gerhardsen	Mayor of Oslo; 1945	Succeeded by Arnfinn Vik
Preceded by Brynjulf Bull	Mayor of Oslo; 1956–1959	Succeeded by Brynjulf Bull
Preceded by Brynjulf Bull	Mayor of Oslo; 1962–1963	Succeeded by Brynjulf Bull
