= Stockholm City Bikes =

Bicycle-sharing system in Stockholm, Sweden

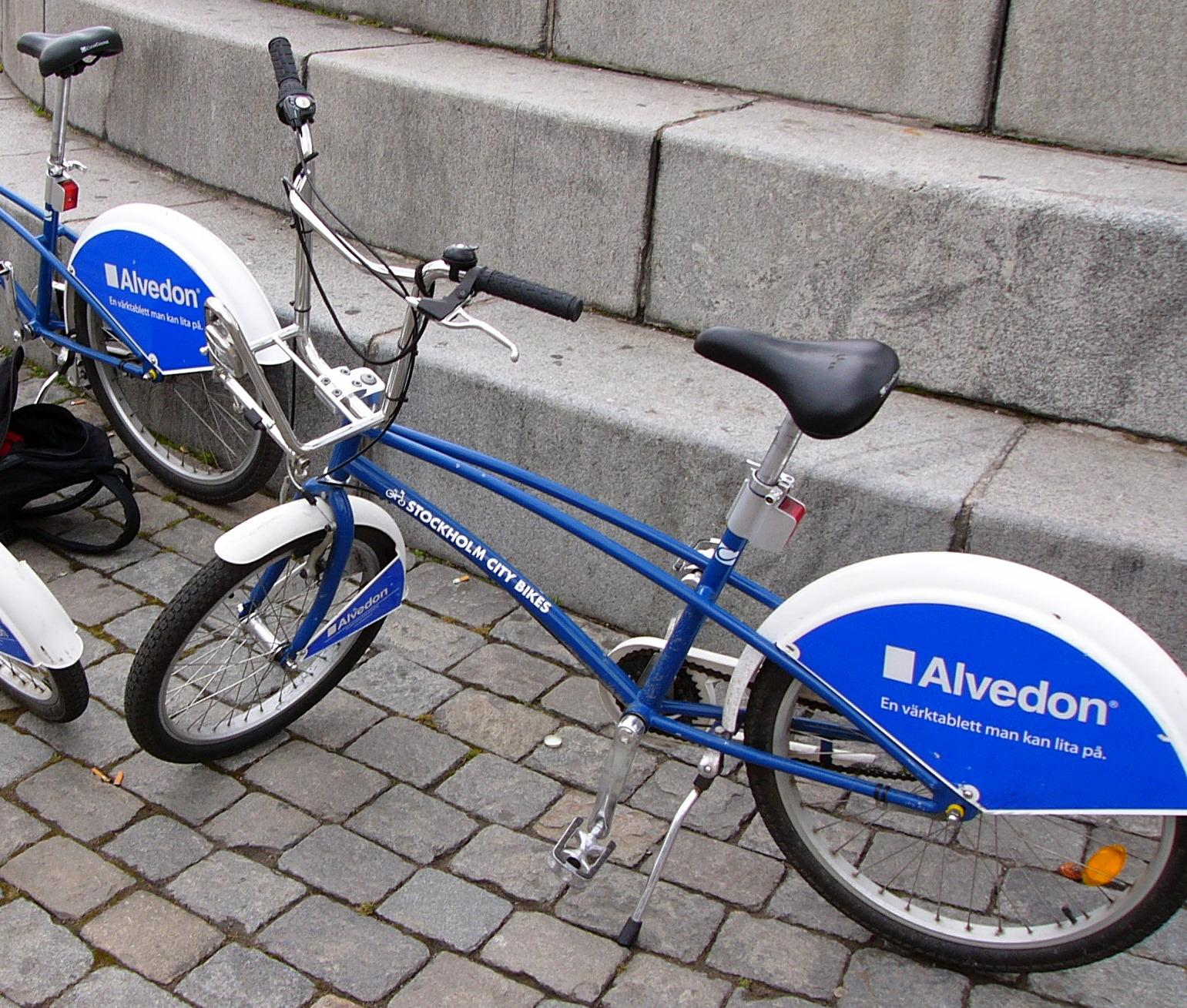
A Stockholm City Bike with Alvedon advertising in August 2007

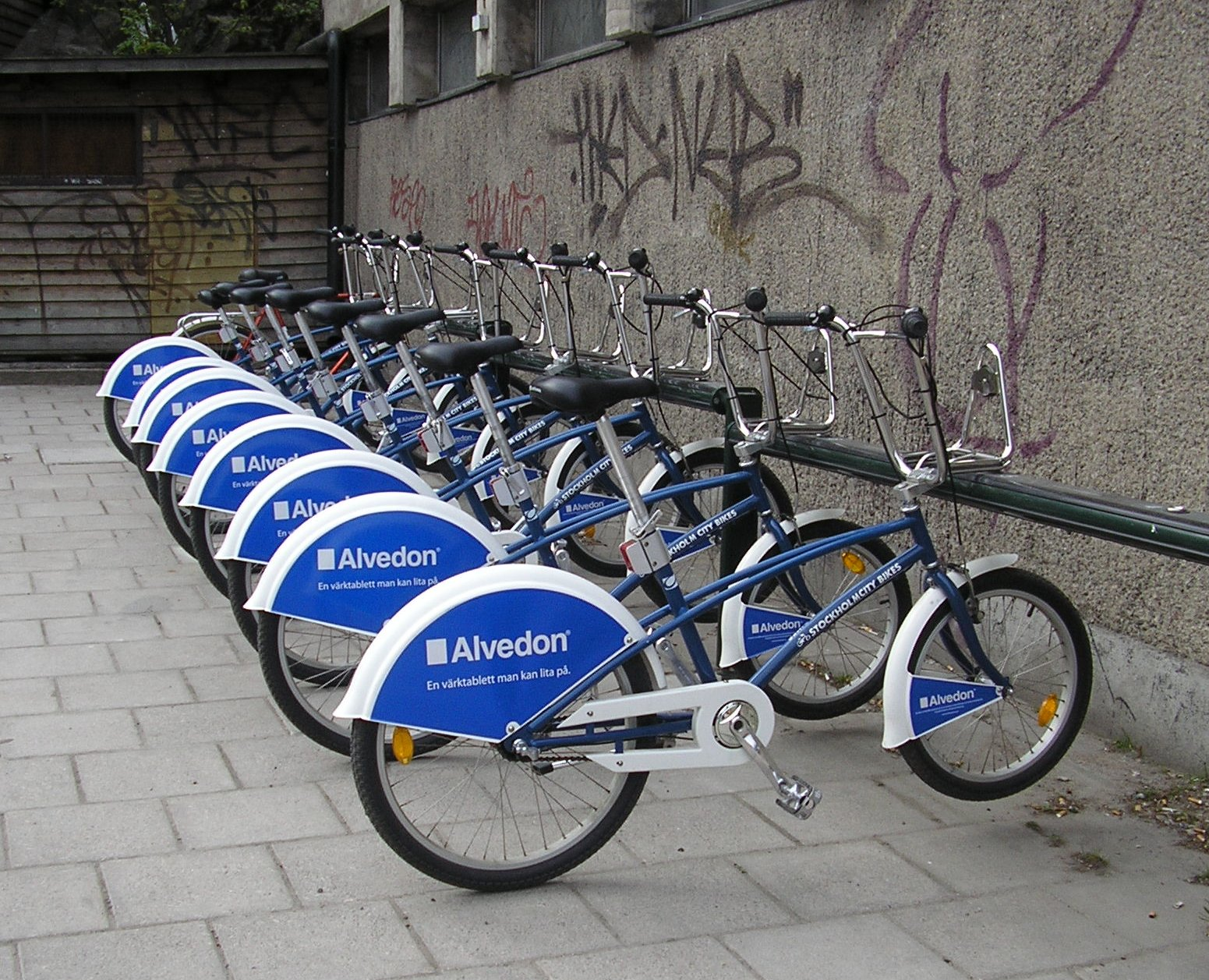
Stockholm City Bikes, Sweden

Stockholm City Bikes is a public-private partnership project of Stockholm in Sweden and the outdoor advertising unit of Clear Channel Communications. From 2006 till 2018 they operated a community bicycle program that allowed for renting a bicycle for a maximum period of 3 hours, between 06:00 and 22:00 (last rental at 22:00).

== Rental system ==
The rental system requires a membership and a rental card. A card and membership can be purchased on the City Bikes website using a credit card or at one of many retail locations throughout the city.

Retail locations include "SL centres" (SL is Stockholm's public transportation company), Pressbyrån, 7-Eleven, certain hostels and hotels as well as various Tourist information centres. A full list is available on the website.

SL Access public transportation cards can be used instead of a City Bikes card. In this case a membership account can be created and activated on the City Bikes website immediately upon payment using a credit card. The number on the back of the SL Access card is associated with your account. The same applies if you already have a previously expired City Bikes card.

Using an SL Access card for City Bikes will not prevent it from working on SL public transportation. Also, expired or empty SL Access cards will work just fine with an active City Bikes account.

The price for a full year is 250 SEK when purchased via the website. At a retail site the prices are 300 SEK for a year, or 165 SEK for 3 days. Registration will require some form of valid Swedish identification or a passport for visitors. Registering via the website does not require identification, however a Swedish personnummer must be filled in during the registration process.

The City Bikes rental card or SL Access card can be reused over multiple seasons or loaded with additional 3-day passes.

Stockholm City Bikes are available between the hours of 06:00 and 22:00, from 1 April until 31 October, unlike other public bicycle programs that are available throughout the year.

A bicycle can be checked out until 22:00. The maximum rental period is 3 hours, however a bike can be returned and immediately re-rented at any City Bikes hub, at no additional charge. If a bicycle is not returned within 3 hours, the account will be issued a warning. If 3 warnings are issued or the bicycle is not returned after 5 hours, the account is blocked and further rental is not possible.

If the bicycle is stolen or damaged, the user is required to cooperate with customer service fully, and also must file a police report. If the bicycle is stolen or damaged due to user negligence, the user might be required to pay a fee of 800 SEK.

== Hubs ==
As of January 2014, the system has approximately 110 hubs. Each hub contains between 9 and 24 bikes. The rental card is swiped over a reader and a computer screen displays the number of the bike that is being unlocked. The user now has 3 hours to return the bike (i.e. lock) to any of the hubs in the city.

In 2013, the system was expanded to neighbouring towns Sundbyberg, Solna and Lidingö. Several rental stations have also opened in the city of Uppsala. Further expansion is expected in 2014.

The project was launched in the fall of 2006. During 2007 the system was expected to have 1000 bicycles and about 80 hubs in Stockholm.

== Financing ==
The season card entitles the buyer to receive a free bicycle helmet that is decorated with advertising. The entire system is financed by advertising sold and managed by Clear Channel Communications. The advertising is displayed on the bikes and on outdoor billboards set up in connection with the bike stalls.

Clear Channel Communications runs similar projects in Barcelona, Zaragoza with identical bikes and hub systems.

== Complications ==
The system has been criticised for being somewhat complicated for foreigners who do not understand Swedish. Moreover, the hubs sometimes physically lock the bikes to the hubs, but do not register the fact in the computer system, resulting in blocked rental cards.

Very early on, the rental hubs were subjected to vandalism during night time, resulting in bicycle thefts and destroyed bicycles and hubs. Management of the project had then said that if vandalism is not limited, the project might become too expensive and eventually canceled. However eventually the vandalism subsided and in the last few years, there have been no plans to shut the system down.

== See also ==
- Clear Channel Communications
- Stockholm Municipality
- Public-private partnership
- Community bicycle program
