= Nybrua =

Bridge in Oslo, Norway

Coordinates: 59°55′4″N 10°45′33″E

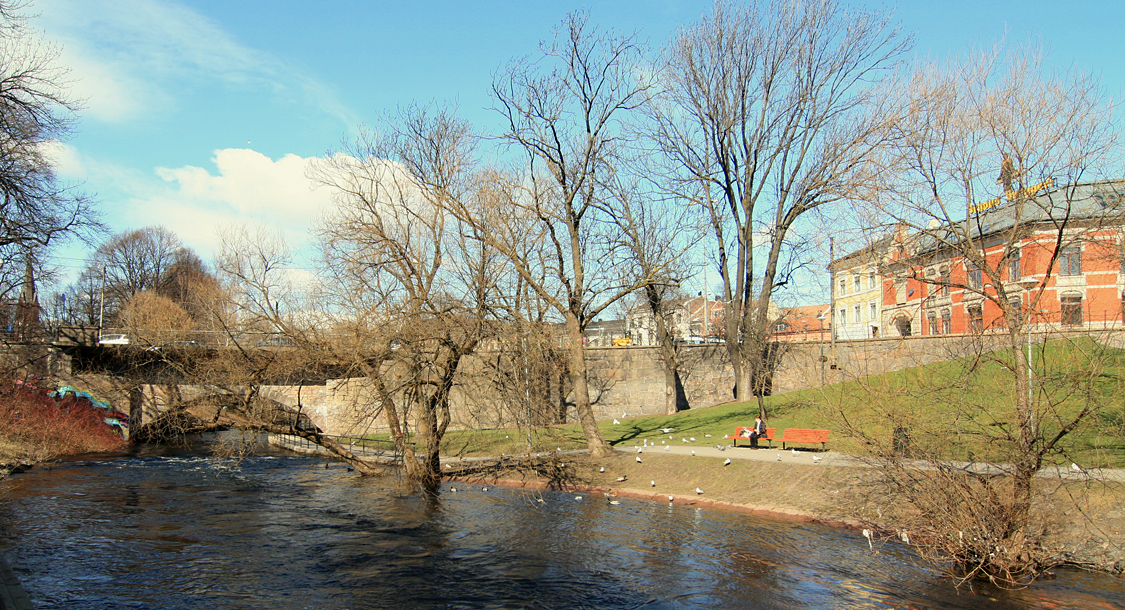
Nybrua on Akerselva

Nybrua is a bridge over the Aker River (Akerselva) in Oslo, Norway.

== History ==
Nybrua bridge, which was built in 1827, lies in the district of Grünerløkka. It is crossed by Storgata which continues as Trondheimsveien on the eastern side of the river. At the same time, Storgata was lengthened and the lower part of Trondheimsveien was created.

As Oslo's major entrance point from the north, it became a part of Trondhjemske hovedvei which starts at Nybrua and goes to the city limits at Vestli. Later, Vaterland Bridge, as well as Brugata and Lakkegata streets were also added to the route, to the north of the city. Nybrua was later extended and strengthened to take trams and modern motor traffic, although parts of the original structure can still be seen.

== Transport ==
Main Article: Nybrua tram stop

Nybrua was served by an Oslo Tramway station of the same name. The station became disused in 2015. Another tram stop nearby (Hausmanns gate) was closed in 2018 and the area was upgraded as part of the Fremtidens Byreise program. A new tram stop called Nybrua was opened on 15 February 2021. It was established in front of the Legevakten.

== Gallery ==
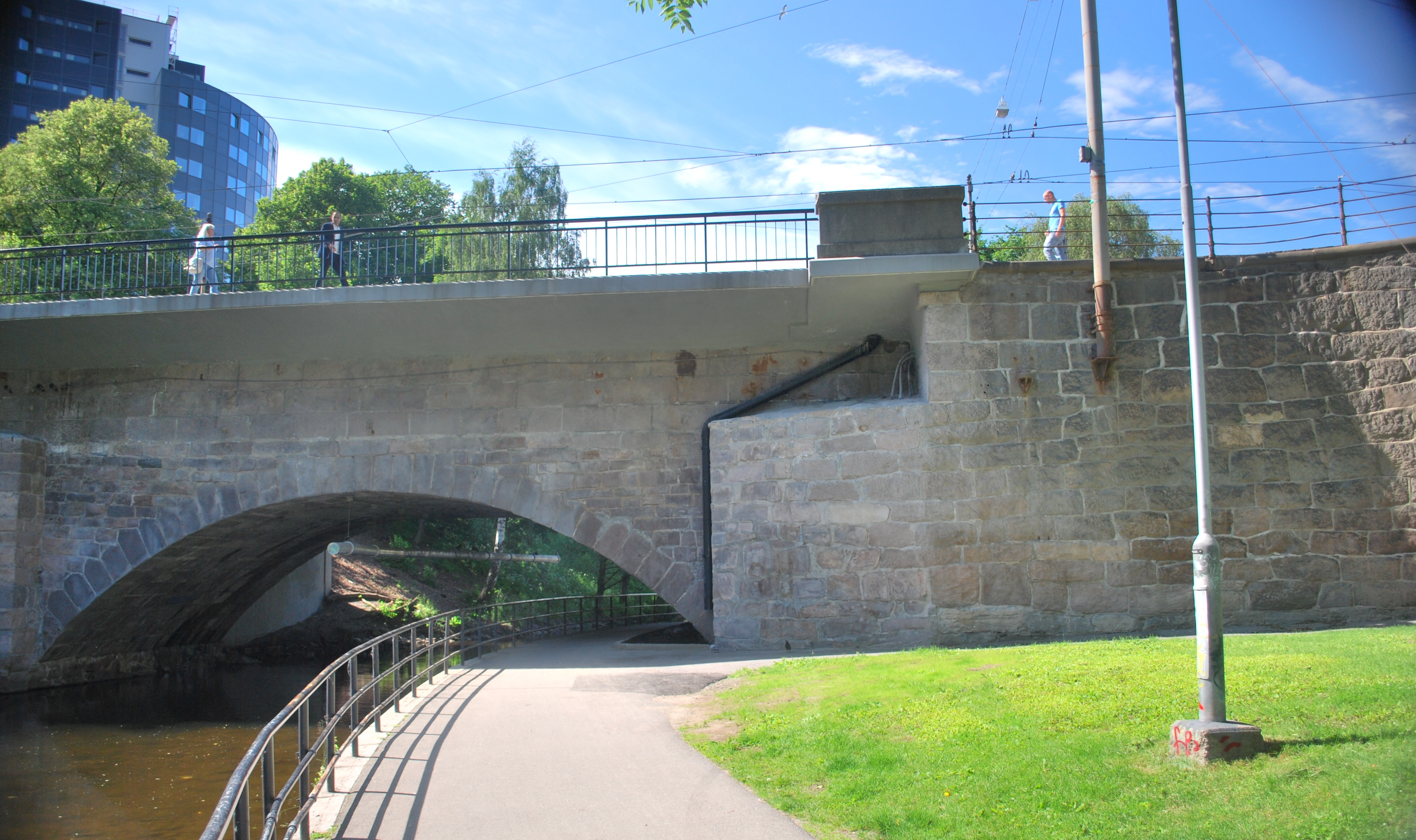
Eastside of Nybrua

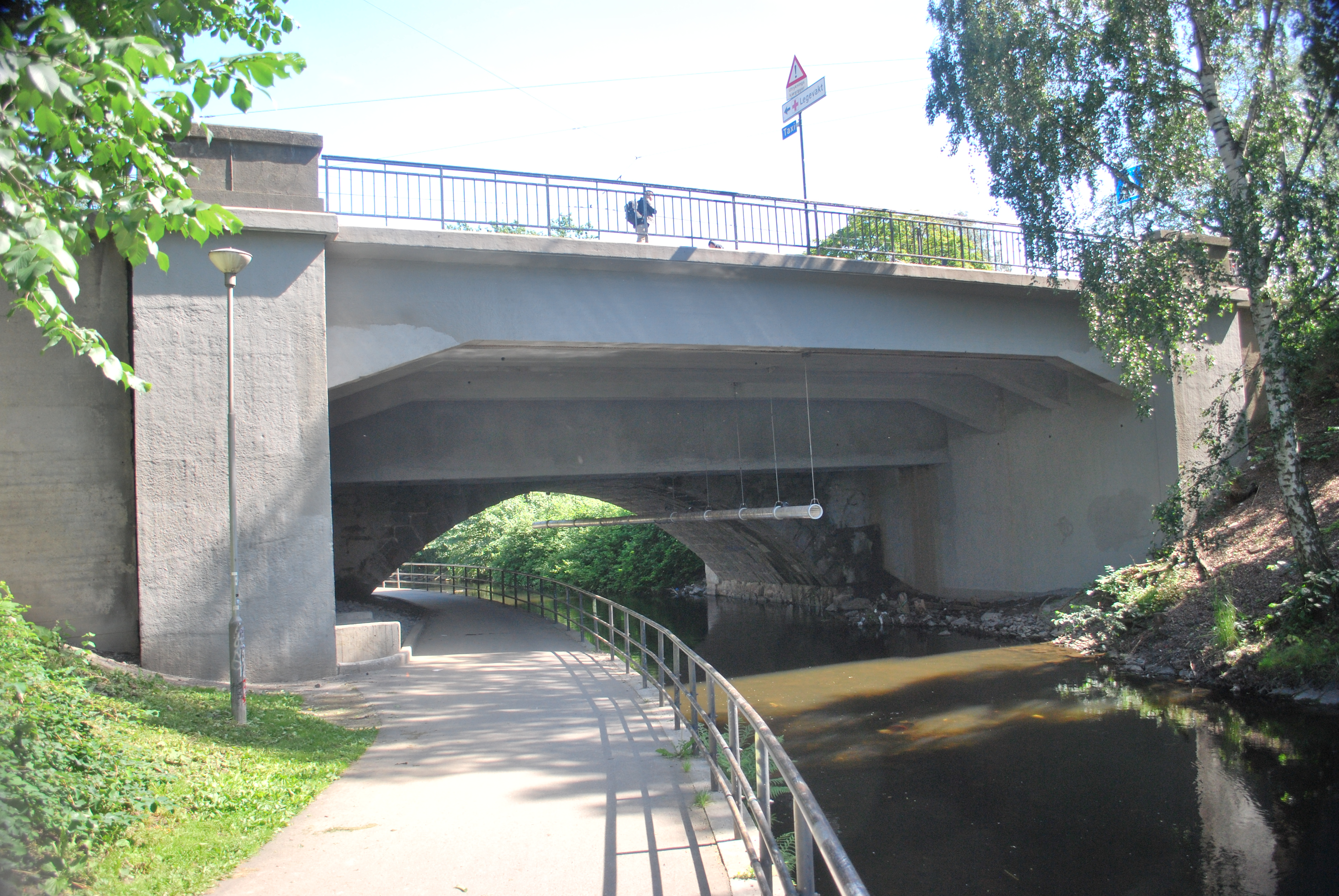
Westside of Nybrua
