= Vaterland Bridge =

Bridge in Oslo, Norway

Coordinates: 59.913450°N 10.758233°E

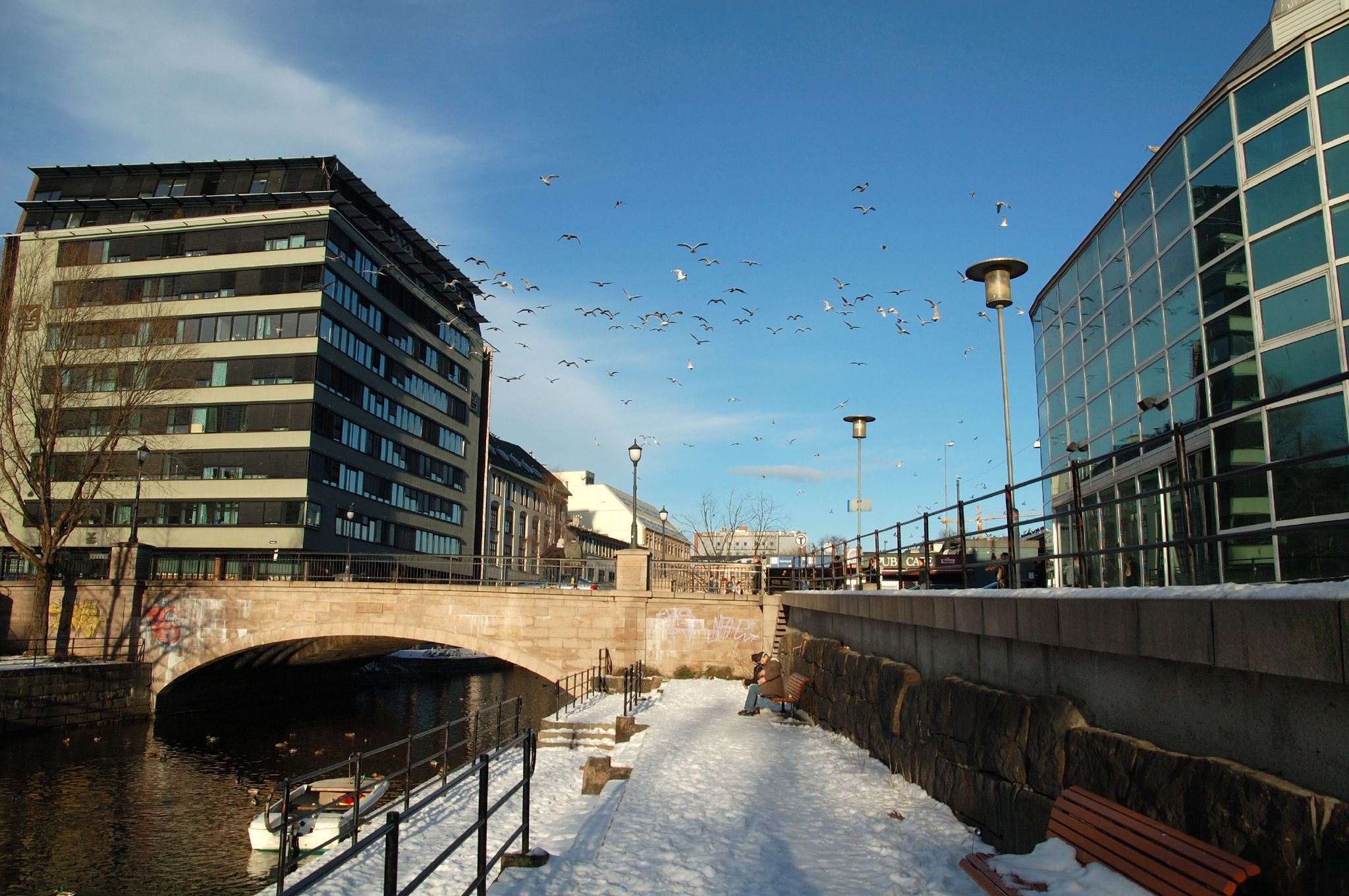
Vaterland Bridge

Vaterland Bridge (Norwegian: Vaterlands bro) is a bridge that crosses the Aker River in the city center of Oslo, Norway.

== History ==
The bridge is located on the street Brugata, and connects the neighborhoods of Vaterland and Grønland. The bridge was originally built in 1654 and rebuilt during the 1830s. Vaterland bridge was the main entrance to the city from the north and east until the construction of Nybrua in 1827.
