= Andreas Tofte =

Norwegian businessperson, elected official and philanthropist

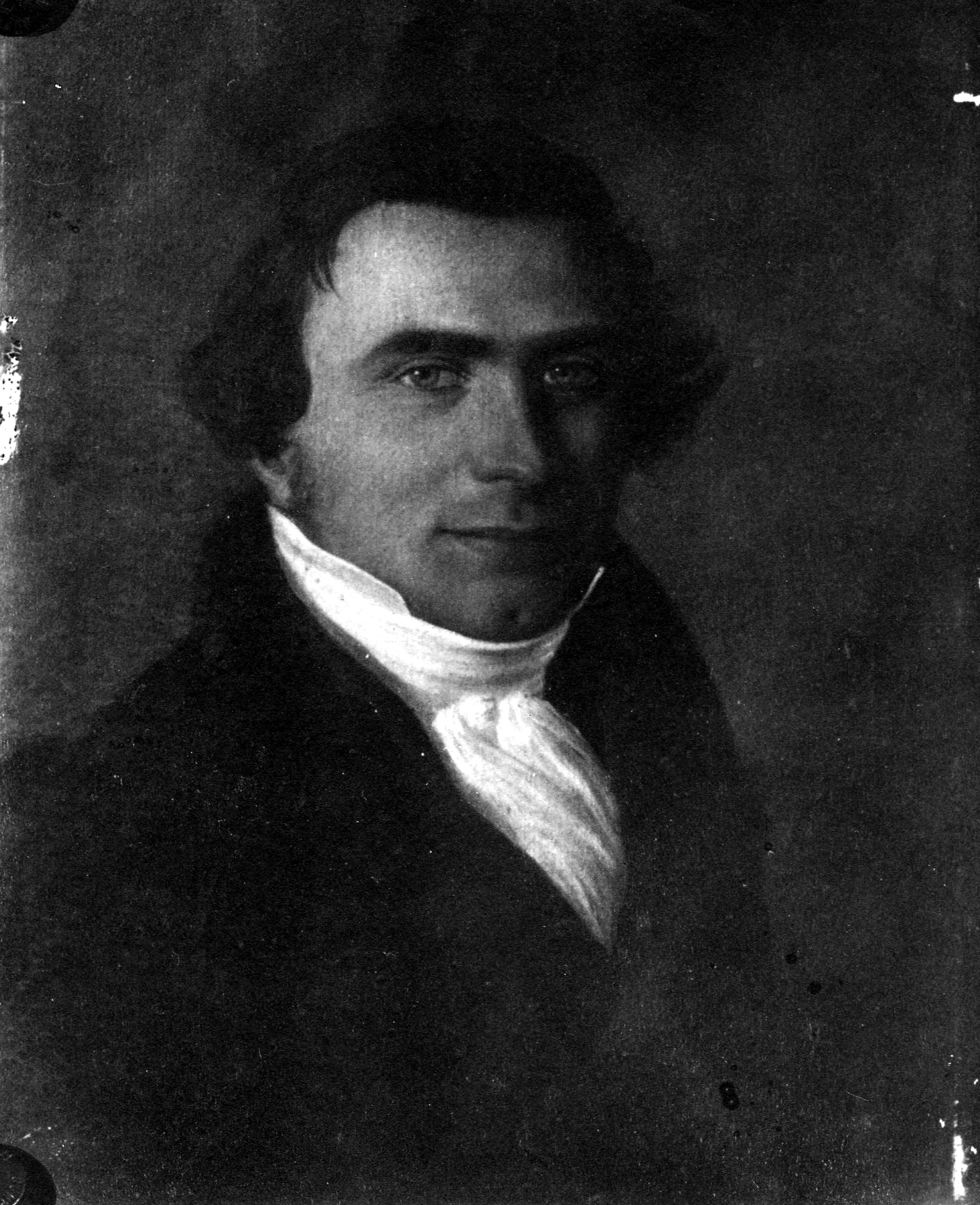
- Andreas Tofte

1st Mayor of Oslo
- In office 1837–1837
- Preceded by: Position created
- Succeeded by: Herman Foss

Personal details
- Born: 28 March 1795 Hurum in Buskerud, Norway
- Died: 27 September 1852 (aged 57) Oslo, Norway

Andreas Tofte (28 March 1795 – 27 September 1852) was a Norwegian businessperson, elected official and philanthropist. He served as the first Mayor of Oslo, Norway.

== Biography ==
He was born on the Tofte farm at Hurum in Buskerud, Norway. He was a son of landowner Mads Trulsen Tofte (1750–1823) and Elisabeth Borch (1749–1826). In November 1819, he married Christine Søeberg (1797–1848) in Drammen. His daughter married businessman Thorvald Meyer, who inherited his enterprises. He was also an ancestor of Erling Christophersen and Christian Schweigaard Stang.

In 1819, Tofte moved from Hurum to Christiania (now Oslo), where he established commercial citizenship. He operated a carriage and shipping business which within 10 years made him a wealthy man. He was elected as the first mayor of Christiania in 1837, and also served on the executive committee in 1838, 1841 and 1842.

Tofte was a board member and founder of the child care facilities Enerhaugen Asyl and Piperviken Asyl. He also financed the children's hospital Toftes Gift Institute (Toftes gave) in Munkedamsveien which was gifted to the municipality. The latter moved to Helgøya in 1896.

Tofte died at Christiania in 1851. He was buried at Vår Frelsers gravlund.

Political offices
Preceded by position created	Mayor of Christiania; 1837	Succeeded by Herman Foss
