= Ann-Marit Sæbønes =

Norwegian politician

63rd Mayor of Oslo
- In office 1992–1995
- Preceded by: Peter N. Myhre
- Succeeded by: Per Ditlev-Simonsen

Member of Parliament for Oslo
- In office 1992 – 17 October 1995

Personal details
- Born: 11 December 1945 (age 80)
- Party: Labour Party

Ann-Marit Sæbønes (born 11 December 1945) is a Norwegian politician for the Labour Party.

She was born in Porsgrunn.

She worked as a physiotherapist in Norway and Kenya from 1969 to 1979, and studied sociology at the University of Oslo in 1979.

She served as a deputy representative to the Norwegian Parliament from Oslo between 1985 and 1989. She later became the first female mayor of Oslo, sitting from 1992 to 1995.

Sæbønes is married to Tore Eriksen.

Political offices
Preceded by Peter N. Myhre	Mayor of Oslo; 1992–1995	Succeeded by Per Ditlev-Simonsen
