= Bernt Bull =

Norwegian politician

Bernt Bull (born 12 July 1946) is a Norwegian politician for the Labour Party.

He is a son of Brynjulf Bull, another Labour Party politician. Bernt Bull holds the cand.jur. degree. He was a member of Oslo city council from 1980 to 1995, and led the city council group of the Labour Party from 1992 to 1994. He also represented his party as secretary for the Labour Party parliamentary group from 1982 to 1986, and State Secretary in the Norwegian Ministry of the Environment from 1994 to 1997.
