= Trygve Bull =

Norwegian lecturer and politician

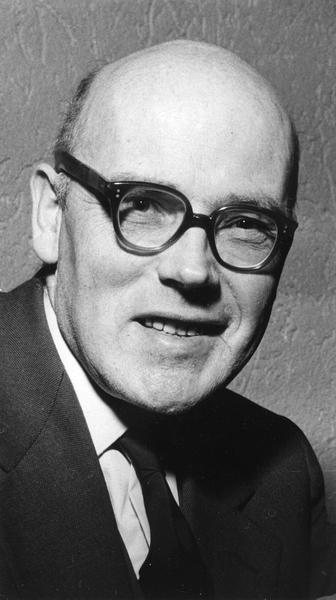
- Bull, c.1965
- Born: 13 August 1905; Kristiania, Norway
- Died: 16 March 1999 (aged 93)
- Occupation: Politician

Trygve Friis Bull (13 August 1905 – 16 March 1999) was a Norwegian lecturer and politician. He was a member of Mot Dag in the 1920s and 1930s, and contributed to the magazines Mot Dag, Clarté and Kontakt. During World War II he was imprisoned by the Germans, and incarcerated at the Grini and Sachsenhausen concentration camps. He was a politician for the Labour Party, a deputy representative to the Storting from 1957 to 1969, and later a politician for the Socialist Left Party. He was a member of the committee Norsk Språknemnd from its establishment in 1952 until 1972, and Norsk språkråd from 1972 to 1981.

== Early life ==
Bull was born in Kristiania and attended Oslo Cathedral School, obtaining his examen artium in 1924. He taught at Sydneshaugen School in Bergen from 1936 and at Bergen Cathedral School from 1937.

== Selected works ==
- Mot Dag og Erling Falk (1955)
