= Gerhardsen =

Gerhardsen is a Norwegian surname meaning 'son of Gerhard'. The given name Gerhard or Gerhart is a Germanic Masculine name commonly given in Scandinavia. Notable people with the surname include:

- Carin Gerhardsen (born 1962), Swedish author of crime fiction
- Einar Gerhardsen (1897–1987), Norwegian politician
- Gerhard Meidell Gerhardsen (1848–1912), Norwegian bailiff and politician
- Gerhard Meidell Gerhardsen (1885–1931), Norwegian bailiff and politician
- Gerhard Meidell Gerhardsen (economist) (1912–1986), Norwegian economist
- Marte Gerhardsen (born 1972), Norwegian civil servant, politician and organizational leader
- Mina Gerhardsen (born 1975), Norwegian politician
- Rolf Gerhardsen (1902–1971), Norwegian journalist and politician
- Rune Gerhardsen (1946–2021), Norwegian politician
- Werna Gerhardsen (1912–1970), Norwegian politician
