= Nils Hønsvald =

Norwegian politician (1899–1971)

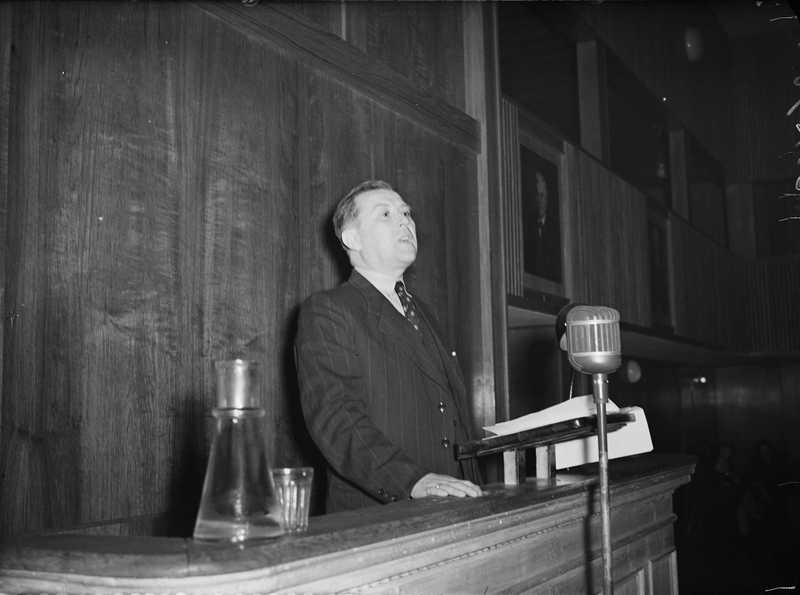
- Hønsvald in 1948.

President of the Odelsting
- In office 8 October 1965 – 30 September 1969
- Vice President: Hans Borgen
- Preceded by: Per Borten
- Succeeded by: Håkon Johnsen

President of the Lagting
- In office 6 October 1961 – 30 September 1965
- Vice President: Einar Hareide
- Preceded by: Bent Røiseland
- Succeeded by: Bent Røiseland

Vice President of the Storting
- In office 8 May 1958 – 30 September 1961
- President: Nils Langhelle
- Preceded by: Nils Langhelle
- Succeeded by: Alv Kjøs

Minister of Provisioning and Reconstruction
- In office 10 January 1948 – 14 September 1950
- Prime Minister: Einar Gerhardsen
- Preceded by: Oscar Torp
- Succeeded by: Position abolished

Personal details
- Born: 4 December 1899 Horten, Vestfold, Norway
- Died: 24 November 1971 (aged 71)
- Party: Labour

Nils Hønsvald (4 December 1899 – 24 November 1971) was a Norwegian newspaper editor and politician for the Labour Party. He was one of the leading figures in Norwegian politics from 1945 to 1969. He served as President of the Nordic Council in 1958 and 1963.

Hønsvald was born in Horten, Vestfold County, Norway. He was editor of Østfold Arbeiderblad in Sarpsborg, regional newspaper for the Norwegian Labour Party which was discontinued in 1929 and editor of Sarpsborg Arbeiderblad, a local newspaper published in Sarpsborg (1929–1969).

He participated in the Left Communist Youth League's military strike action of 1924. He was convicted for assisting in this crime and sentenced to 120 days of prison. He was later present at the congress of 24 April 1927 when the Left Communist Youth League was merged with the Socialist Youth League to found the Workers' Youth League.

During the occupation of Norway by Nazi Germany, he was arrested in March 1941. He was incarcerated at Møllergata 19 before being transferred to Ånebyleiren concentration camp and then to Grini concentration camp in May. He was released on 12 June 1941. In December 1944 he was arrested again, and was transferred from Fredrikstad to Grini, where he remained until the war's end.

Hønsvald was Minister of Supplies and Reconstruction (1948–1950), and minister without portfolio in 1950. Hønsvald was President of the Lagting (1961–1965) and President of the Odelsting (1965–1969). Nils Hønsvalds gate in Sarpsborg was named in his honor.
