= Tove Strand =

Norwegian politician

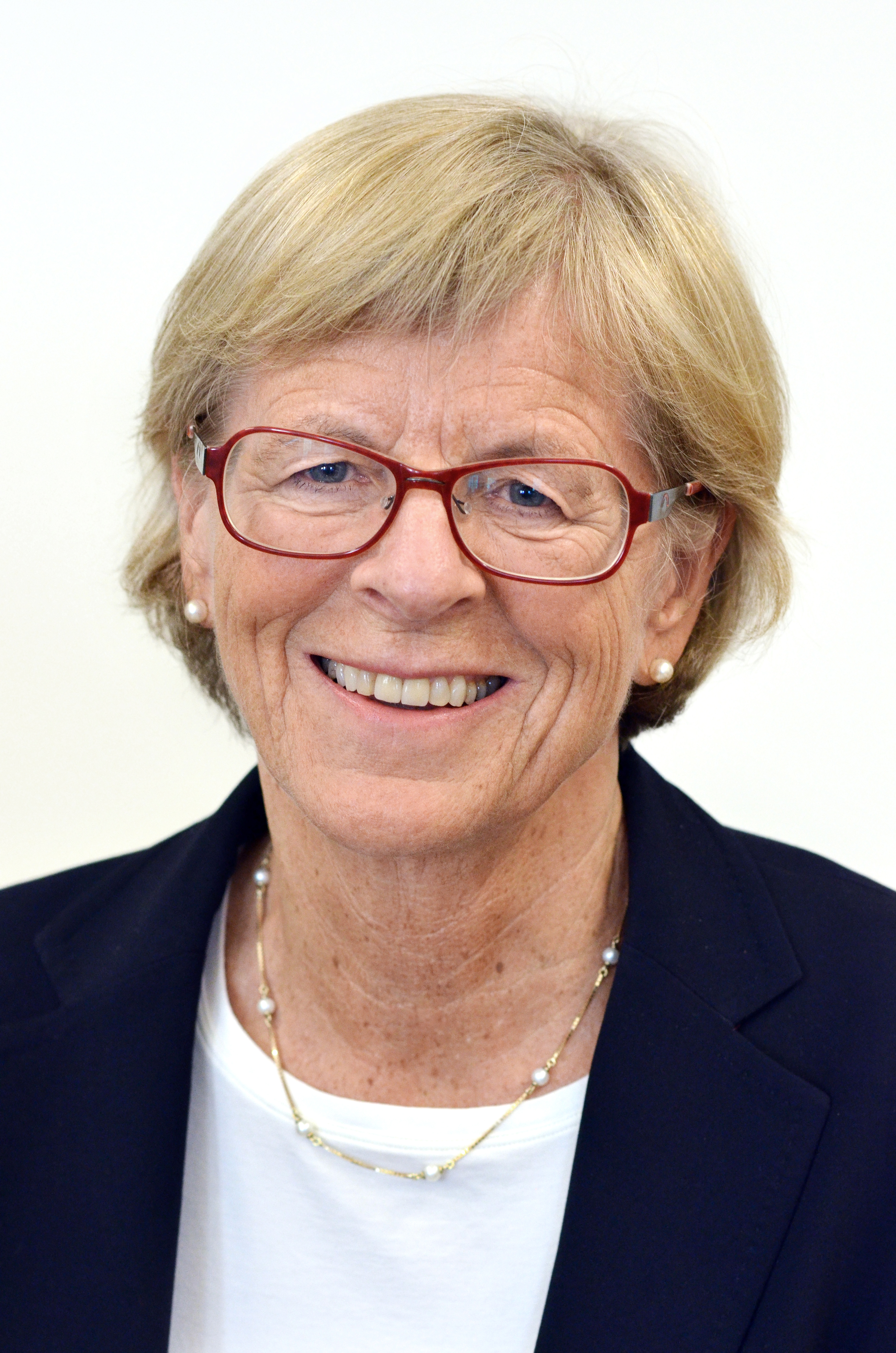

Minister of Social Affairs
- In office 9 May 1986 – 16 October 1989
- Prime Minister: Gro Harlem Brundtland
- Preceded by: Leif Arne Heløe
- Succeeded by: Wenche Frogn Sellæg

Minister of Government Administration and Labour
- In office 3 November 1990 – 4 September 1992
- Prime Minister: Gro Harlem Brundtland
- Preceded by: Kristin Clemet
- Succeeded by: Oddny Aleksandersen

Personal details
- Born: Tove Astri Strand; 29 September 1946 (age 79) Kongsvinger, Norway
- Party: Labour Party
- Spouse: Rune Gerhardsen
- Children: Mina; Marte
- Parent(s): Norvald Strand (father); Svanhild Lundhaug (mother)

Tove Astri Strand (born 29 September 1946) is a Norwegian director and former politician for the Labour Party. She was active in politics between 1963 and 1992, including two periods as a government minister. She headed the Norwegian Agency for Development Cooperation from 1997 to 2005, and since 2005 she is the director of Ullevål University Hospital.

== Early and personal life ==
Born in Kongsvinger as the daughter of local bureaucrat Norvald Strand and nurse Svanhild Lundhaug, she chaired the local chapter of the Workers' Youth League from 1963 to 1966. She then enrolled as a student at the University of Oslo, having chosen to study economics over medicine, She graduated in 1971 with the cand.oecon. degree, and cited Leif Johansen and Nobel Prize laureate Trygve Haavelmo as inspirational economists. While living in Oslo she was a member of the board of local Workers' Youth League chapter from 1968 to 1970.

Tove Strand was formerly married to Rune Gerhardsen, a fellow Labour Party politician and son of former Prime Minister Einar Gerhardsen whom she met in university. Due to the marriage she was named Tove Strand Gerhardsen during this period. Before the couple split in 1996, they had two daughters, Marte and Mina Gerhardsen. Both daughters joined the Labour Party too, and Mina Gerhardsen, as political advisor for Prime Minister Jens Stoltenberg, has been considered particularly influential in Norwegian society.

Tove Strand later married Tor Saglie, the director of the Norwegian Labour and Welfare Service.

== Career ==
=== Professional career ===
After graduation, she worked five years as a clerk in the Ministry of Finance. At the same time, she was elected to serve in the city council of Oslo for the term 1971–1975. When the cabinet Nordli assumed office in January 1976, she was appointed personal secretary (today known as political advisor) in the Ministry of Trade and Shipping. She left in January 1979, to concentrate on her career as a civil servant in the Ministry of Finance, where she was promoted to assistant secretary (byråsjef). However, after only one year she returned to the political scene as a personal secretary, this time in the Ministry of Finance. In February 1981, when the first cabinet Brundtland, Strand was again promoted, this time to state secretary. The first cabinet Brundtland losing office to the cabinet Willoch following the 1981 election, Strand returned to work one more year as assistant secretary in the Ministry of Finance.

In 1982 she left the executive branch of government to work as a head of a department at Rikshospitalet. In May 1986, the second cabinet Brundtland took over as the cabinet Willoch lost a vote of confidence. Strand was brought back to the government's offices, this time as Minister of Social Affairs. She stayed in this position until October 1989, when the second cabinet Brundtland fell due to the 1989 election. However, its successor lasted only one year, and Strand returned in 1990 as Norwegian Minister of Government Administration and Labour in the third cabinet Brundtland. In addition, she had been elected to the Oslo city council for the term 1987–1991.

In between the two tenures as government minister, she had worked as a "project leader" at BI, the Norwegian School of Management. When leaving the third cabinet Brundtland in September 1992, she returned to BI to work as a "special advisor". From 1993 to 1996 she worked as a regional director of the Research Council of Norway. From 1997 to 2005 she headed the state-run directorate Norwegian Agency for Development Cooperation. In 2005 she returned to the hospital business to work as director of Ullevål University Hospital.

=== Boards and committees ===
During her career she has been a member of several boards and committees, both public and private. During her early political career, she was a member of the kindergarten committee of Oslo, as well as a member of the board of the publicly owned electricity company Oslo Lysverker, both from 1971 to 1975. From 1971 to 1979 she was a member of the regional planning council for Oslo and Akershus. She returned in 1990-1991 as a member of the cultural committee in Oslo.

In 1984 she became a board member of the Norwegian Confederation of Sports. She left in 1987, but returned as vice president of the organization from 1994 to 1999. She was also a board member of the Norwegian Handball Federation from 1993 to 1995. She was also a member of the board of the publishing house Universitetsforlaget from 1982 to 1985, and the Bank of Norway from 1990 to 1999. She chaired the board of the National Institute of Occupational Health from 1990 to 1991, and was also involved in the Royal Norwegian Society for Development and the Norwegian UNESCO commission. From 1993 to 1994, she was deputy chair of the organization Sosialdemokrater mot EU, which opposed a Norwegian application for membership in the European Union. Following the 1994 Norwegian European Union membership referendum, such a membership was out of the question.

After some years without committee or board memberships, she joined the board of the International Development Law Organization and Arbeidsgiverforeningen Spekter in 2007. Also, since 2006 she has chaired the Kronprinsparets Humanitære Fond, a humanitarian fund initiated by Haakon, Crown Prince of Norway and the Crown Princess Mette-Marit.

Political offices
Preceded by Leif Arne Heløe	Norwegian Minister of Social Affairs; 1986–1989	Succeeded by Wenche Frogn Sellæg
Preceded by Kristin Clemet	Norwegian Minister of Government Administration and Labour; 1990–1992	Succeeded by Oddny Aleksandersen
Civic offices
Preceded by Arild Eik (acting)	Director of the Norwegian Agency for Development Cooperation; 1997–2005	Succeeded by Poul Engberg-Pedersen
