= Rolf Gerhardsen =

Norwegian journalist and politician

- Born: Rolf Eileen Gerhardsen; 3 February 1902; Kristiania, Norway
- Died: 21 November 1971 (aged 69)
- Occupation: Journalist
- Family: Gerhard Olsen (father); Emma Hansen (mother); Einar Gerhardsen (brother)

Rolf Eilert Gerhardsen (3 February 1902 – 21 November 1971) was a Norwegian journalist and leader of the Oslo branch of the Norwegian Labour Party.

He was born in Kristiania as a son of Gerhard Olsen (1867–1949) and Emma Hansen (1872–1949). He was a brother of Einar Gerhardsen, and through him an uncle of Rune Gerhardsen and granduncle of Mina Gerhardsen.

He was a subeditor of Østfold Arbeiderblad and Sarpsborg Arbeiderblad from 1928 to 1934 and Vestfold Arbeiderblad from 1934 to 1940, and editor-in-chief of Den 1ste Mai in 1940. When the occupation of Norway by Nazi Germany started, Gerhardsen fled to Sweden where he edited the publication Norges-Nytt at the Norwegian legation in Stockholm. After the Second World War he was a subeditor in Arbeiderbladet from 1945 to 1952 and news editor from 1952 to 1970.

He also chaired the Oslo branch of the Norwegian Labour Party and was known as an anti-Communist. In post-World War II Norway he built up a private intelligence service on behalf of the Labour Party, the so-called Alpha Network. He was also chairman of the Norwegian News Agency. He released three books, including 1967's Einar Gerhardsen som en bror ser ham about his brother. He died in November 1971 in Oslo.
