= Marte Gerhardsen =

Norwegian politician and civil servant

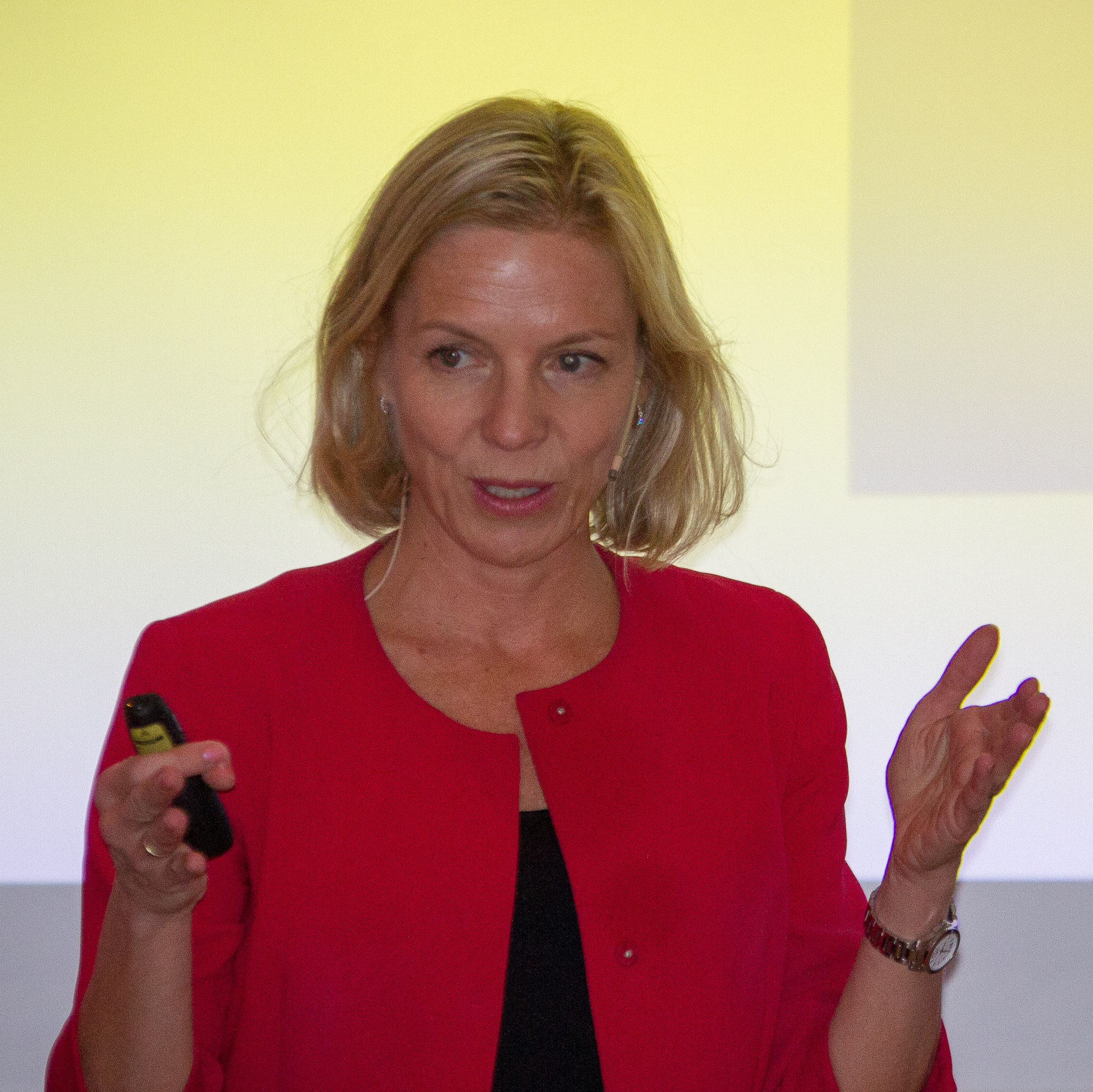
- Born: 21 July 1972 (age 53); Oslo, Norway
- Parent(s): Rune Gerhardsen (father); Tove Strand (mother); Einar Gerhardsen (grandfather)
- Relatives: Mina Gerhardsen (sister)

Marte Gerhardsen (born 21 July 1972) is a Norwegian civil servant, politician and organizational leader.

== Personal life ==
Marte Gerhardsen is a daughter of Rune Gerhardsen and Tove Strand, and sister of Mina Gerhardsen. She is thus a granddaughter of Einar Gerhardsen and Werna Gerhardsen.

== Career ==
From 2008 she was secretary general of the Norwegian chapter of the relief agency CARE. From April 2014 she headed the think-tank Agenda. She served as the director of the Oslo Education Agency from 2019 until she announced her retirement in February 2025. She had succeeded Astrid Søgnen, who had been forced to resign after internal disagreements.

In March 2025 she was appointed state secretary in the Støre Cabinet for Minister of Defence Tore O. Sandvik.
