= Harald Halvorsen =

Harald Halvorsen may refer to:

- Harald Halvorsen (gymnast)
- Harald Halvorsen (footballer)
- Harald Halvorsen (musician)
- Harald Halvorsen (politician)
