= Østfold Arbeiderblad =

Norwegian Labour Party newspaper, 1921–1929

Østfold Arbeiderblad was a newspaper published in Sarpsborg in Østfold county, Norway.

It was started in 1921 as the regional newspaper for the Norwegian Labour Party. In the same year the Labour Party had lost its newspaper in the region, Smaalenenes Social-Demokrat in Fredrikstad, which had changed allegiance to the Social Democratic Labour Party of Norway. Published in Sarpsborg, Østfold Arbeiderblad also had a correspondent's office in Halden. Editors include Nils Hønsvald from 1927 to 1929, and subeditors include Ola Brandstorp and Rolf Gerhardsen.

In 1927, the Labour Party and the Social Democratic Labour Party reunited. The Labour Party now had two newspapers in the region. Some wanted Smaalenenes Social-Demokrat to be the only one, but in Sarpsborg they wanted to keep a newspaper. Østfold Arbeiderblad was discontinued, and on 1 October 1929 the Labour Party started two new newspapers: Sarpsborg Arbeiderblad in Sarpsborg and Haldens Arbeiderblad in Halden.

From 1933 to 1937 the Communists had a newspaper in Sarpsborg which borrowed the name Østfold Arbeiderblad.
