= Fritz Huitfeldt =

Norwegian politician (1939–2022)

Fritz Huitfeldt (4 September 1939 – 27 October 2022) was a Norwegian lawyer and politician for the Conservative Party.

Huitfeldt held a cand.jur. degree. He worked in the Foundation for Student Life in Oslo from 1975 to 1987, and in Oslo Bolig- og Sparelag from 1992. He was elected to Oslo city council following the 1979 local elections, but was a deputy member from 1984. In 1989, he was appointed City Commissioner of the Boroughs in the city government of Hans Svelland. He left city politics in 1991, but returned as Chairman of the City Government in 1997. He served until 2000, and was then a councilman until 2003.

Huitfeldt died in Oslo, on 27 October 2022, aged 83.

Political offices
Preceded by Merete Johnson	Oslo City Commissioner of the Boroughs; 1989–1990	Succeeded by Ellen Christine Christiansen
Preceded by Rune Gerhardsen	Chairman of the City Government of Oslo; 1997–2000	Succeeded by Erling Lae
