= Tore Bernt Ramton =

Tore Bernt Ramton (18 October 1945 – 20 September 2010) was a Norwegian sports official.

From 1981 to 1985 he was the president of the Norwegian Skating Association. From 1987 he was a referee in speed skating European Championships, World Championships and Olympic Games, including the speed skating at the 2006 Winter Olympics. He represented the club Nesodden IF, and chaired Follo Speed Skating District for some time.

He resided in Kolbotn, and was involved in administration in the football section of Kolbotn IL. He has been called the "father of the Kolbotn girls", as he helped the women's football team of Kolbotn to become leading in Norway. He also chaired Oslo Football District from 1991 to 2003, and also the sports council in Oppegård municipality from 1989.

Outside of sports, he worked with spedition since 1965 and had his own company named Jacsped since 1980. He was an honorary member of both Nesodden IF and Kolbotn IL. He died from cancer in September 2010.

Sporting positions
Preceded by Børre Rognlien	President of the Norwegian Skating Association; 1981–1985	Succeeded by Bjørn Ruud
