= Terje Andersen =

Norwegian speed skater

Olympic medal record

Men's speed skating
| Bronze medal – third place | 1980 Lake Placid | 1500 m |

Terje Andersen (born 4 March 1952) is a former speed skater and president of the Norwegian Skating Association. Andersen was a typical middle distance skater, his best achievement being one bronze medal from the 1980 Winter Olympics of Lake Placid.

Andersen participated several times in the World Sprint Championships, finishing fourth in 1981, and sixth in 1978. His best placing in an allround championships is a twelfth place at the World Championships of Oslo in 1975.

He represented Tønsberg TF and Holmestrand og Botne SK. He was president of the Norwegian Skating Association from 1997 to 1999, and again in 2003 to 2007.

== Medals ==
An overview of medals won by Andersen at important championships he participated in, listing the years in which he won each:

| Championships | Gold medal | Silver medal | Bronze medal |
|---|---|---|---|
| Winter Olympics | – | – | 1980 (1,500 m) |
| World Allround | – | – | – |
| World Sprint | – | – | – |
| World Cup | – | – | – |
| European Allround | – | – | – |
| Norwegian Allround | – | – | 1975 |
| Norwegian Sprint | – | – | 1976; 1978 |

== Personal records ==
To put these personal records in perspective, the WR column lists the official world records on the dates that Andersen skated his personal records.

| Event | Result | Date | Venue | WR |
|---|---|---|---|---|
| 500 m | 38.30 | 31 March 1981 | Harbin | 36.91 |
| 1,000 m | 1:15.62 | 20 January 1980 | Davos | 1:13.60 |
| 1,500 m | 1:56.92 | 21 February 1980 | Lake Placid | 1:54.79 |
| 3,000 m | 4:18.8 | 1 December 1979 | Larvik | 4:04.06 |
| 5,000 m | 7:21.22 | 5 March 1976 | Inzell | 7:07.82 |
| 10,000 m | 15:37.11 | 2 January 1981 | Oslo | 14:26.71 |
| Big combination | 170.778 | 2 January 1981 | Oslo | 162.973 |

Andersen has an Adelskalender score of 168.250 points.

Sporting positions
| Preceded by Odd Pedersen | President of the Norwegian Skating Association; 1997–1999 | Succeeded by Finn Arne Bakke |
| Preceded by Rune Gerhardsen | President of the Norwegian Skating Association; 2003–2007 | Succeeded by Stein Rohde-Hanssen |
