= Olaf Poulsen (sports official) =

Norwegian sports official

Olaf Poulsen (27 July 1920 – 27 September 2008) was a Norwegian sports official, best known for serving as the president of the International Skating Union from 1980 to 1994.

Born in Kristiania, Poulsen was an active speed skater in his younger days. He represented the club Oslo IL, and eventually became involved in the administration of that club. He eventually became an honorary club member.

He became a member of the board of the Norwegian Skating Association in 1966, vice president in 1968 and president from 1969 to 1973. In the International Skating Union he was a board member from 1971, vice president from 1977 and president from 1980 to 1994. From 1992 to 1994 he was also a member of the International Olympic Committee. He retired after the 1994 Winter Olympics, held in his native country. He died on 27 September 2008.

Sporting positions
Preceded by Willy Reisvang	President of the Norwegian Skating Association; 1969–1973	Succeeded by Kjell Trystad
Preceded by Jacques Favart	President of the International Skating Union; 1980–1994	Succeeded by Ottavio Cinquanta
