= Hroar Elvenes =

Norwegian speed skater (1932–2014)

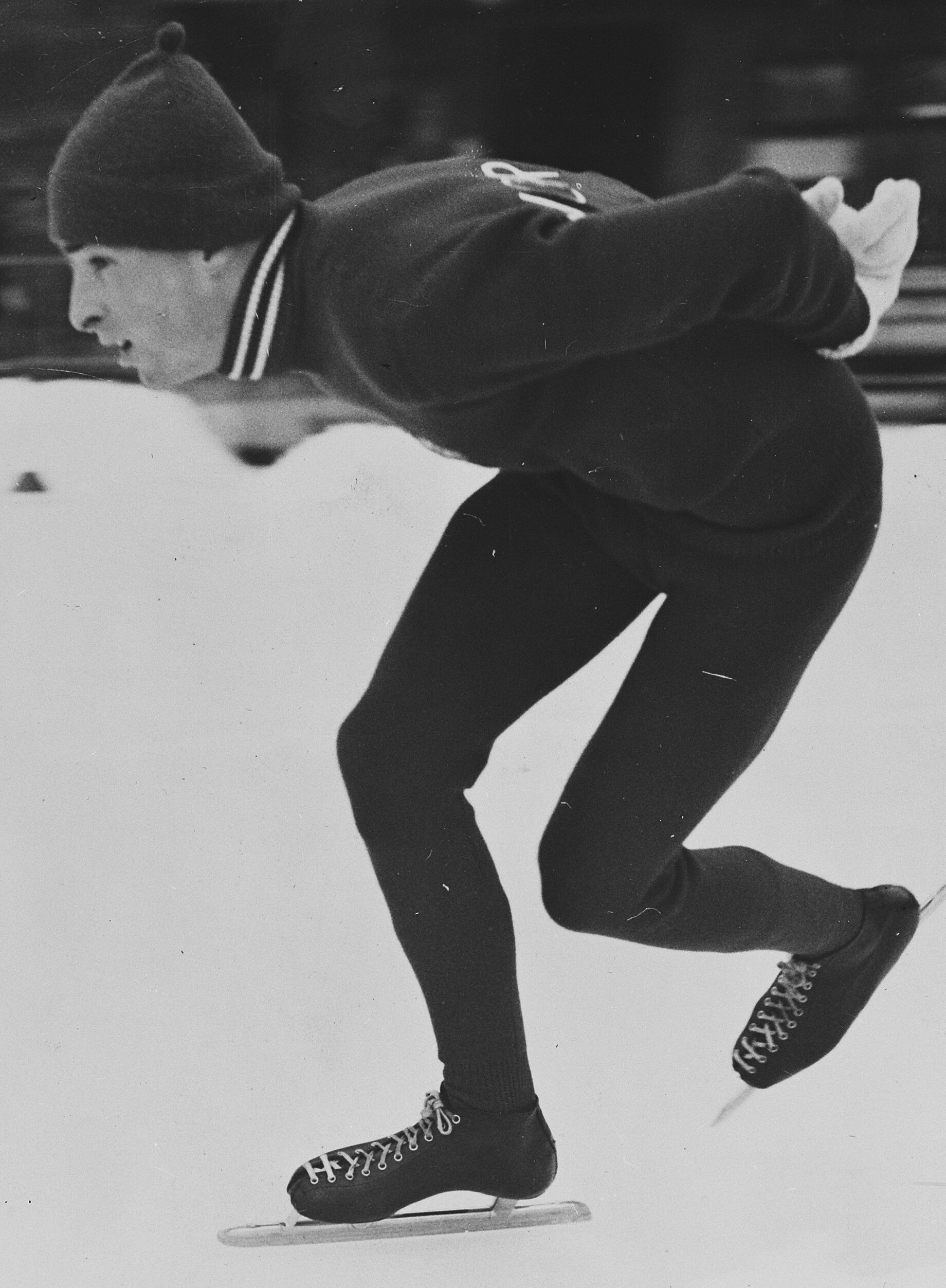
Hroar Elvenes

Hroar Elvenes (2 April 1932 – 4 December 2014) was a Norwegian former speed skater who competed in the 1952 Winter Olympics, in the 1956 Winter Olympics, in the 1960 Winter Olympics, and in the 1964 Winter Olympics.

He was born in Hakadal and represented the club Oslo IL.

In 1952 he finished sixth in the 500 metres competition. Four years later he finished 17th in the 500 metres event and 24th in the 1500 metres contest. At the 1960 Games he finished 14th in the 500 metres competition and 39th in the 1500 metres event. His final Olympic appearance was at the 1964 Winter Games when he finished tenth in the 500 metres contest.

He chaired the Norwegian Skating Association from 1975 to 1977. He died in December 2014.

Sporting positions
Preceded by Kjell Trystad	President of the Norwegian Skating Association; 1975-1977	Succeeded by Martin Holtung
