= Aksel Gresvig =

Norwegian track cyclist, sports administrator and businessman

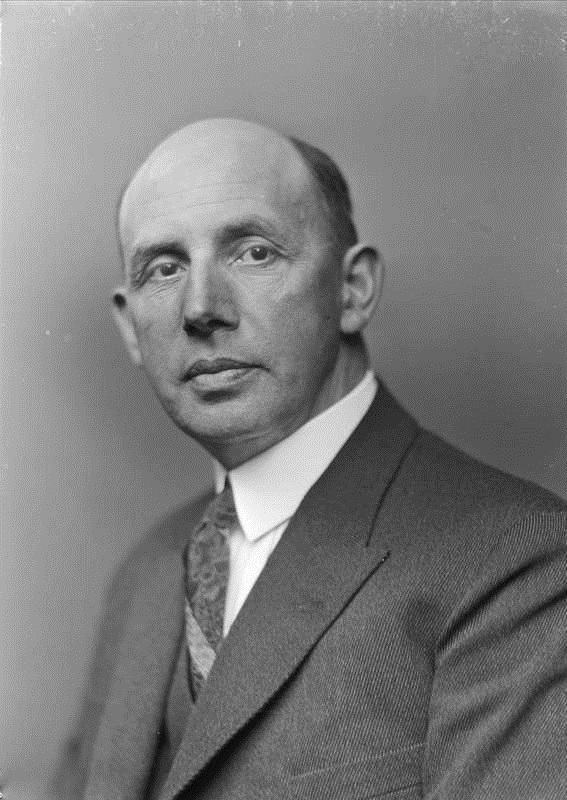
- Aksel Gresvig in 1926
- Born: 16 August 1876; Græsvig, Fredrikstad, Norway
- Died: 16 December 1958 (aged 82)
- Occupations: Track cyclist Sports administrator Businessman
- Awards: OBE

Aksel Gresvig OBE (16 August 1876 – 16 December 1958) was a Norwegian track cyclist, sports administrator, and businessman. He started a bicycle shop in Oslo in 1901, which later developed into the largest chain of sports shops in Scandinavia.

== Early and personal life ==
Aksel Johan Andersen was born in Græsvig in Onsø, a peninsula and then a municipality in Østfold, as the son of village shopkeeper Ole Andersen (1849–1883) and Randine Andersen (1849–1900). His father died when he was six years old, and the family moved to Fredrikstad, an important port for timber export. In 1887 the family moved to Kristiania. He adopted the name Gresvig when he was a candidate for confirmation. He married Ragnhild Helseth in 1914.

== Sports career ==
=== Active career as track cyclist ===
Gresvig bought his first bicycle in 1894. This was the start of his cycling career, and later career in sports business. He spent much time training at the area in front of the Akershus Fortress, and there he also met competition cyclists, including world champion Wilhelm Henie, as they used the area for training while the cycle racing track at Bygdøy converted from gravel to wooden tracks. Gresvig later exchanged his road bicycle for a track bicycle, and started to train at the Bygdøy velodrome. He won two Scandinavian championships in track cycling, in 1897 and 1900. He won three national championships, in 1897, 1898 and 1899. As a cyclist he represented Kristiania Velocipedklub.

=== Administrative career ===
Gresvig was board member of Christiania Skøiteklub from 1899, one year after the club's revival in 1898. He was vice chairman from 1905 to 1909 and chairman from 1909 to 1915, and was later appointed honorary member of the club. He chaired the Norwegian Skating Association from 1908 to 1911, and from 1915 to 1916. He was co-founder of Norsk Riksforbund for Idrett in 1910. He was president for Norges Cykleforbund from 1928 to 1929, and also president for Nordisk Sykkelforbund. In 1947 he co-founded Syklistenes Landsforening.

== Business career ==
Gresvig started working as junior clerk for the insurance company Glitne in 1893. He later worked at various sport shops, trading with bicycles, which had become his big interest. During this period he acquired knowledge about both the technical aspects of the bicycle, and the business part. In 1901 Gresvig started a cycle and sports shop in Oslo. In 1908 he also started production of bicycles, introducing the brands "Thor" and "Diamant". The company survived the difficult 1920s, and also expanded by taking over other companies. After his death the company continued to grow, developing into Gresvig ASA, which manages the sport chains G-Sport (about 220 shops), Super G and Intersport (about 110 shops).

== Honours ==
Gresvig was honorary member of Nordisk Sykkelforbund, Norges Sportshandleres Forbund and Syklistenens Landsforening. A festschrift was issued at his 75th anniversary, and his company's 50th anniversary, in 1951.

He was decorated Officer of the Order of the British Empire, and received the King's Medal of Merit, both for his negotiation of delivery of bicycle tyres and tubes from the United Kingdom to Norway during the First World War.

Sporting positions
Preceded by Arthur Motzfeldt	President of the Norwegian Skating Association; 1908–1911	Succeeded by Ludvig Albert Thue
Preceded by Ludvig Albert Thue	President of the Norwegian Skating Association; 1915–1916	Succeeded by Andreas Claussen
