= Norges-Nytt =

Norges-Nytt (Norwegian: Norway News) was a Norwegian magazine published from Stockholm from September 1941 by the Press Office of the Norwegian legation in Stockholm. It had a circulation of up to 40,000 copies.

Among the editors of Norges-Nytt were journalists Jørgen Juve (until 1942) and Rolf Gerhardsen. The last issue was #24, published in 1945.

== See also ==
- Håndslag
