= Børre Rognlien =

Norwegian politician

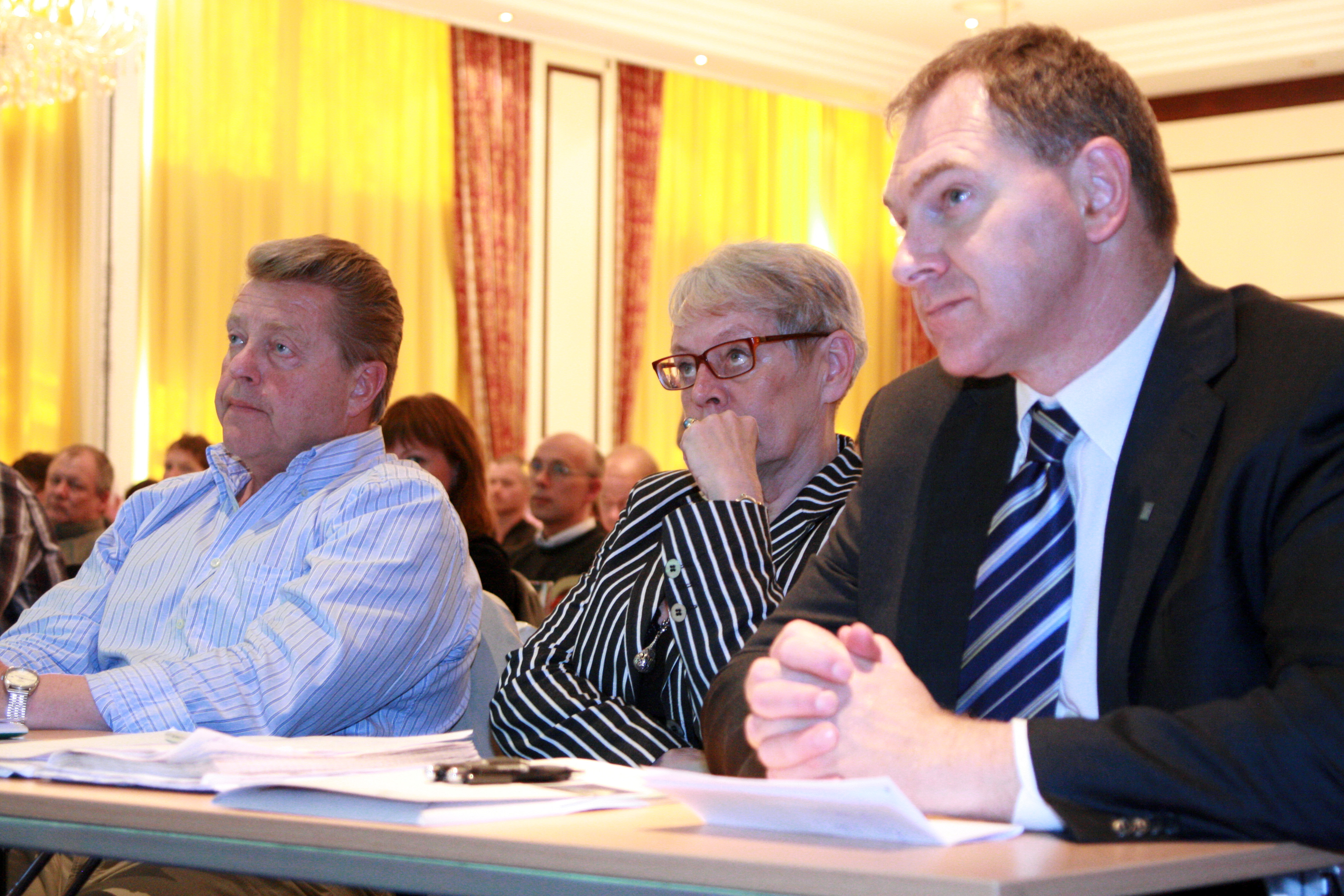
Rognlien (left)

Børre Rognlien (born 26 December 1944) is a Norwegian sports official and politician for the Conservative Party. He started his career as a journalist and military officer. He is best known for administrating speed skating, and as a politician he has been a member of the Parliament of Norway.

== Professional life and politics ==
He was born in Hurdal as a son of shop owners Bjarne Rognlien (1914–1988) and Annie Hagen (1916–1989). He started his career in the press, with a time as apprentice in Eidsvold Blad from 1963 to 1964 and journalist in United Press International from 1964 to 1966. For the next year he attended journalist school, from 1967 to 1973 he was subeditor in Forsvarets Pressetjeneste and from 1973 to 1974 he was news editor in Hamar Dagblad. Involved in the armed forces, he held the rank of Captain from 1975. He was an information director until 1991, when he became secretary-general of the Norwegian Institute of Public Accountants. He left in 1993, and from 1994 to 2006 he was secretary-general of the sports district of Oslo (Norwegian: Oslo Idrettskrets).

Rognlien also became involved in Oslo politics, as a borough council member of Oslo's Borough 18 from 1972 to 1973 and Oslo city council member from 1979 to 1983. In the city branch of the Conservative Party he was a board member from 1978 to 1994 (second deputy leader from 1992 to 1994) and leader of the party platform committee from 1984 to 1985. He was also a deputy representative to the Parliament of Norway from Oslo during the terms 1977–1981, 1981–1985 and 1993–1997. During Willoch's First and Second Cabinet in the 1980s Rognlien held a regular seat in Parliament, covering for Lars Roar Langslet from 1981 to 1983 and Jan P. Syse from 1983 to 1985. When Syse died in September 1997, Rognlien became a full representative for the short remainder of the term (by-elections do not exist in Norway).

== Sports ==
Rognlien founded the amateur boxing club Eidsvold BK in 1963, and was chairman until 1965, and was also a board member of the county's administrative body of team handball. He made his definite mark as a speed skating administrator. In the speed skating club Arbeidernes SK he was a board member from 1972 to 1975 and then chairman until 1977. From 1979 to 1981 he was president of the Norwegian Skating Association. From 1980 to 1982 he was a member of the Norwegian Olympic Committee. He was the leader of Short track speed skating at the 1994 Winter Olympics and a member of the main arranging committee of the 1999 Men's World Ice Hockey Championships (chairman), World Allround Speed Skating Championships for Men in 1979 (chairman), 1975, 1983, 1989 and 1993; the European Speed Skating Championships for Men in 1978 (chairman), 1976, 1982 and 1986; and the World Allround Speed Skating Championships for Women in 1980.

He later chaired the club Bøler IF from 1987 to 1991, was a board member of the Norwegian Tennis Federation from 2003 to 2006 and deputy vice president from 2007, and chairman of the sports district of Oslo from 2006 to 2009 (after his period as secretary-general). He was also a board member of the Norwegian Speed Skating Museum from 1995 and a deputy board member of the Norwegian School of Sport Sciences from 2009, in addition to Eidsvold Blad from 1989 to 1992 and Norsk Idrettsmedisinsk Institutt (NIMI) from 1999 to 2002. He was also a member of the committee that planned the new Bislett Stadion, opened in 2005.

He has been awarded with lifetime membership in the speed skating club Oslo SK, and became an honorary member of Hamar IL in 1990 and Arbeidernes SK in 1991. He was decorated by the Norwegian Confederation of Sports and the Bislett Alliance in 2006, and received the Medal of St. Hallvard in 2010. On 8 May 2011 he was elected as the new President of the Norwegian Confederation of Sports.

Sporting positions
Preceded by Tove Paule	President of the Norwegian Confederation of Sports; 2011–2015	Succeeded by Tom Tvedt
Preceded by Martin Holtung	President of the Norwegian Skating Association; 1979-1981	Succeeded by Tore Bernt Ramton
