= Agenda (think tank) =

Norwegian think tank

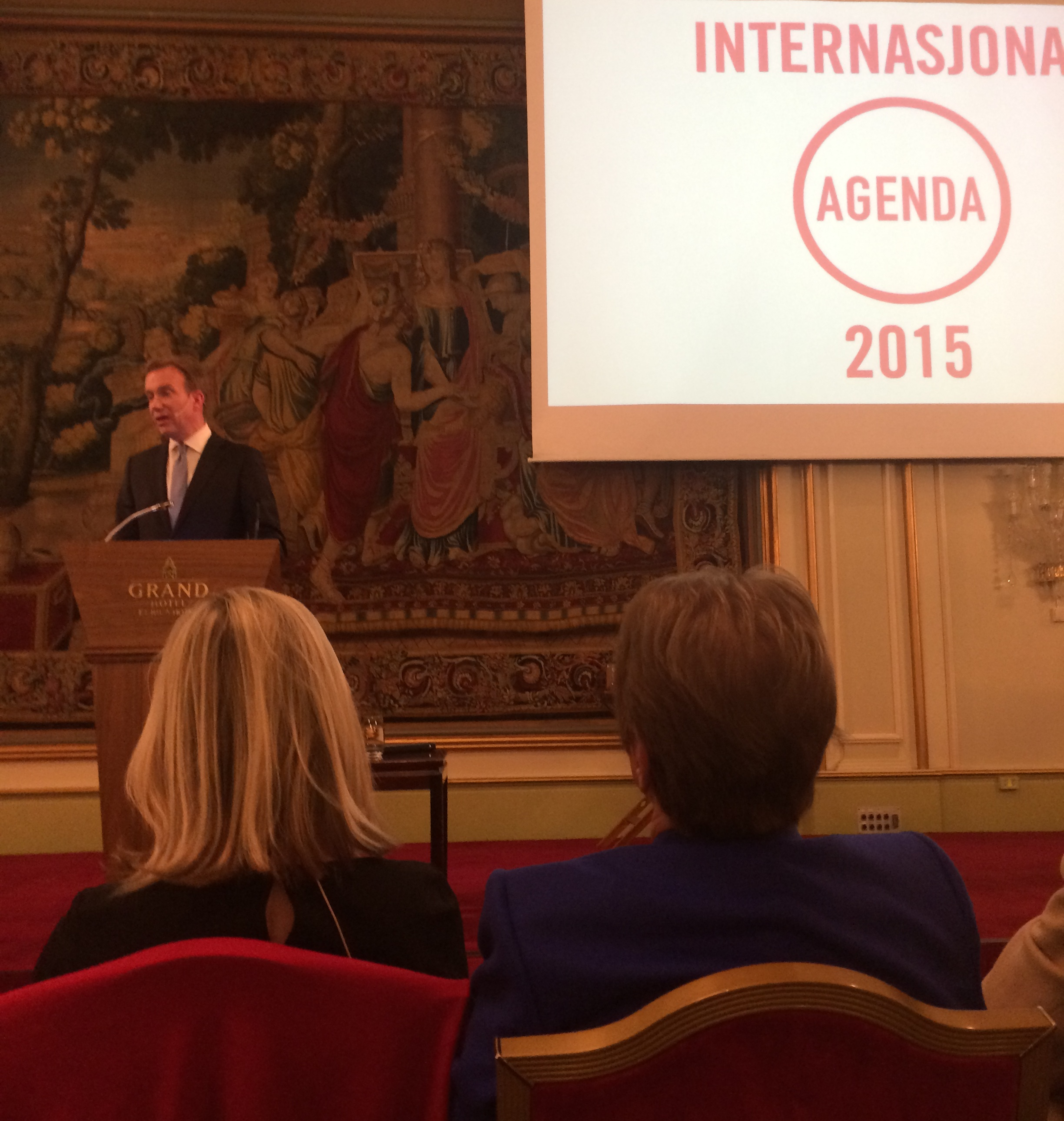
Agenda seminar in Oslo, January 2015. Foreign Minister Børge Brende speaks, while Agenda manager Marte Gerhardsen and former PM Gro Harlem Brundtland listen in.

Tankesmien Agenda is a Norwegian think tank established in 2014. Agenda is positioned in the center-left of Norwegian politics. Tarjei Skirbekk was the project leader for the establishment of the think tank after the parliamentary election in 2013 and until the summer of 2014. Agenda's first executive director, Marte Gerhardsen, led the organization for the first four years and was succeeded in 2018 by Trygve Svensson.

Raymond Johansen is the chairman of the board. He succeeded Anne Grete Strøm-Erichsen and lawyer Geir Lippestad. Hans-Christian Gabrielsen was a member of the board. Current board members include Mette Nord and Jørn Eggum.

== Purpose ==
According to Tankesmien Agenda's own website, the organization aims to be "a politically independent think tank that contributes to societal analysis and progressive policy development for center-left politics in Norway."

Tankesmien Agenda seeks to work towards a knowledge-based society with freedom for all. This assumes small differences, equal opportunities, high trust, and strong democratic institutions. It believes in universal freedom and opportunity to participate in community life, everyday life, and work on equal terms, regardless of one's origin, identity, or resources. It believes fair societal development requires continued growth and welfare, within the framework of climate goals and the limits of nature.

== Objectives and funding ==
Agenda is largely funded by its owner, LO, in addition to collaborative projects. The industrial leader and billionaire Trond Mohn owned 49% of the shares until 2021 and contributed significantly in the early years of the think tank.

The think tank's stated aim is to develop policies and analyses for center-left politics in Norway (or social democracy, according to Aftenposten). The focus of the research activities includes inequality, welfare economics, distribution, working life, and international politics.

== Staff ==
Trygve Svensson took over as leader in 2018 after Marte Gerhardsen, who had been the leader for four years. Svensson has a background as an advisor to CEO Eldar Sætre at Equinor, as a state secretary in the Ministry of Trade and Industry, and as an advisor to the Labour Party in the Parliament.

Other employees at Agenda include Hannah Gitmark, who is the deputy leader. She came from the position of political journalist at Dagsavisen and has previously worked as a journalist at Oppland Arbeiderblad.

== Events ==
In December 2014, Agenda hosted a visit from the French economist Thomas Piketty in Oslo. In front of a full audience at the University Aula, Piketty gave a lecture on his book Capital in the Twenty-First Century. In connection with Piketty's visit, Agenda published a short film about inequality in Norway. To mark the 10th anniversary of the book's release, Agenda also published a note titled Piketty, 10 Years Later.

The Aula events have become an annual tradition, and Agenda has organized "Agenda in the Aula" with speakers such as Zeynep Tufekci, Robert Putnam, Raj Chetty, and David Wengrow.
