= Alv Kjøs =

Norwegian politician

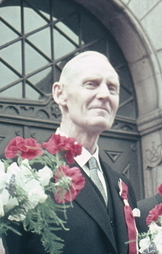
- Kjøs in 1964.

Vice President of the Storting
- In office 6 October 1961 – 30 September 1965
- President: Nils Langhelle
- Preceded by: Nils Hønsvald
- Succeeded by: Nils Langhelle

President of the Odelsting
- In office 18 January 1958 – 30 September 1961
- Vice President: Peder N. L. Jacobsen; Jakob M. Pettersen
- Preceded by: C. J. Hambro
- Succeeded by: Per Borten

Leader of the Conservative Party
- In office 1954–1962
- Preceded by: C. J. Hambro
- Succeeded by: Sjur Lindebrække

Member of the Norwegian Parliament
- In office 1 January 1937 – 30 September 1965
- Constituency: Hedmark

Personal details
- Born: 4 June 1894 Løiten, Norway
- Died: 14 April 1990 (aged 95)
- Party: Conservative
- Occupation: Army officer and farmer

Alv Kjøs (4 June 1894 – 14 April 1990) was a Norwegian army officer and politician for the Conservative Party.

== Early life and military career ==
He was born in Løiten Municipality in Hedmark county, the son of farmers Andreas Olsen Kjøs and Dina Baardsdatter.

Having achieved his examen artium academic certification in 1914, he graduated from the upper section of the Norwegian Military Academy in 1917. Upon graduating, he joined the infantry of the 2nd Division as a first lieutenant. He first served in the 6th Infantry Regiment, before transferring to the 5th Infantry Regiment in 1921.

== Political career ==
He was elected to the Norwegian Parliament from Hedmark in 1937, and was re-elected on five occasions. From 1958 to 1961 he was President of the Odelsting, and from 1961 to 1965 he was Vice President of the Storting.

On the local level, Kjøs was a member of the municipal council of Løten Municipality from 1931 to 1945. He chaired the municipal party chapter from 1930 to 1934, and the county chapter from 1937 to 1946. From 1954 to 1962 he chaired the party nationwide.

== Second World War ==
During the German invasion of Norway in 1940, the major Kjøs fought in Southern and Northern Norway. When officers were arrested as prisoners-of-war in 1942 during the occupation of Norway by Nazi Germany Kjøs was imprisoned in Grini concentration camp from April. In August 1943 he was transferred to Grune in Germany (now: Poland), later to Schildberg and Luckenwalde. In 1946 he was promoted to colonel. Besides his military career he was a farmer.

He was decorated as a Commander with Star of the Order of St. Olav in 1964.

Party political offices
Preceded by C. J. Hambro	Chairman of the Norwegian Conservative Party; 1954–1962	Succeeded by Sjur Lindebrække
