= Jan Dijkema =

Dutch politician (born 1944)

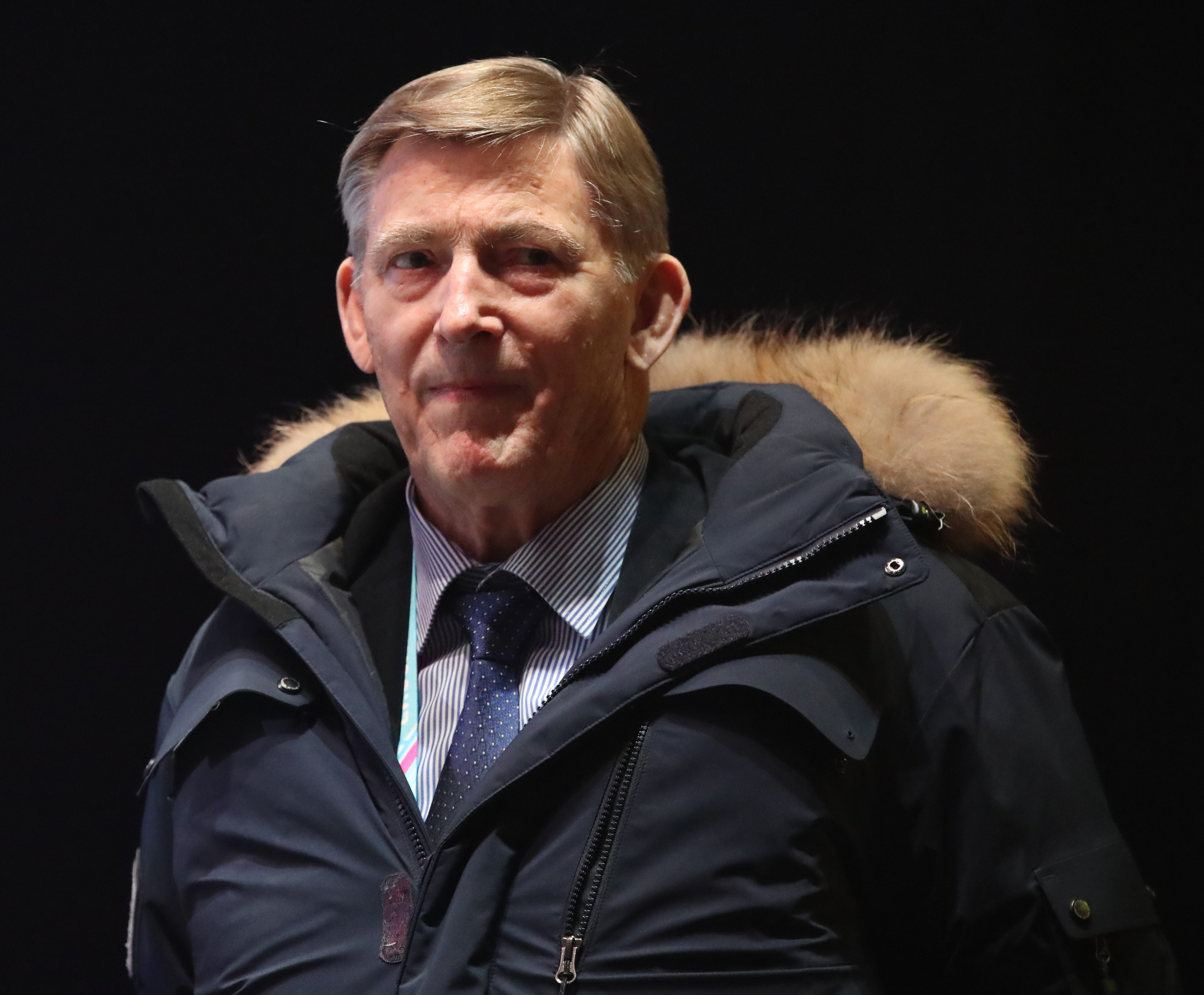
- Jan Dijkema (2020)

11th President of the International Skating Union
- In office 10 June 2016 – 10 June 2022
- Preceded by: Ottavio Cinquanta
- Succeeded by: Kim Jae-youl

Personal details
- Born: 23 September 1944 (age 81) Schipborg, Aa en Hunze, Netherlands
- Occupation: Politician

Jan Dijkema (born 23 September 1944) is a Dutch politician, sociologist, and former President of the International Skating Union.

== Career ==
Dijkema studied sociology at the University of Groningen and was at the age of 32 in 1978 the youngest member of the Dutch government. In the province of Overijssel he was then a member of the provincial government for economic affairs as representative on behalf of the PvdA, where he was confronted with the restructuring of Twente after the textile crisis: "We were able to do a lot with European funds." In addition, Dijkema was closely involved in financing the IJsbaan Twente as a member of the recommendation committee. In 1994 he exchanged politics for skating as a vice-president at the Royal Dutch Skating Association (KNSB). In that capacity, he became a representative at the International Skating Union (ISU). From 1994 to 2010 he held the position of ISU board member. In 2010, he became vice president of speed skating at ISU.

In 2016 Dijkema was elected president of the International Skating Union during the congress in Dubrovnik as successor to the retiring Italian Ottavio Cinquanta. His term was extended by four years in June 2018.

In April 2018, Dijkema was appointed WADA Foundation Board Member representing the winter sports federations and in November 2019, he was appointed by the IOC as a Member of the Coordination Commission for the 2026 Winter Olympics.

With Dijkema as president, the ISU focused on three strategic pillars:

Development: a further development of the skating sport worldwide in all ISU disciplines: figure skating, speed skating, short track speed skating and synchronized skating. The aim is to increase the quantity and quality of skaters, coaches and officials worldwide and to increase the number of ISU Members capable to develop skaters who are competitive at ISU Events and the Olympic Winter Games. In 2016, a new and result-oriented Development Program (ISU Communication No. 2052) and a Development Commission were established, focused amongst others on educating coaches and officials via e-learning, encouraging transition from other sports to ice skating, educating talents and the establishment of ISU Centres of Excellence.

Marketing and promotion: aimed at increasing the ISU disciplines' global fan base and its engagement. From the start of Dijkema's presidency, the ISU is building a new fan-centric cross-media strategy, (especially) showcasing the skaters. Another focus is increasing attractiveness of calendar and event formats. An example is the addition of Mixed Gender Relay in short track to the program of the Olympic Winter Games in 2022. Further, Dijkema has been able to create new partnerships with media partners as well as commercial partners.

Good governance: Integrity, transparency, inclusiveness and sustainable development are key values in Dijkema's governance of the skating sport. Furthermore, Dijkema facilitated the installation of the ISU Athletes Commission. "This way, a new generation is getting ready to eventually take over the lead."

Sporting positions
Preceded by Ottavio Cinquanta	President of the International Skating Union; 2016–2022	Succeeded by Kim Jae-youl
