= Ola Brandstorp =

Ola Johan Brandstorp (4 September 1902 – 10 December 1963) was a Norwegian journalist, sports official, politician for the Labour Party and military officer.

In 1923, Brandstrop joined the Labour Party and started working for the newspaper Østfold Arbeiderblad, starting as a subeditor in 1924. He chaired the Østfold District of Workers' Sports from 1927 to 1929, served on the national of Arbeidernes Idrettsforbund, and represented Arbeidernes Idrettsforbund at the Fourth Congress of the Red Sport International in 1928. From 1931, he was an office manager in Arbeidernes Idrettsforbund, and in 1933, he became editor of the monthly magazine Arbeideridrett until it ceased publication in January 1935.

During the war, and the German occupation of Norway, Brandstorp was a member of Milorg. He was also involved with Hjemmefrontens Ledelse. He was arrested by Gestapo but fled to Sweden where he was a secretary in the Norwegian legation in Stockholm from 1944 to 1945. After the war. Brandstorp was hired in the Norwegian Ministry of Defence. He held the military rank of colonel when, in 1947, he became the first leader of Armed Forces' Education and Welfare Corps. He left in 1962 and worked for the Norwegian Armed Forces Museum for a short time before his death in late 1963.

== Pre-war career ==
He was born in Skjeberg, and had middle school education and petty officer training. He joined the Labour Party in 1923. In the same year he was hired in the office of the newspaper Østfold Arbeiderblad, where he started a journalistic career in 1924 as subeditor. He later worked for Arbeiderbladet in the years leading up to World War II. In Østfold Brandstorp chaired the Østfold District of Workers' Sports from 1927 to 1929, and was a national board member of Arbeidernes Idrettsforbund. He represented Arbeidernes Idrettsforbund at the Fourth Congress of the Red Sport International in 1928, together with Thorvald Olsen, Thor Jørgensen, Natvig Pedersen and Eigil Eriksen. Brandstorp was elected to the Red Sport International executive committee, replacing Thor Jørgensen.

He supported the membership of Arbeidernes Idrettsforbund in the Red Sport International at the time. However, in the spring of 1929, Brandstorp wrote an article in Den Røde Ungdom where he suggested that AIF should withdraw from the Red Sport International. He was now afraid that worker-sportsmen in Norway viewed the Red Sport International as a communist organization and thus refrained from participating in workers' sports. The article sparked a debate, and at a Red Sport International executive plenary meeting in Kharkov in May–June, in which Brandstorp participated, he was ordered to resign from the executive committee. Arbeidernes Idrettsforbund interpreted this move as an ultimatum. The November 1929 national convention of Arbeidernes Idrettsforbund voted in favour of retaining membership in the Red Sport International, but demanded that the International would not interfere in the links between Arbeidernes Idrettsforbund and the Labour Party and Norwegian Trade Union Confederation. According to the decision passed at the conference, Arbeidernes Idrettsforbund became subordinated to these two bodies. Brandstorp was elected new editor of the workers' sports magazine Arbeideridrett. Arbeideridrett went defunct in 1930. From 1931 he was an office manager in Arbeidernes Idrettsforbund.

A communist workers' sports federation, Kampforbundet for Rød Sportsenhet, was eventually formed in Norway. Brandstorp participated in merger negotiations between Arbeidernes Idrettsforbund and Kampforbundet for Rød Sportsenhet in 1933. Also in 1933, Arbeideridrett resurfaced as a monthly magazine with Brandstorp as editor. It finally ceased publication in January 1935.

== World War II ==
During the war, and the German occupation of Norway, Brandstorp was a member of Milorg. He was also involved with Hjemmefrontens Ledelse. He was arrested by Gestapo, but managed to flee to Sweden where he was a secretary in the Norwegian legation in Stockholm from 1944 to 1945.

== Post-war career ==
After the war Brandstorp was hired in the Norwegian Ministry of Defence. He held the military rank of colonel when he in 1947 became the first leader of Forsvarets undervisnings- og velferdskorps, an organization for the general well-being of military servicemen off duty. In 1946 he had chaired a committee that looked into whether this was needed, and he was later a member of other committees. He left in 1962, and worked for the Norwegian Armed Forces Museum for a short time before dying in late 1963.
