= List of presidents of the Odelsting =

List of presidents of the Odelsting, the one chamber of the Parliament of Norway from 1945 to 2009, when the chamber was discontinued.

No.	Portrait	President	Took office	Left office	Time in office	Party
1	C. J. Hambro	C. J. Hambro (1885–1964)	10 December 1945	10 January 1958	12 years, 31 days	Conservative
2	Alv Kjøs	Alv Kjøs (1894–1990)	18 January 1958	30 September 1961	3 years, 255 days	Conservative
3	Per Borten	Per Borten (1913–2005)	6 October 1961	30 September 1965	3 years, 359 days	Centre
4	Nils Hønsvald	Nils Hønsvald (1899–1971)	8 October 1965	30 September 1969	3 years, 357 days	Labour
5	Håkon Johnsen	Håkon Johnsen (1914–1991)	8 October 1969	30 September 1973	3 years, 357 days	Labour
(3)	Per Borten	Per Borten (1913–2005)	9 October 1973	30 September 1977	3 years, 356 days	Centre
6	Asbjørn Haugstvedt	Asbjørn Haugstvedt (1926–2008)	11 October 1977	30 September 1981	3 years, 354 days	Christian Democratic
7	Arne Nilsen	Arne Nilsen (born 1924)	15 October 1981	30 September 1985	3 years, 350 days	Labour
8	Åshild Hauan	Åshild Hauan (1941–2017)	9 October 1985	30 September 1989	3 years, 356 days	Socialist Left
9	Inger Lise Gjørv	Inger Lise Gjørv (1938–2009)	10 October 1989	30 September 1993	3 years, 355 days	Labour
10	Gunnar Skaug	Gunnar Skaug (1940–2006)	11 October 1993	30 September 2001	7 years, 354 days	Labour
11	Ågot Valle	Ågot Valle (born 1945)	9 October 2001	30 September 2005	3 years, 356 days	Socialist Left
12	Berit Brørby	Berit Brørby (born 1950)	10 October 2005	30 September 2009	3 years, 355 days	Labour
