= Herman Pedersen =

Norwegian politician and diplomat

Herman Pedersen (21 May 1928 – 24 January 2009) was a Norwegian diplomat and politician for the Labour Party.

He was born in Vestre Toten Municipality as a son of Asbjørn Pedersen (1897–1983) and housewife Hanna Nøkleby (1897–1992). He studied political science at the University of Oslo and Yale University, and also had an UNESCO scholarship to stay in Latin America before being hired as a secretary in the Norwegian Ministry of Foreign Affairs in 1958. He made a career in the system and was hired as an embassy secretary in Poland in 1960, and went on to the United Nations delegation from 1962 to 1965.

He served as a deputy representative to the Parliament of Norway from Oslo during the term 1965–1969. He met on a regular basis in October 1965, before Einar Gerhardsen returned from his position as prime minister. In total Pedersen met during one year and 106 days of parliamentary session. From 1966 to 1968 Pedersen was a member of the Labour Party international committee, and also chaired the Norwegian-Polish Association. From 1966 to 1969 he was a deputy board member of the Norwegian Institute of International Affairs. His day job between 1965 and 1969 was as a foreign news editor.

He served as an embassy counsellor in the United Kingdom from 1970 to 1978, then as a sub-director in the Ministry of Foreign Affairs from 1979 to 1988, before becoming an ambassador. From 1988 to 1993 he was the Norwegian ambassador to most of Southern Africa (notably except South Africa), to Zimbabwe, Angola, Botswana, Lesotho and Swaziland; since 1989 also to Mozambique. From 1993 to his retirement in 1995 he was the Norwegian ambassador to Cyprus and Israel. He was decorated as a Knight, First Class of the Royal Norwegian Order of St. Olav in 1990.
