= Per Borten =

Norwegian politician (1913–2005)

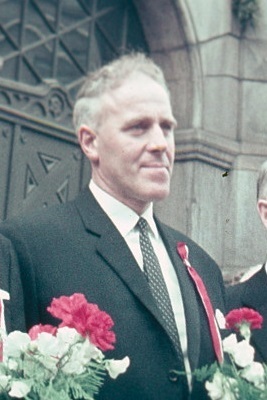
- Borten in 1964

Prime Minister of Norway
- In office 12 October 1965 – 17 March 1971
- Monarch: Olav V
- Preceded by: Einar Gerhardsen
- Succeeded by: Trygve Bratteli

Member of the Norwegian Parliament
- In office 1 January 1950 – 30 September 1977
- Constituency: Sør-Trøndelag

President of the Odelsting
- In office 9 October 1973 – 30 September 1977
- Vice President: Aase Lionæs
- Preceded by: Håkon Johnsen
- Succeeded by: Asbjørn Haugstvedt
- In office 6 October 1961 – 30 September 1965
- Vice President: Jakob Martin Pettersen
- Preceded by: Alv Kjøs
- Succeeded by: Nils Hønsvald

Personal details
- Born: 3 April 1913 Flå, Søndre Trondhjem, Norway
- Died: 20 January 2005 (aged 91) Trondheim, Norway
- Party: Centre
- Spouse: Magnhild Borten (1922–2006)
- Children: Kari Borten

Per Borten (3 April 1913 – 20 January 2005) was a Norwegian politician from the Centre Party and the prime minister of Norway from 1965 to 1971. Per Borten is credited for leading the modernization of what was then named Bondepartiet (the Agrarian Party) into today's Centre Party. He was an active opponent of Norway joining the European Union.

== Early life ==
Borten was born in Flå Municipality (in the present-day Melhus Municipality) in Sør-Trøndelag county, and was educated as an Agriculturist at the Norwegian College of Agriculture in 1939. He started his political career serving as mayor of his home municipality, Flå, from 1945 to 1955. He was elected to the Norwegian parliament in 1949 and stayed there until his retirement in 1977. Borten was President of the Odelsting 1961–1965 and 1973–1977.

== Political career ==
He was appointed president of the Odelsting, acted as the parliamentary leader for his party, and served as its chairman from 1955 to 1967. As Prime Minister of Norway from 1965, he headed a four-party centre-right coalition government, until 17 March 1971, when the government dissolved itself. He resigned as Prime Minister when it became known that he had shown confidential information about Norway in the negotiations concerning European Economic Community membership, with, amongst others, Arne Haugestad, then leader of the People's Movement against Norwegian membership of the EEC.

Borten's time as Prime Minister of Norway saw the enactment of a range of progressive reforms. Earnings-related pensions were introduced in 1966, while under a June 1969 law the Housing Bank offered loans for improving old dwellings. The Special Supplement to National Insurance Benefits Law of June 1969 established a special supplement for those not entitled to supplementary pensions, and the Law on Compensation Supplement to National Insurance Benefits of December 1969 introduced a supplement to compensate for the introduction of a value-added tax system. The Basic Schooling Law of June 1969 introduced 9-year comprehensive schooling, while under another law passed that same year, family allowances were extended to the first child under the age of 16, while single-parent families were provided with one extra allowance in addition to the number of children.

== Later life ==
After his retirement from politics, Borten continued to speak out on issues such as nuclear disarmament, clandestine surveillance, and the controversy on Norway's relationship to the European Union. He served on the boards of several public banking organizations. He earned a reputation for being an engaging and somewhat contrarian figure in the Norwegian political landscape.

His down-to-earth nature had been strongly underlined in 1969, when newspaper Dagbladet interviewed him at his farm while he was prime minister. He did the interview wearing nothing but a pair of shoes, a hat and trunks, only days before Queen Elizabeth II was invited to the same farm on a state visit to Norway. The picture of Borten in his underwear went around the world, and the British newspaper Daily Mirror printed the picture over two pages with the headline: Now the Norwegian Prime Minister is ready to receive the Queen.

Another popular story was when Borten's Defence Minister, Otto Grieg Tidemand, invited him and others to a private dinner. After eating, Tidemand surprised his guests with the finest vintage brandy. Without blinking Borten responded by pouring the brandy into his coffee, making himself karsk.

Borten died at St. Olav's Hospital in Trondheim at the age of 91. He was buried at Flå Church in Melhus Municipality. His wife Magnhild died on 2 June 2006, aged 84.

Political offices
Preceded by Einar Gerhardsen	Prime Minister of Norway; 1965–1971	Succeeded by Trygve Bratteli
Preceded by Håkon Johnsen	President of the Odelsting; 1973–1977	Succeeded by Asbjørn Haugstvedt
Preceded by Alv Kjøs	President of the Odelsting; 1961–1965	Succeeded by Nils Hønsvald
