= Werna Gerhardsen =

Norwegian politician (1912–1970)

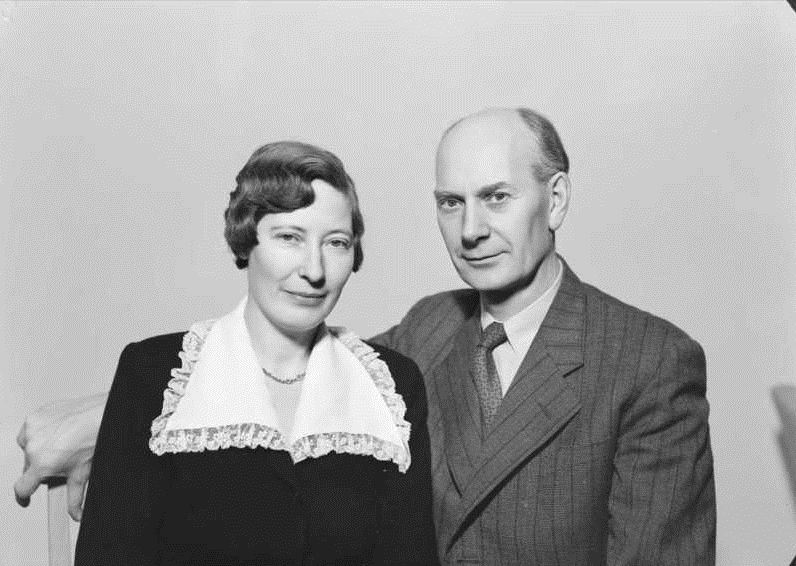
- Werna with her husband Einar in 1950.
- Born: Werna Julie Koren Christie; 6 August 1912
- Died: 11 January 1970 (aged 57)
- Occupation: Politician
- Spouse: Einar Gerhardsen (1932–1970; her death)
- Children: 3
- Parent(s): Johan Werner Koren Christie (father); Klara Rønning (mother)

Werna Julie Gerhardsen, née Koren Christie (6 August 1912 – 11 January 1970) was a Norwegian politician for the Labour Party, best known as the wife of Prime Minister Einar Gerhardsen.

Gerhardsen was born in 1912 to Johan Werner Koren Christie (1879–1918) and Klara Rønning (1889–1967). She married Einar Gerhardsen in October 1932. They had a son Rune Gerhardsen and granddaughter Mina Gerhardsen. She is a sister-in-law of Rolf Gerhardsen. She was a member of Oslo school board, and Oslo city council from 1947. She was also a board member of the Norwegian National Opera and the Norwegian National Academy of Theatre, a supervisory council member of the National Theatre and a council member of Oslo Nye Teater.

Gerhardsen allegedly cooperated with Soviet Union for much of her husbands time in office as the Prime Minister. According to a retired KGB officer, she passed on NATO and other secrets to the KGB.
