= Willy Reisvang =

Norwegian sports official

Willy Reisvang (23 May 1923 – 17 February 2001) was a Norwegian sports official.

He chaired the club Oslo SK from 1958 to 1962, 1963 to 1966, and 1972 to 1976. From 1966 to 1969 he was the president of the Norwegian Skating Association. He was a board member of the Norwegian Olympic Committee from 1968 to 1984, and also chairman of the Norwegian Skating Museum, which has been called his "life work".

He was decorated with the King's Medal of Merit. He spent his working career outside of sports in the companies Jiffy-Pot and Strøm-Stål, and resided in Billingstad.

Sporting positions
Preceded by Roald Vatn	President of the Norwegian Skating Association; 1966–1969	Succeeded by Olaf Poulsen
