= Andreas Claussen =

Norwegian barrister, civil servant and politician (1883–1957)

Andreas Claussen (4 July 1883 – 24 October 1957) was a Norwegian barrister, civil servant and politician for the Liberal Party.

== Early life and career ==
He was born in Trondheim as the son of hotelier Peter Albert Claussen (1854–1920) and Cecilie Ingbertine Debes (1852–1931). The family hotel, Hotel Britannia, was founded by his mother and her first husband. Claussen studied law after finishing his secondary education in 1902; graduating with the cand.jur. degree in 1907. He opened his own attorney's office in Trondhjem in 1910. In September 1916 he married Annie Amalie Schaanning (1892–1965). He was also a competitive figure skater during his younger days, and later chaired the Norwegian Skating Association from 1916 to 1918 and 1919 to 1922 as well as Trondhjems Skøiteklub. He was also a member of the Sports Committee of 1935, which prepared a merger between the sports confederations in Norway.

== Career ==
From 1920 to 1922 he was a member of the national Housing Law Commission. In 1924, Claussen became a barrister with license to work with Supreme Court cases. He served as a member of Trondheim city council from 1929 to 1931, representing the Liberal Party. In 1931 he was appointed as the new State Conciliator of Norway. At the same time he continued his work as a barrister, from 1936 in companionship with Reidar Selmer.

=== World War II ===
In April 1940, Nazi Germany invaded and occupied Norway, and the regular political authorities were put out of the running. Johan Cappelen, County Governor of Sør-Trøndelag and later resistance member, set up the so-called Central Committee of Trondheim to administer the city, headed by Claussen together with Cappelen and Ivar Skjånes. The Central Committee was disbanded in the autumn by the Nazi authorities. Claussen continued as a barrister, but also became involved in resistance work. He was arrested on 3 August 1942 for "anti-German sentiments", and was incarcerated at Grini two days later, and released six days before the liberation of Norway on 8 May 1945.

=== Post-war career ===
After the war he resumed his normal work, but his last day in office as State Conciliator of Norway was on 31 December 1945. He resigned in protest to the government's law about forced salary commission. He was succeeded by wartime resistance leader Paal Berg. In the meantime Claussen had negotiated the merger between the Norwegian Confederation of Sports and the Workers' Confederation of Sports.

From 1947 to 1953 he worked as a public prosecutor in Trondheim District Court. In the same time period he also served a second term in the city council. He was a member of the board of Trøndelag Teater as well as several private companies, including Trondhjem Cementstøperi, Trondhjems Kullkompagni, Trondhjems Preservering & Co. and Norske Forenede Forsikring. Claussen was decorated as a Commander with Star of the Royal Norwegian Order of St. Olav. He survived a sea plane crash in 1948, in which Bertrand Russell was involved as well, but died in October 1957 in Trondheim.

Civic offices
Preceded by Valentin Voss	State Conciliator of Norway; 1931–1945	Succeeded by Paal Berg
Sporting positions
Preceded by Aksel Gresvig	President of the Norwegian Skating Association; 1916–1918	Succeeded by Knut Ørn Meinich
Preceded by Knut Ørn Meinich	President of the Norwegian Skating Association; 1919–1922	Succeeded by Knut Ørn Meinich
