= Norwegian Skating Association =

Ice skating governing body in Norway

- Formation: 27 February 1893
- Type: Sports association
- Headquarters: Oslo, Norway
- Members: 7,000
- Official language: Norwegian
- President: Nils Einar Aas
- Website: www.skoyteforbundet.no

The Norwegian Skating Association (Norwegian: Norges Skøyteforbund, NSF) is the main skating authoritative body in Norway. It oversees speed skating, figure skating, short track speed skating on ice, and more recently inline and roller skating.

The Norwegian Skating Association was founded on 27 February 1893 and currently has about 7,000 members. It is a member of the Norwegian Olympic Committee and Confederation of Sports, the International Skating Union (ISU), and Federation International de Roller Skating (FIRS).

The NSA publishes a magazine named Skøytesport.

== Past presidents ==
This is a list of former presidents of the Norwegian Skating Association:

- 1893–1894 : Hans Ditlev Alexander Fabricius
- 1894–1895 : Arthur Motzfeldt
- 1895–1896 : Peder Bredo Brodersen
- 1896–1897 : Hans Ditlev Alexander Fabricius
- 1897–1898 : Arthur Motzfeldt
- 1898–1900 : Henrik Olsen Biørn Homan
- 1900–1901 : Arthur Motzfeldt
- 1901–1902 : Olaf Norseng
- 1902–1903 : Arthur Motzfeldt
- 1903–1903 : Karl Ingvar Nandrup
- 1903–1904 : Arthur Motzfeldt
- 1904–1906 : Ivar Hellesnes
- 1906–1907 : Christopher Fougner
- 1907–1908 : Arthur Motzfeldt
- 1908–1911 : Aksel Gresvig
- 1911–1915 : Ludvig Albert Thue
- 1915–1916 : Aksel Gresvig
- 1916–1918 : Andreas Claussen
- 1918–1919 : Knut Ørn Meinich
- 1919–1922 : Andreas Claussen
- 1922–1925 : Knut Ørn Meinich
- 1925–1926 : Ivar Hellesnes
- 1926–1927 : Yngvar Bryn
- 1927–1929 : Anders Melteig
- 1929–1931 : Kristian Strøm
- 1931–1931 : Oskar Viktor Olsen
- 1931–1932 : Anders Melteig
- 1932–1937 : Gerhard Karlsen
- 1937–1938 : Magnus Johansen
- 1938–1940 : Henning August Olsen
- 1940–1940 : Ole Nils Tveter
- 1940–1945 : German occupation of Norway
- 1945–1946 : Ole Nils Tveter
- 1946–1949 : Reidar Gudmundsen
- 1949–1952 : Oskar Viktor Olsen
- 1952–1954 : Harald Halvorsen
- 1954–1956 : Nils W. Simensen
- 1956–1961 : Armand Carlsen
- 1961–1965 : Georg Krog
- 1965–1966 : Roald Vatn
- 1966–1969 : Willy Reisvang
- 1969–1973 : Olaf Poulsen
- 1973–1975 : Kjell Trystad
- 1975–1977 : Hroar Elvenes
- 1977–1979 : Martin Holtung
- 1979–1981 : Børre Rognlien
- 1981–1985 : Tore Bernt Ramton
- 1985–1986 : Bjørn Ruud
- 1986–1990 : Rune Gerhardsen
- 1990–1997 : Odd Pedersen
- 1997–1999 : Terje Andersen
- 1999–2001 : Finn Arne Bakke
- 2001–2003 : Rune Gerhardsen
- 2003–2007 : Terje Andersen
- 2007–2008 : Stein Rohde-Hanssen
- 2008–2013 : Vibecke Sørensen
- 2013–2017 : Rune Gerhardsen
- 2017–2025 : Mona Adolfsen
- 2025–present : Nils Einar Aas
