= Nils Herlitz =

Swedish politician

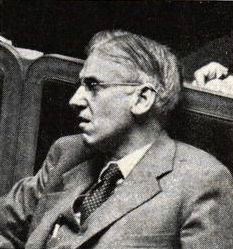
Nils Herlitz in 1948.

Nils Herlitz (7 August 1888 – 9 February 1978) was a Swedish historian, legal scholar and politician of the Conservative Party. He served as the third President of the Nordic Council in 1955. He served as a member of the upper house of the Swedish parliament from 1939 to 1955.

Herlitz was elected a corresponding fellow of the British Academy in 1971.

== Awards and decorations ==
- (Sweden) Commander Grand Cross of the Order of the Polar Star (21 November 1963)

== Honours ==
- Honorary doctorate, University of Oslo, 1961
