= Harald Halvorsen (footballer) =

Norwegian footballer (1898–1992)

Personal information
- Date of birth: 29 November 1898
- Date of death: 17 March 1992 (aged 93)

International career
Years	Team	Apps	(Gls)
1925	Norway	1	(0)

Harald Halvorsen (29 November 1898 – 17 March 1992) was a Norwegian footballer. He played in one match for the Norway national football team in 1925.

Sporting positions
Preceded by Oskar Olsen	President of the Norwegian Skating Association; 1952–1954	Succeeded by Nils W. Simensen
