= Østfold Arbeiderblad (Communist newspaper) =

Norwegian Communist Party newspaper, 1933–1937

Østfold Arbeiderblad was a Norwegian newspaper, published in Sarpsborg in Østfold county.

== History and profile ==
Østfold Arbeiderblad was started as a weekly newspaper in 1933 as the Communist Party of Norway organ in the county. It went defunct in December 1937 as a consequence of the party's decision to prop up the main newspaper Arbeideren.
