= Mina Gerhardsen =

Norwegian politician (born 1975)

Personal details
- Born: 14 September 1975 (age 50) Oslo, Norway
- Party: Labour
- Spouse: Eirik Øwre Thorshaug
- Parent(s): Rune Gerhardsen (father); Tove Strand (mother)
- Relatives: Marte Gerhardsen (sister)
- Occupation: Politician

Mina Gerhardsen (born 14 September 1975) is a Norwegian civil servant and former politician for the Labour Party. In May 2024 she was appointed by the Norwegian government for the position as the next Children's ombudsman in Norway.

She is the daughter of Rune Gerhardsen and Tove Strand, and granddaughter of Einar Gerhardsen. She is married to Eirik Øwre Thorshaug.

She led the Oslo branch of Natur og Ungdom from 1993 to 1995, and was deputy leader of the Workers' Youth League in Oslo in 1997. She took the cand.mag. degree at the University of Oslo in 1998, and also has master's degrees in pedagogy from 2000 and human geography from 2003. From 1999 to 2002 she worked part-time as a journalist in Dagsavisen and Dagbladet. She then worked in the Norwegian Red Cross from 2002 to 2004, except for a period from 2003 to 2004 as a journalist in Mandag Morgen.

She was hired as a political advisor in the Norwegian Office of the Prime Minister in 2005, when Stoltenberg's Second Cabinet assumed office. In 2009 she was promoted to State Secretary. In 2011 she changed to the Ministry of Culture.

She is a staunch advocate for the prohibition of cannabis and is known in Norway for authoring frequent opinion pieces on the matter. In 2017 she left her post as director of Actis, a Norwegian association for organizations related to substance abuse.

In May 2024, she was nominated to be next Children's Ombudsman of Norway, succeeding Inga Bejer Engh, who had been appointed assistant director of the Norwegian Police Security Service.
