= Sarpsborg Arbeiderblad =

Norwegian newspaper

- Type: Daily newspaper
- Format: Tabloid
- Owner(s): A-pressen
- Editor: Bernt Frode Lyngstad
- Founded: 1929
- Political alignment: Labour Party; Non-partisan
- Headquarters: Sarpsborg, Norway
- Circulation: 13,595
- Website: www.sa.no

Sarpsborg Arbeiderblad is a local newspaper in Sarpsborg, Norway. It is published six days a week. The chief editor is Bernt Frode Lyngstad.

It was established in 1929, after the demise of Østfold Arbeiderblad, and was affiliated with the Labour Party. However, the newspaper ultimately became non-partisan. It was stopped between October 1940 and May 1945, during the German occupation of Norway.

It has a circulation of 13,595, of whom 13,345 are subscribers. It is published by the company Sarpsborg Arbeiderblad AS, which is owned 100% by A-pressen.
