= Rune Gerhardsen =

Norwegian politician and sports leader (1946–2021)

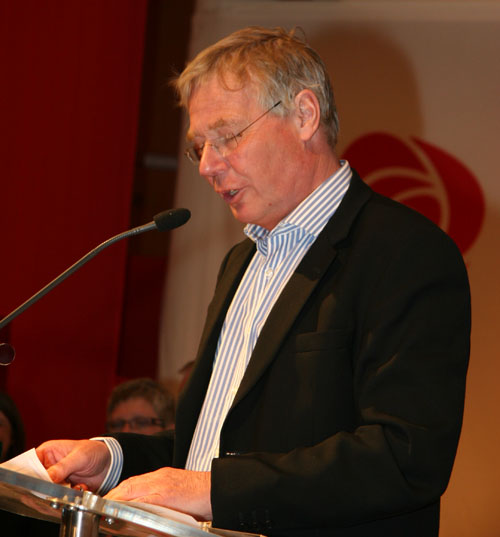
- Gerhardsen in 2007

Leader of the Workers' Youth League
- In office 1973–1975
- Preceded by: Bjørn Tore Godal
- Succeeded by: Sissel Rønbeck

3rd Governing Mayor of Oslo
- In office 1 January 1992 – 15 January 1997
- Mayor: Ann-Marit Sæbønes; Per Ditlev-Simonsen
- Preceded by: Michael Tetzschner
- Succeeded by: Fritz Huitfeldt

Chair of the Norwegian Skating Association
- In office 9 June 2013 – 16 June 2017
- Preceded by: Vibecke Sørensen
- Succeeded by: Mona Adolfsen
- In office 2001–2003
- Preceded by: Finn Arne Bakke
- Succeeded by: Terje Andersen
- In office 1986–1990
- Preceded by: Bjørn Ruud
- Succeeded by: Odd Pedersen

Personal details
- Born: 13 June 1946 Oslo, Norway
- Died: 4 September 2021 (aged 75) Oslo, Norway
- Party: Labour
- Spouse: Tove Strand (m. 1968, div. 1996)
- Children: Marte; Mina
- Parent(s): Einar Gerhardsen (father); Werna Gerhardsen (mother)
- Occupation: Politician

Rune Gerhardsen (13 June 1946 – 4 September 2021) was a Norwegian politician, representing the Norwegian Labour Party, and sports leader at Norwegian Skating Association representing Aktiv SK.

== Biography ==
Gerhardsen was a son of Werna and Einar Gerhardsen, and attended Oslo Cathedral School. He chaired the Workers' Youth League from 1973 to 1975 and served as Oslo’s governing mayor from 1992 to 1997.

He chaired the Norwegian Skating Association from 1986 to 1990, again from 2001 to 2003 and for a third time from 2013 to 2017.

Gerhardsen died of Alzheimer's disease at Nordseterhjemmet in Oslo on 4 September 2021, surrounded by his closest family. He was 75.

== Personal life ==
Gerhardsen was married to Tove Strand in 1968 (divorced in 1996) and they had two daughters, Marte and Mina.

== Selected works ==
- Snillisme på norsk. Oslo: Schibsted. 1991. ISBN 9788251614009. OCLC 473471704.
- Du er faren min likevel?. Oslo: Aschehoug. 2002. ISBN 9788203228155. OCLC 237797755.

Party political offices
Preceded by Bjørn Tore Godal	Chairman of the Workers' Youth League; 1973–1975	Succeeded by Sissel Rønbeck
Political offices
Preceded by Michael Tetzschner	Chairman of the City Government of Oslo; 1992–1997	Succeeded by Fritz Huitfeldt
Sporting positions
Preceded by Finn Arne Bakke	President of the Norwegian Skating Association; 1986–1990	Succeeded by Odd Pedersen
Preceded by Bjørn Ruud	President of the Norwegian Skating Association; 2001–2003	Succeeded by Terje Andersen
Preceded by Vibecke Sørensen	President of the Norwegian Skating Association; 2013–2017	Succeeded by Mona Adolfsen
