= Einar Gerhardsen =

Prime minister of Norway (1945–1951, 1955–1963, 1963–1965)

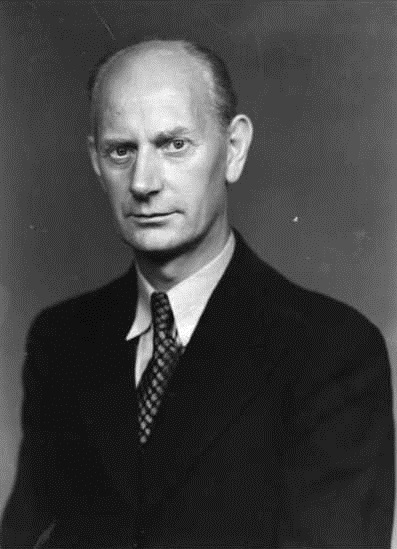
- Gerhardsen in 1945

Prime Minister of Norway
- In office 25 September 1963 – 12 October 1965
- Monarch: Olav V
- Preceded by: John Lyng
- Succeeded by: Per Borten
- In office 22 January 1955 – 28 August 1963
- Monarchs: Haakon VII; Olav V
- Preceded by: Oscar Torp
- Succeeded by: John Lyng
- In office 25 June 1945 – 19 November 1951
- Monarch: Haakon VII
- Preceded by: Johan Nygaardsvold
- Succeeded by: Oscar Torp

President of the Storting
- In office 16 January 1954 – 22 January 1955
- Monarch: Haakon VII
- Prime Minister: Oscar Torp
- Preceded by: Gustav Natvig-Pedersen
- Succeeded by: Oscar Torp

Leader of the Labour Party
- In office 28 May 1945 – 27 May 1965
- Preceded by: Oscar Torp
- Succeeded by: Trygve Bratteli

President of the Nordic Council
- In office 1 January 1954 – 31 December 1954
- Preceded by: Hans Hedtoft
- Succeeded by: Nils Herlitz

Member of the Norwegian Parliament
- In office 4 December 1945 – 30 September 1969
- Deputy: Hjalmar Larsen; Aase Lionæs; Gunnar Alf Larsen; Herman Pedersen
- Constituency: Oslo

Personal details
- Born: Einar Henry Olsen; 10 May 1897 Asker, Akershus, United Kingdoms of Sweden and Norway
- Died: 19 September 1987 (aged 90) Oslo, Norway
- Resting place: Vestre Gravlund
- Party: Labour
- Spouse: Werna Gerhardsen (m. 1932; died 1970)
- Children: 3, including Rune
- Profession: Civil servant Road worker

Einar Henry Gerhardsen (10 May 1897 – 19 September 1987) was a Norwegian politician who served as the prime minister of Norway from 1945 to 1951, 1955 to 1963 and 1963 to 1965. With a total of 17 years in office, he is the longest-serving prime minister in Norway since the introduction of parliamentarism. He was the leader of the Labour Party from 1945 to 1965.

Many Norwegians often refer to him as "Landsfaderen" (Father of the Nation); he is generally considered one of the main architects of the post-war rebuilding of Norway after World War II. He also served as the second president of the Nordic Council in 1954.

== Biography ==
=== Early life ===
Einar Gerhardsen was born in the municipality of Asker, in the county of Akershus. His parents were Gerhard Olsen (1867–1949) and Emma Hansen (1872–1949). His father was rodemester' roadworker ' in Public Roads Administration and was foreman of a trade union committee, fanekomiteen for Veivesenets arbeiderforening, and during Gerhardsen's childhood the trade union's leader, Carl Jørgensen, frequently visited their home, and sometimes they would sing The Internationale and Seieren følger våre faner ("victory follows our banners").

In 1932, he married Werna Julie Koren Christie (1912–1970), daughter of agent Johan Werner Koren Christie and Klara Rønning. The couple had two sons, Truls and Rune and a daughter Torgunn. His brother was Rolf Gerhardsen and the pair also had a lifelong working relationship. From the age of seventeen, Gerhardsen attended meetings with the Labour Party's youth movement. In 1918, during the Finnish Civil War, Gerhardsen resigned his membership of the Church of Norway after the church sided with the "Whites" against the "Reds".

=== Political work, imprisonment ===
Originally a road worker, Gerhardsen became politically active in the socialist labour movement during the 1920s. He was convicted several times of taking part in subversive activities until he, along with the rest of the Labour Party, gradually moved from communism to democratic socialism. He participated in the Left Communist Youth League's military strike action of 1924. He was convicted for assisting in this crime and sentenced to 75 days in prison.

By the mid-1930s, Labour was a major force on the national political scene, becoming the party of government under Prime Minister Johan Nygaardsvold from 1935 until the Nazi invasion in 1940. Gerhardsen was elected to Oslo city council in 1932 and became deputy mayor in 1938. He was deputy leader of the Labour Party from 1939.

After the German occupation of Norway in 1940, Gerhardsen became acting Chairman of the Labour Party, as the chairman, Oscar Torp had gone into exile. Gerhardsen became Mayor of Oslo on 15 August 1940, but was forced to resign by the Germans on 26 August the same year. In September, the Nazi occupation government banned all parliamentary political parties, including the Labour Party.

During World War II, Gerhardsen took part in the organised resistance against the German occupation of Norway, and was arrested on 11 September 1941. Having already been under suspicion for a long time, Gerhardsen had been detained and subjected to interrogations on 31 previous occasions since the summer of 1940. Initially he was sent to Grini concentration camp in Norway. In February 1942, he was accused of leading resistance work from his imprisonment, and removed from the camp for interrogation. Initially interrogated at the police station at Møllergata 19, he was soon transferred to the Gestapo headquarters at Victoria Terrasse. At Victoria Terrasse, he was tortured to reveal information on the resistance, but did not give in. In April 1942, he was sent to Sachsenhausen concentration camp in Germany. In September 1944, he was transferred back to Grini, where he spent the rest of the war.

After the war, Gerhardsen formed the interim government which sat from the end of the occupation in May 1945 until the general election held in October the same year. The election gave Labour an absolute majority in Parliament, the Storting, which it retained until 1961. Gerhardsen served as President of the Storting from 10 January 1954 to 22 January 1955.

=== Domestic and foreign policy from 1945 ===
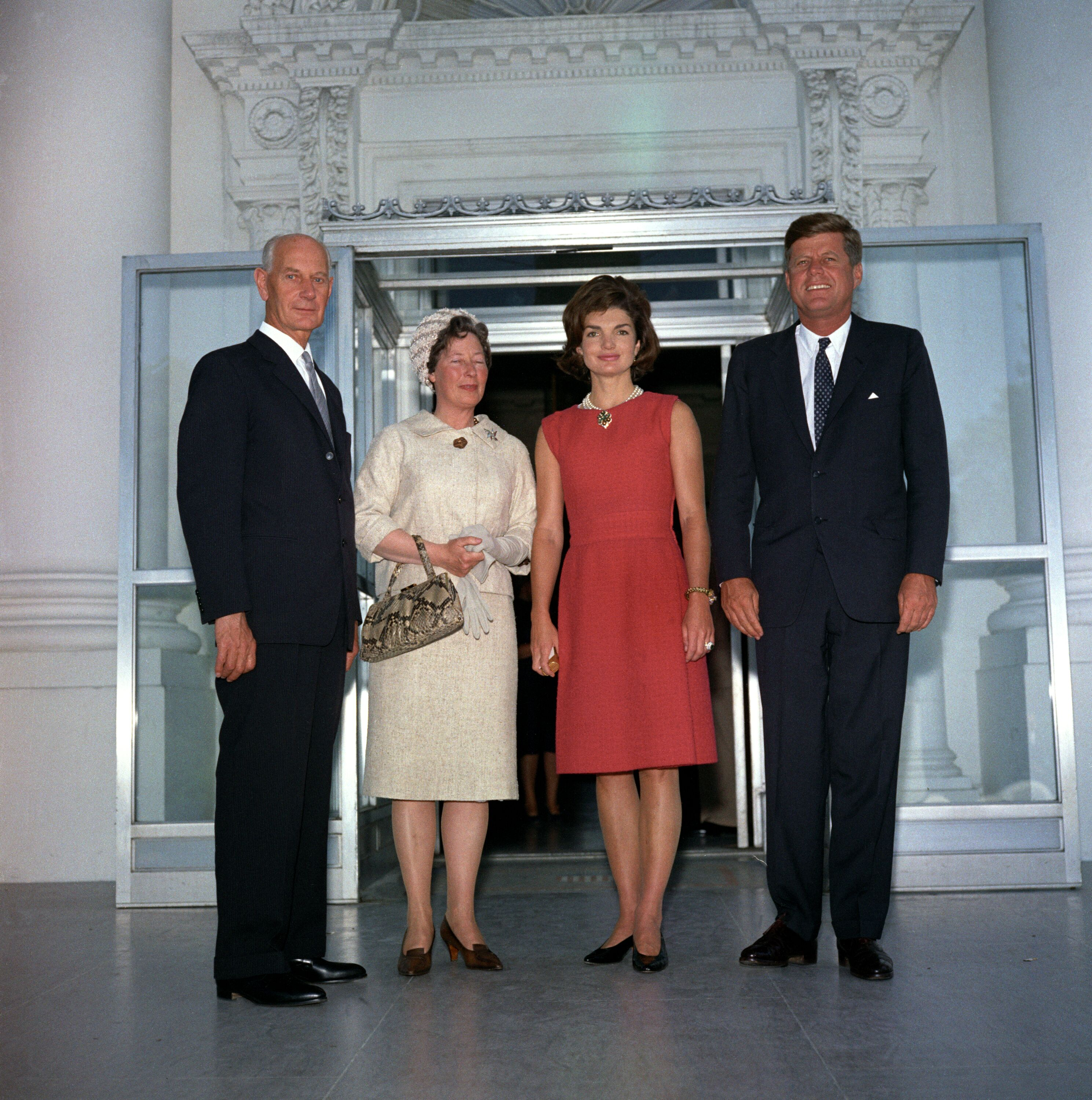
Gerhardsen and Werna Gerhardsen with President John F. Kennedy and First Lady Jacqueline Kennedy in 1962

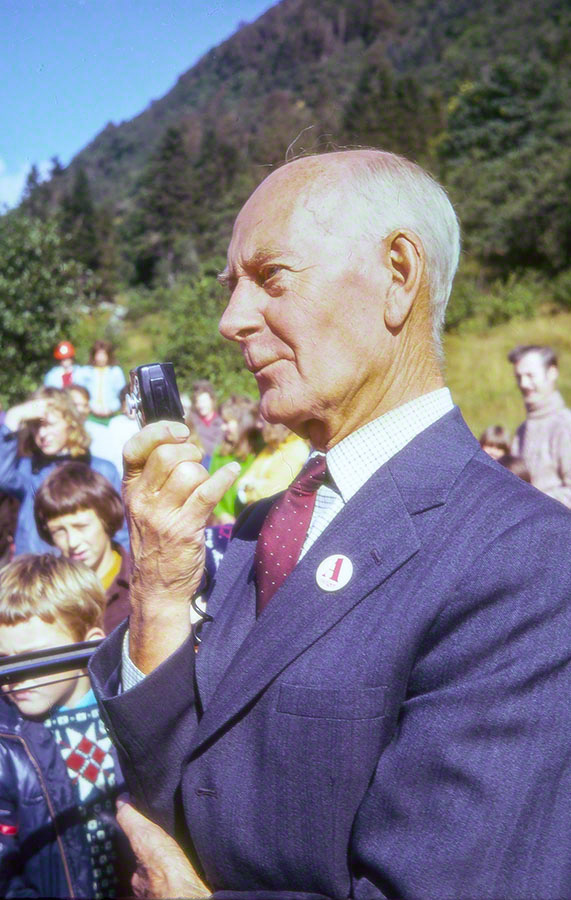
Gerhardsen at a political rally in Bergen in the late-1960s

During and after his periods in office, he was greatly respected by the people; even those not sharing his social democratic views. The administrations he led forged an eclectic economic policy in which government regulation of commerce, industry and banking. Abject poverty and unemployment were sharply reduced by his government's policies of industrialisation and redistribution of wealth through progressive taxation, together with the creation of a comprehensive social security system.

The Norwegian State Housing Bank Law of March 1946 introduced relatively cheap loans for co-operative housing societies and individual private builders. The Child Allowances Law of October 1946 introduced allowances for second and subsequent children under the age of sixteen years, while also providing allowances for single-parent families for the birth of their first child. Under a July 1947 law, unemployment insurance coverage was extended to agricultural workers and certain other groups. In 1947, a loan fund for students was introduced. That same year, housing allowances were introduced for families with two or more children below the age of sixteen years, "who live in dwellings financed through Housing Bank and in municipalities which pay one-third of the allowance." The Comprehensive Schooling Law of July 1954 established nine-year comprehensive schooling on a trial basis, while the Sickness Insurance Law of March 1956 introduced compulsory insurance for all residents. A law in January 1960 introduced an invalidity pension scheme and a law of June 1961 extended accident coverage to military personnel and conscripts. In 1957, universal basic pensions were introduced. In 1957 an orphans' pension scheme was established, and in 1958 university occupational injury insurance was introduced. In 1957, housing allowances were made available for single-parent families with children, and that same year, and income and property means test was introduced while the Housing Allowances Law was made compulsory for all municipalities. In 1964, a national widow's benefit was introduced.

In foreign policy, Gerhardsen aligned Norway with the Western powers at the end of the 1940s after some initial hesitation within the governing party. He denounced Norwegian communists in the Kråkerøy speech in 1948, and had Norway become a founding member of NATO in 1949. Documents from 1958 reveal that the Gerhardsen's government knew that Israel was going to use heavy water supplied by Noratom for plutonium production, making it possible for Israel to produce nuclear weapons.

In November 1962, an accident in which 21 miners died occurred in the Kings Bay coal mine on Spitsbergen in the Svalbard archipelago. In the aftermath, the Gerhardsen government was accused of not complying with laws enacted by parliament. In the summer of 1963 a vote of no confidence passed with the support of the Socialist People's Party and a centre-right minority coalition government was formed, under John Lyng. Although this new government lasted only three weeks, until the Socialist People's Party realigned itself with Labour, it formed the basis for an opposition victory under the leadership of Per Borten at the 1965 general election. Gerhardsen retired from national politics in 1969 but continued to influence public opinion through writing and speeches.

Gerhardsen's political legacy is still an important force in Norwegian politics, especially within his own party, although some of the social policies of his government have been revised. (See also Economy of Norway)

=== Soviet intelligence claim ===
According to Vassili Mitrokhin, Gerhardsen became a Soviet intelligence operative during his visit to the USSR.

=== Later life and death ===
Gerhardsen spent the last years of his life in Oslo, where he died on 19 September 1987, at the age of 90. He was buried in the Vestre Gravlund,

=== Honours ===
- Knight Grand Cross of the Order of St Michael and St George, 1955

== See also ==
- Johan Nygaardsvold
- Oscar Torp

Political offices
Preceded by Trygve Nilsen	Mayor of Oslo; 1940	Succeeded by Rolf Stranger
Preceded by Rolf Stranger	Mayor of Oslo; 1945	Succeeded by Rolf Stranger
Preceded by Johan Nygaardsvold^{1}	Prime Minister of Norway; 1945–1951	Succeeded by Oscar Torp
Preceded by Oscar Torp	Prime Minister of Norway; 1955–1963	Succeeded by John Lyng
Preceded by John Lyng	Prime Minister of Norway; 1963–1965	Succeeded by Per Borten
Party political offices
Preceded by Martin Tranmæl	Party secretary of the Labour Party; 1923–1925	Succeeded by Martin Tranmæl
Preceded by Martin Tranmæl	Party secretary of the Labour Party; 1936–1939	Succeeded by Ole Øisang
Preceded by Oscar Torp	Chairman of the Labour Party; 1945–1965	Succeeded by Trygve Bratteli
