= Frank Murud =

Norwegian fraudster

- Born: December 23, 1955 (age 70)
- Occupation: Prisoner
- Status: Incarcerated
- Criminal charges: embezzlement and corruption
- Penalty: sentenced to 7 years in prison

Frank Murud (born 23 December 1955) is a former chief of real estate in the city administration of Oslo, who became notorious for the embezzlement of ca. 89,5 million NOK from the company Undervisningsbygg, which is responsible for constructing and maintaining public schools in Oslo.

== Embezzlement of public school funds ==
As a city employee from 2003 to 2006, Frank Murud handed out jobs worth 89,5 million NOK to a friend and business partner in the company Håndverkekspressen.

== Previous embezzlement ==
In the years 1999-2003, Murud embezzled c. 9,2 million NOK from the company Neas AS.

== Criminal conviction ==
When his embezzlement was revealed, Frank Murud confessed in both cases.

In 2007, he was convicted of embezzlement and corruption and sentenced to 7 years in prison, he was also barred from engaging in independent form of trade for life, and convicted to return 112 million NOK. He appealed his sentence, but it was upheld by the Higher Court and the Supreme Court.

Murud is married and has two sons and a daughter.
