= Art gallery =

Place where art is exhibited and sometimes also sold

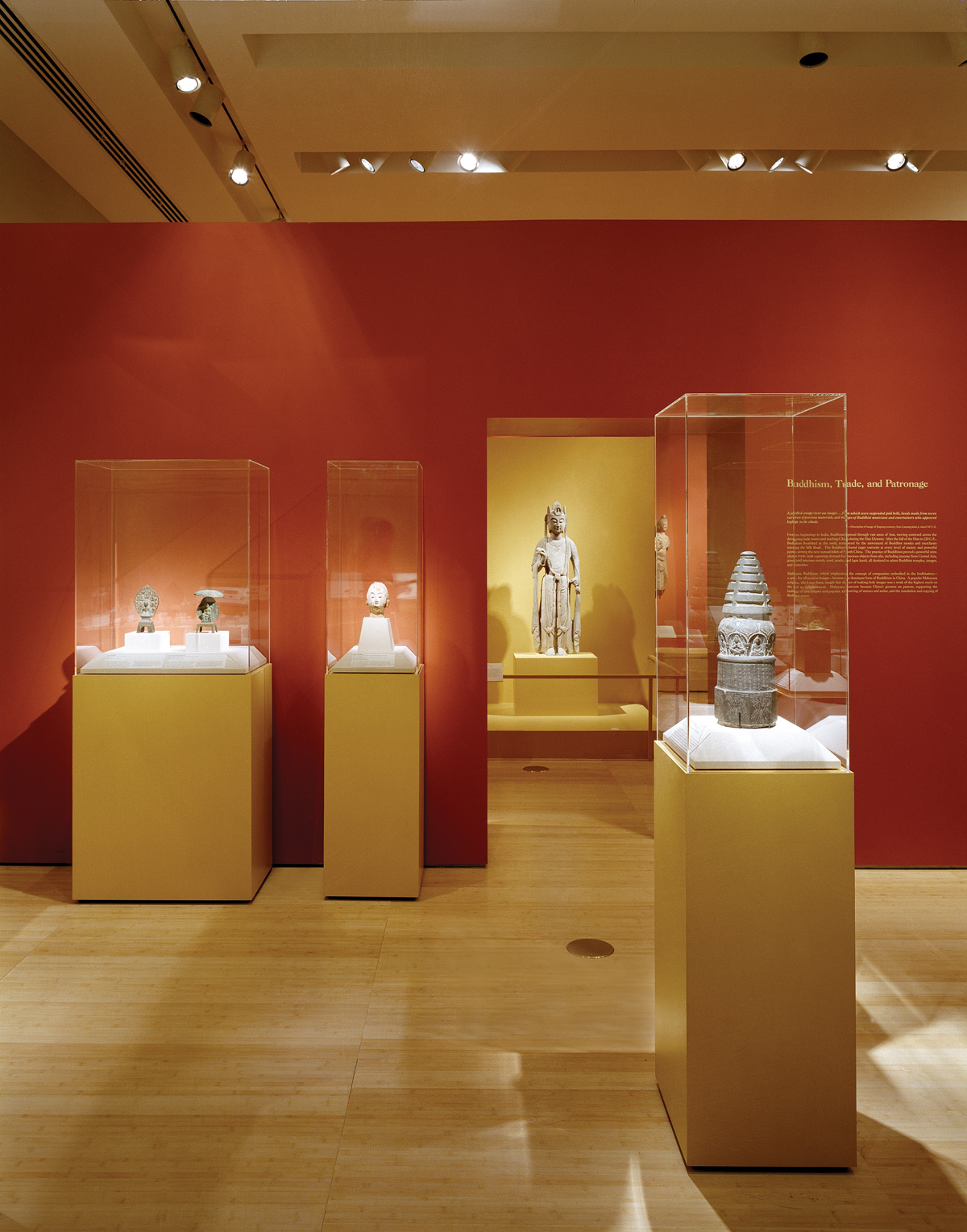
A museum gallery at the Asia Society in Manhattan

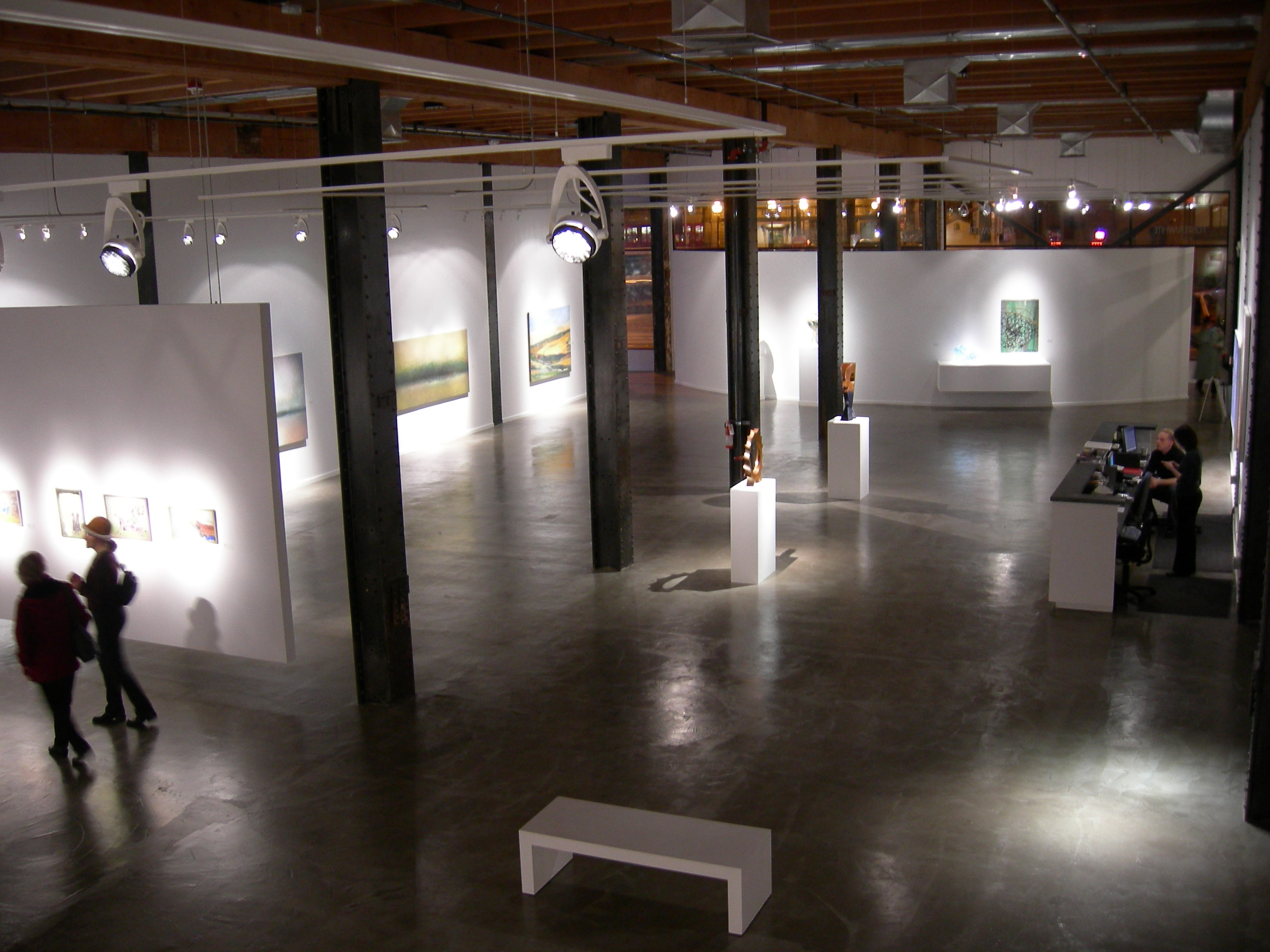
A commercial gallery (Foster/White) in Seattle, Washington

An art gallery is a room or a building in which visual art is displayed. In Western cultures from the mid-15th century, a gallery was any long, narrow covered passage along a wall, first used in the sense of a place for art in the 1590s. The long gallery in Elizabethan and Jacobean houses served many purposes including the display of art. Historically, art is displayed as evidence of status and wealth, and for religious art as objects of ritual or the depiction of narratives. The first galleries were in the palaces of the aristocracy, or in churches. As art collections grew, buildings became dedicated to art, becoming the first art museums.

Among the modern reasons art may be displayed are aesthetic enjoyment, education, historic preservation, or for marketing purposes. The term is used to refer to establishments with distinct social and economic functions, both public and private. Institutions that preserve a permanent collection may be called either "gallery of art" or "museum of art". If the latter, the rooms where art is displayed within the museum building are called galleries. Art galleries that do not maintain a collection are either commercial enterprises for the sale of artworks, or similar spaces operated by art cooperatives or nonprofit organizations. As part of the art world, art galleries play an important role in maintaining the network of connections between artists, collectors, and art experts that define fine art.

== Terminology ==
The terms 'art museum' and 'art gallery' may be used interchangeably as reflected in the names of institutions around the world, some of which are called galleries (e.g. the National Gallery and Neue Nationalgalerie), and some of which are called museums (e.g. the Museum of Modern Art and National Museum of Western Art). However, establishments that display art for other purposes, but serve no museum functions, are only called art galleries.

The distinctive function of a museum is the preservation of artifacts with cultural, historical, and aesthetic value by maintaining a collection of valued objects. Art museums also function as galleries that display works from the museum's own collection or on loan from the collections of other museums. Museums might be in public or private ownership and may be accessible to all or have restrictions on access. Although primarily concerned with visual art, art museums are often used as a venue for other cultural exchanges and artistic activities where the art object is replaced by practices such as performance art, dance, music concerts, or poetry readings.

Similar to a gallery, a kunsthalle is a facility that hosts temporary art exhibitions however does not possess a permanent collection.

== Galleries and the art world ==
The art world comprises everyone involved in the production and distribution of fine art. The market for fine art depends upon maintaining its distinction as high culture, although during recent decades the boundary between high and popular culture has been eroded by postmodernism.

In the case of historical works, or Old Masters this distinction is maintained by the work's provenance; proof of its origin and history.

For more recent work, status is based upon the reputation of the artist. Reputation includes both aesthetic factors; art schools attended, membership in a stylistic or historical movement, the opinions of art historians and critics; and economic factors; inclusion in group and solo exhibitions and past success in the art market. Art dealers, through their galleries, have occupied a central role in the art world by bringing many of these factors together; such as "discovering" new artists, promoting their associations in group shows, and managing market valuation.

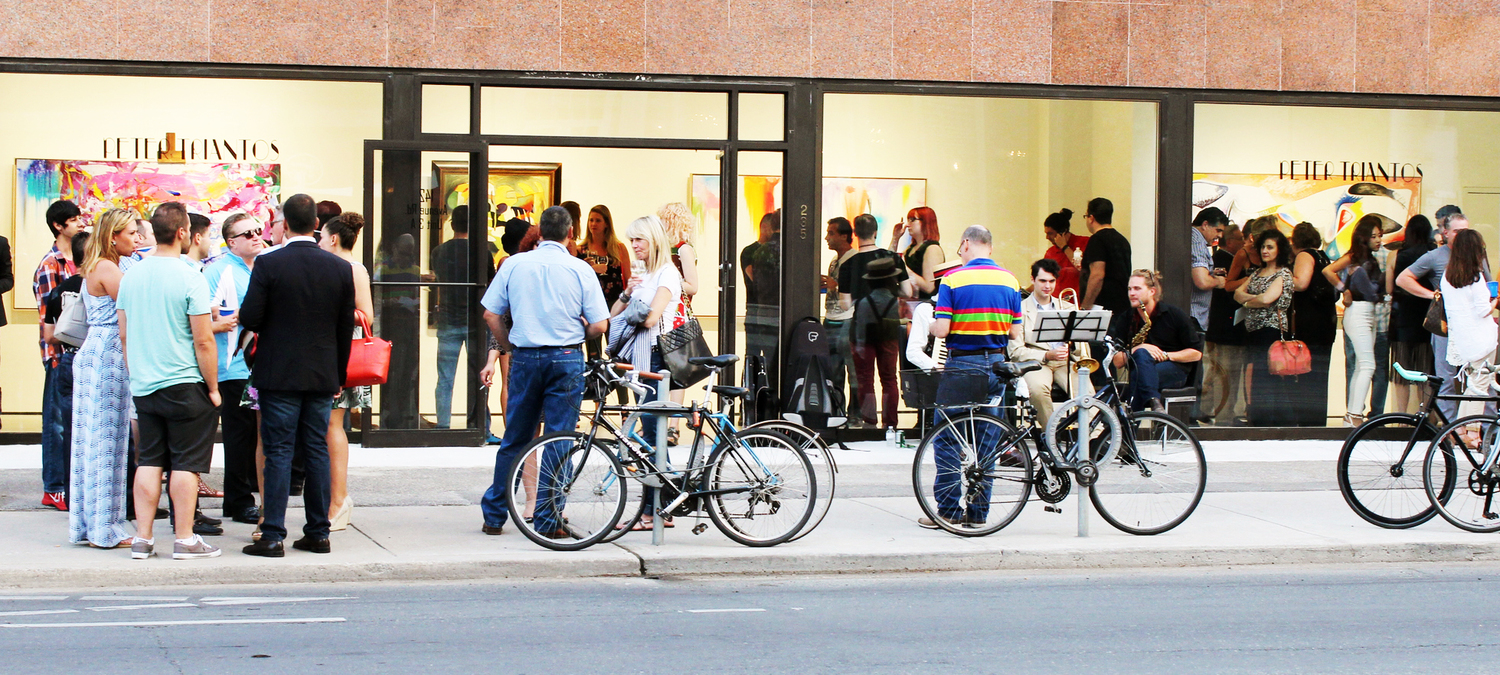
Gallery opening, July 2015

== Commercial galleries ==
Exhibitions of art operating similar to current galleries for marketing art first appeared in the early modern period, approximately 1500 to 1800 CE. In the Middle Ages that preceded, painters and sculptors were members of guilds, seeking commissions to produce artworks for aristocratic patrons or churches. The establishment of academies of art in the 16th century represented efforts by painters and sculptors to raise their status from mere artisans who worked with their hands to that of the classical arts such as poetry and music, which are purely intellectual pursuits. However, the public exhibition of art had to overcome the bias against commercial activity, which was deemed beneath the dignity of artists in many European societies.

Commercial art galleries were well-established by the Victorian era, made possible by the increasing number of people seeking to own objects of cultural and aesthetic value. At the end of the 19th and the beginning of the 20th century there were also the first indications of modern values regarding art; art as an investment versus pure aesthetics, and the increased attention to living artists as an opportunity for such investment.

Commercial galleries owned or operated by an art dealer or "gallerist" occupy the middle tier of the art market, accounting for most transactions, although not those with the highest monetary values. Once limited to major urban art worlds such as New York, Paris and London, art galleries have become global. Another trend in globalization is that while maintaining their urban establishments, galleries also participate in art fairs such as Art Basel and Frieze Art Fair.

Art galleries are the primary connection between artists and collectors. At the high end of the market, a handful of elite auction houses and dealers sell the work of celebrity artists; at the low end artists sell their work from their studio, or in informal venues such as restaurants. Point-of-sale galleries connect artists with buyers by hosting exhibitions and openings. The artworks are on consignment, with the artist and the gallery splitting the proceeds from each sale. Depending upon the expertise of the gallery owner and staff, and the particular market, the artwork shown may be more innovative or more traditional in style and media.

=== Types of galleries ===
Galleries may deal in the primary market of new works by living artists, or the secondary markets for works from prior periods owned by collectors, estates, or museums. The periods represented include Old Masters, Modern (1900–1950), and contemporary (1950–present). Modern and contemporary may be combined in the category of Post-war art; while contemporary may be limited to the 21st century or "emerging artists".

==== Contemporary galleries ====
An enduring model for contemporary galleries was set by Leo Castelli. Rather than simply being the broker for sales, Castelli became actively involved in the discovery and development of new artists, while expecting to remain an exclusive agent for their work. However he also focused exclusively on new works, not participating in the resale of older work by the same artists.

==== Secondary market ====
All art sales after the first are part of the secondary market, in which the artist and the original dealer are not involved. Many of these sales occur privately between collectors, or works are sold at auctions. However some galleries participate in the secondary market depending upon the market conditions. As with any market, the major conditions are supply and demand. Because art is a unique commodity, the artist has a monopoly on production, which ceases when the artist either dies or stops working.

==== Outside the art world ====
Some businesses operate as vanity galleries, charging artists a fee to exhibit their work. Lacking a selection process to assure the quality of the artworks, and having little incentive to promote sales, vanity galleries are avoided as unprofessional.

== Non-profit galleries ==
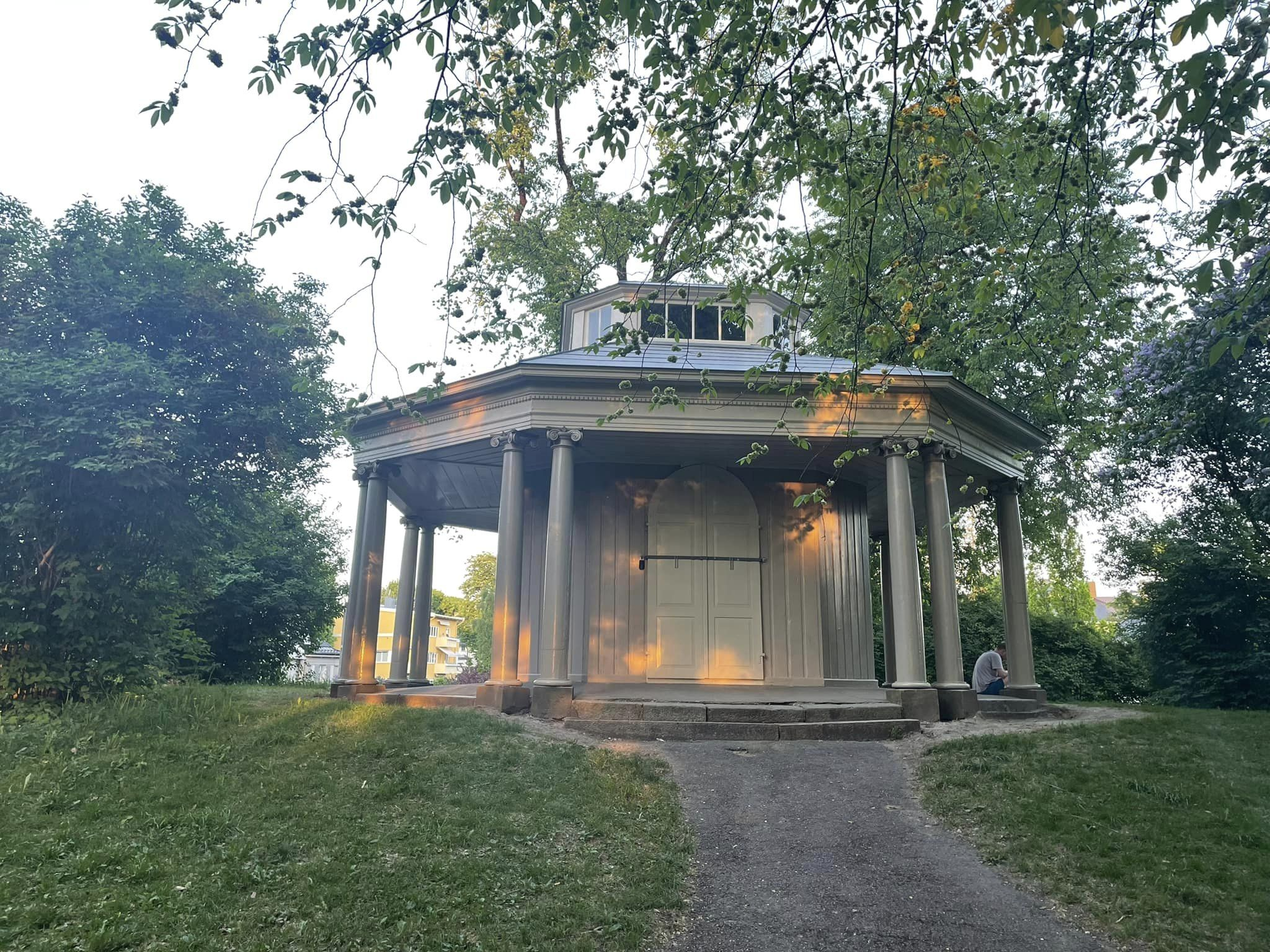
The 1824 Henriette Wegner Pavilion is a small art gallery in Frogner Park, Oslo, close to the Vigeland installation in the same park. Owned by the city, it was opened as an artist-run space in 2012

Some non-profit organizations or local governments host art galleries for cultural enrichment and to support local artists. Non-profit organizations may start as exhibit spaces for artist collectives, and expand into full-fledged arts programs. Other non-profits include the arts as part of other missions, such as providing services to low-income neighborhoods.

- Artists Space was founded in 1972 in SoHo, New York City.
- Westbeth Gallery is operated by the Westbeth Artists Residents Council

== Arts districts ==
Historically, art world activities have benefited from clustering together either in cities or in remote areas offering natural beauty.

The proximity of art galleries facilitated an informal tradition of art show openings on the same night, which have become officially coordinated as "first Friday events" in a number of locations.

Galleries selling the work of recognized artists may occupy space in established commercial areas of a city. New styles in art have historically been attracted to the low rent of marginal neighborhoods. An artist colony existed in Greenwich Village as early as 1850, and the tenements built around Washington Square Park to house immigrants after the Civil War also attracted young artists and avant-garde art galleries. The resulting gentrification prompted artists and galleries to move to the adjacent neighborhood "south of Houston" (SoHo) which became gentrified in turn.

Attempting to recreate this natural process, arts districts have been created intentionally by local governments in partnership with private developers as a strategy for revitalizing neighborhoods. Such developments often include spaces for artists to live and work as well as galleries.

== Temporary galleries ==
A contemporary practice has been the use of vacant commercial space for art exhibitions that run for periods from a single day to a month. Now called "popup galleries", a precursor was Artomatic which had its first event in 1999 and has occurred periodically to the present, mainly in the Washington metro area.

== See also ==
- List of national galleries
