= The Sundial (Vigeland) =

Coordinates: 59°55′41.05″N 10°41′51.83″E

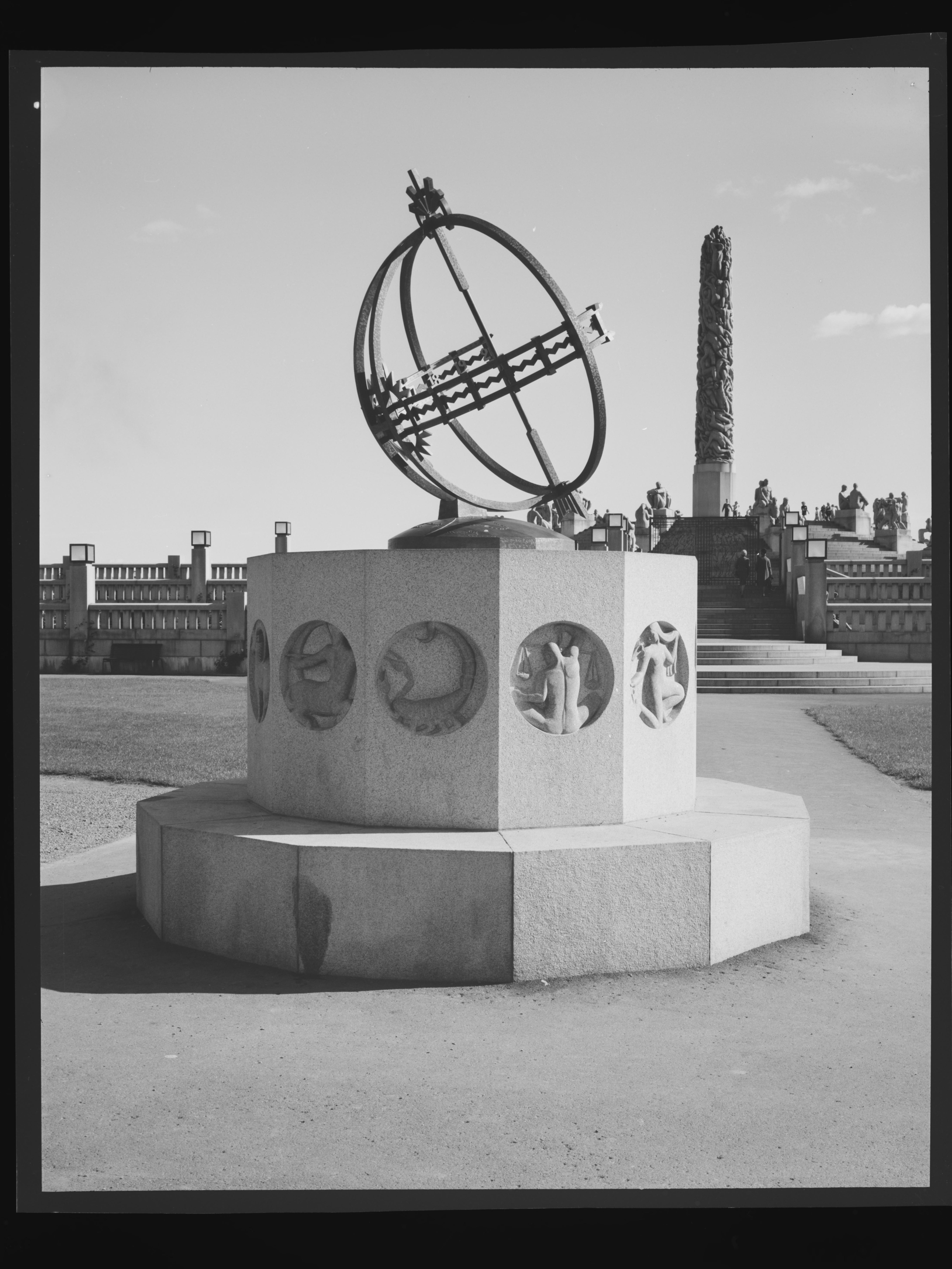
(before 1963)

The Sundial (Norwegian: Soluret) is a sculpture that is part of the Vigeland installation in Frogner Park in Oslo, created by Gustav Vigeland. It is a sundial that stands on a pedestal with granite reliefs between the Monolith and the Wheel of Life. The sundial dates back to around 1930. It is one of two sundials in Frogner Park, alongside Benjamin Wegner's sundial in front of Frogner Manor.

The Sundial was vandalized in 2003.
