= Lincoln Monument (Norway) =

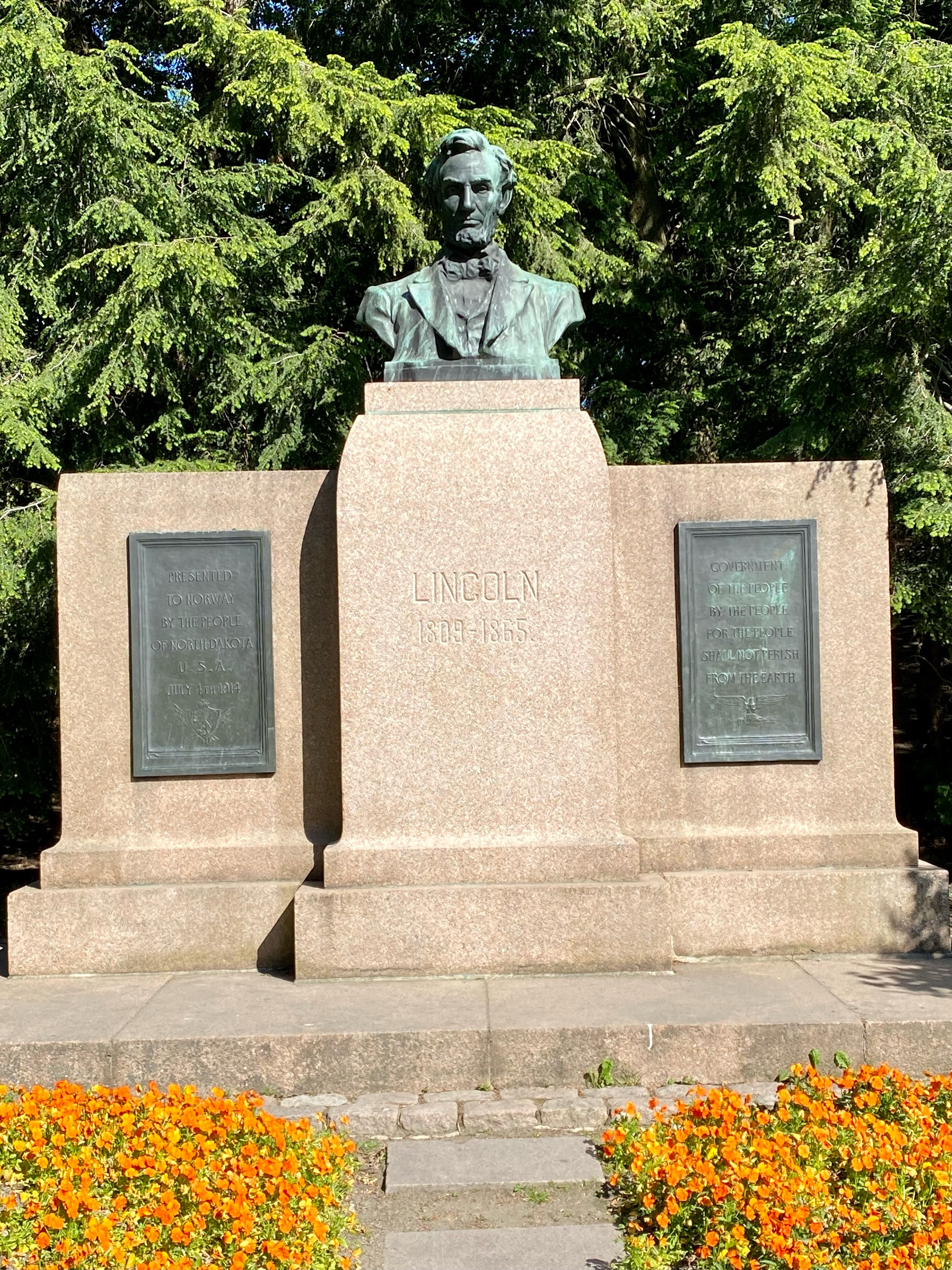

Coordinates: 59°55'25.6"N 10°42'17.9"E

The Lincoln Monument (Lincolnmonumentet) in the Frogner Park of Oslo, Norway, was sculpted by Norwegian-American Paul Fjelde. The monument was gifted to Norway by the U.S. State of North Dakota on July 4, 1914. It is located close to Henriette Wegner Pavilion, in the romantic landscape park built in the 19th century. A bronze plaque is inscribed with a passage from the Gettysburg Address: "Government of the people, by the people, for the people, shall not perish from the earth." The plaque on the left bears this inscription: "Presented to Norway by the people of North Dakota, U.S.A. July 4th, 1914."

The 500-pound bronze bust was unveiled in Oslo on July 4, 1914, with several dignitaries present. Speeches were held by North Dakota Governor Louis B. Hanna, Carl Berner, and Jørgen Løvland.

It was moved from Gamleparken to its current location in the park in 1999. It is now located immediately east of the Oslo Museum (Frogner Manor).

On the Fourth of July, it is a popular gathering place for Americans in Norway.

== Background ==
In 1912, Norway presented a statue of Rollo, a 10th-century Viking chieftain, to the U.S. State of North Dakota. On July 12, a dedication celebration was held in Fargo when it was placed next to the Great Northern Railroad Depot. The statue was later relocated to its current location at the Elim Lutheran Church in the Downtown Fargo District. L. B. Hanna was elected North Dakota Governor later that year, and he was looking for a way to reciprocate this gift. The North Dakota Legislature authorized $10,000 in 1913 for a presentation at Norway's Centennial Constitution Day Celebration to be held in 1914. Governor Hanna appointed a five-member committee to find a suitable gift for Norway's Centennial Constitution Day Celebration. On the committee were Dr. Herman O. Fjelde, Paul Fjelde's uncle, and Mary Deem.

The committee agreed that the gift would be a bust of Abraham Lincoln, and a competition was opened to competitive bids. Fjelde's work was judged the best. When Fjelde's model was completed, the full committee traveled to Chicago to view Fjelde's work. Led by Governor Hanna, a delegation from North Dakota traveled to Norway with Fjelde's 500-pound bronze bust. On July 4, 1914, it was erected in Oslo's Frogner Park, where it was unveiled and presented to dignitaries. A replica has since been created at the courthouse lawn in Hillsboro, North Dakota.

== See also ==
- List of statues of Abraham Lincoln
- Norway–United States relations
- 1914 Jubilee Exhibition
