= The Angry Boy =

Sculpture by Gustav Vigeland

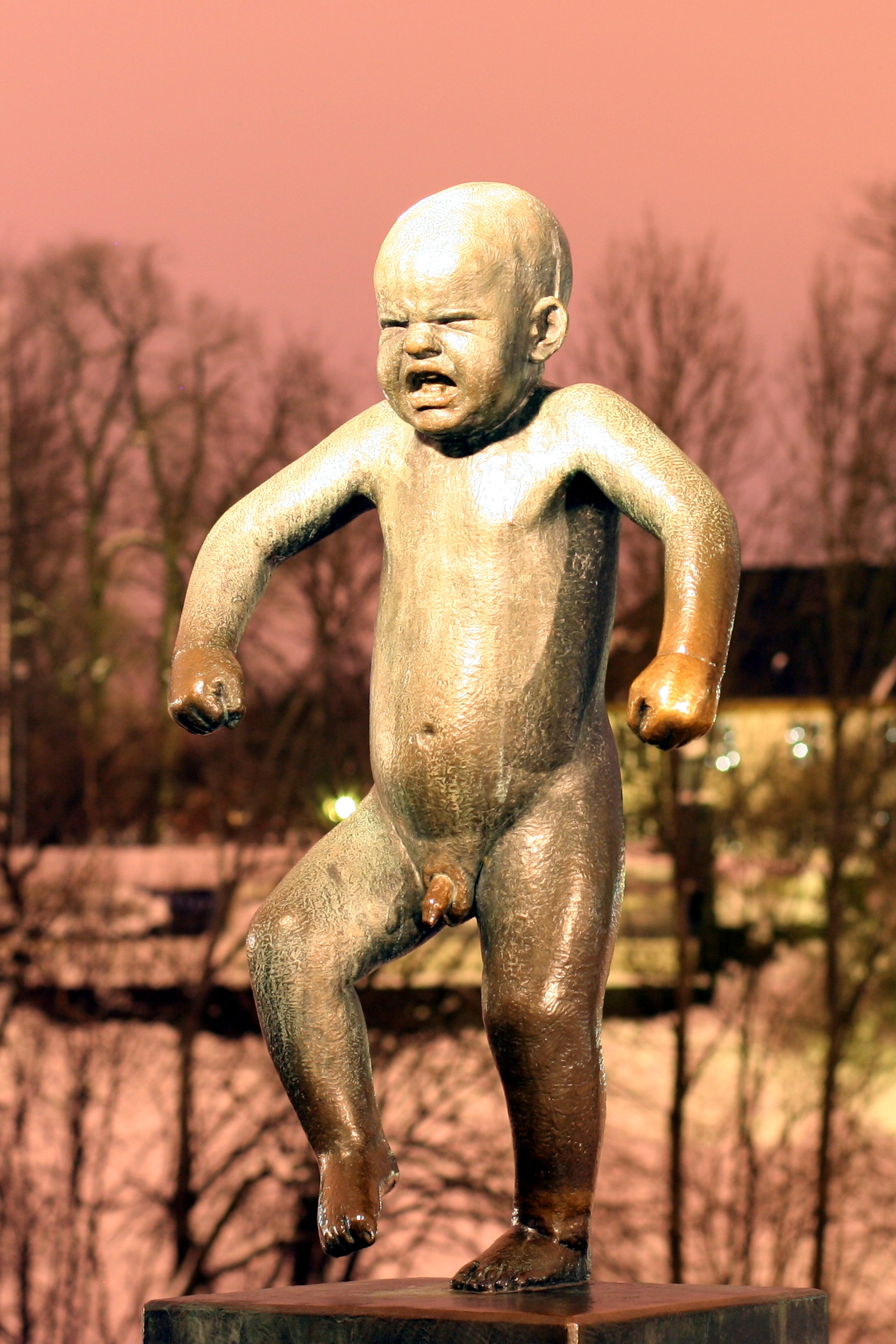
The Angry Boy

The Angry Boy (Norwegian: Sinnataggen) is a sculpture in the Vigeland installation in Frogner Park, Oslo. It depicts a small, angry boy and is considered Gustav Vigeland's most famous sculpture. The sculpture, cast in bronze, was likely modeled in 1928 and installed as one of 58 sculptures on the "Bridge" in the sculpture park in 1940.

== Description ==
"The Angry Boy" shows a naked, chubby little boy clenching his fists, raising his shoulders and right leg, and screaming in anger while standing on one foot. It is one of four child figures, two boys and two girls, placed in the central section of the Bridge. The statues of children, women, and men on the bridge stand on the railing. "The Angry Boy" is positioned on the corner of the central section facing south. It is about one meter high, including a square base plate measuring 30 x 30 cm. The bridge sculptures were modeled by Vigeland between 1926 and 1933.

Vigeland is said to have drawn the first sketch for "The Angry Boy" as early as 1901. In 1911, he modeled a smaller version of the same motif, making at least four castings. His son inherited this sculpture and made at least ten additional, unauthorized "junior casts" of the same figure.

Initially referred to as "Screaming Boy" (skrikende gutt), the sculpture got the nickname "The Angry Boy" (Sinnataggen) in the 1940s. Vigeland rarely titled his works, allowing for freer interpretation. Over time, Sinnataggen became a popular postcard motif among tourists and a sort of mascot for the city of Oslo, similar to the iconic sculptures The Little Mermaid in Copenhagen and Manneken Pis in Brussels.
