= Benjamin Wegner's sundial =

Coordinates: 59°55′24.60″N 10°42′8.48″E

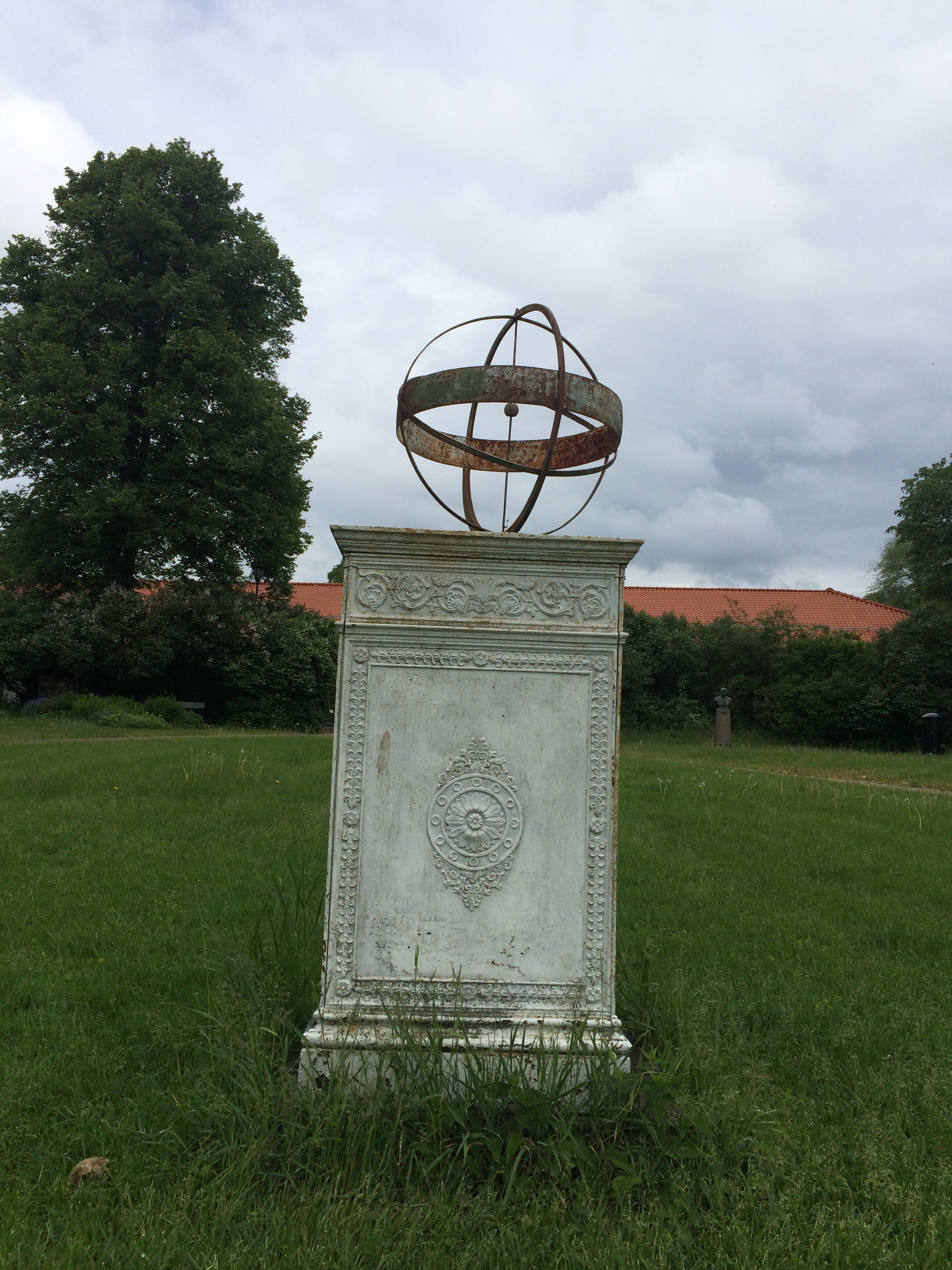
Benjamin Wegner's sundial from ca. 1837 in Frogner Park

Benjamin Wegner's sundial (Norwegian: Benjamin Wegners solur) is a sundial from around 1837 located in Frogner Park, Oslo, right in front of the Frogner Manor buildings, which today house Oslo City Museum. It was built for mining magnate Benjamin Wegner, a co-owner and the director-general of Blaafarveværket—Norway's largest mining company—after he took over Frogner Manor in 1836. Wegner had a grand oval driveway built in front of the main building with a sundial in the middle of the lawn. The sundial is constructed as an open globe, where the meridians cast a shadow on sunny days onto the inner part of the globe, hitting the inside of the equator line and thus showing the time, specifically the astronomical solar time. Odd Gunnar Skagestad wrote in 2020 that the nearly 200-year-old sundial is greatly neglected and called for efforts to preserve it. It is one of two sundials in Frogner Park, alongside Gustav Vigeland's sundial from ca. 1930. The nearby Henriette Wegner Pavilion commemorates his wife and their 1824 wedding in her native Hamburg.
