= Hans Jacob Scheel =

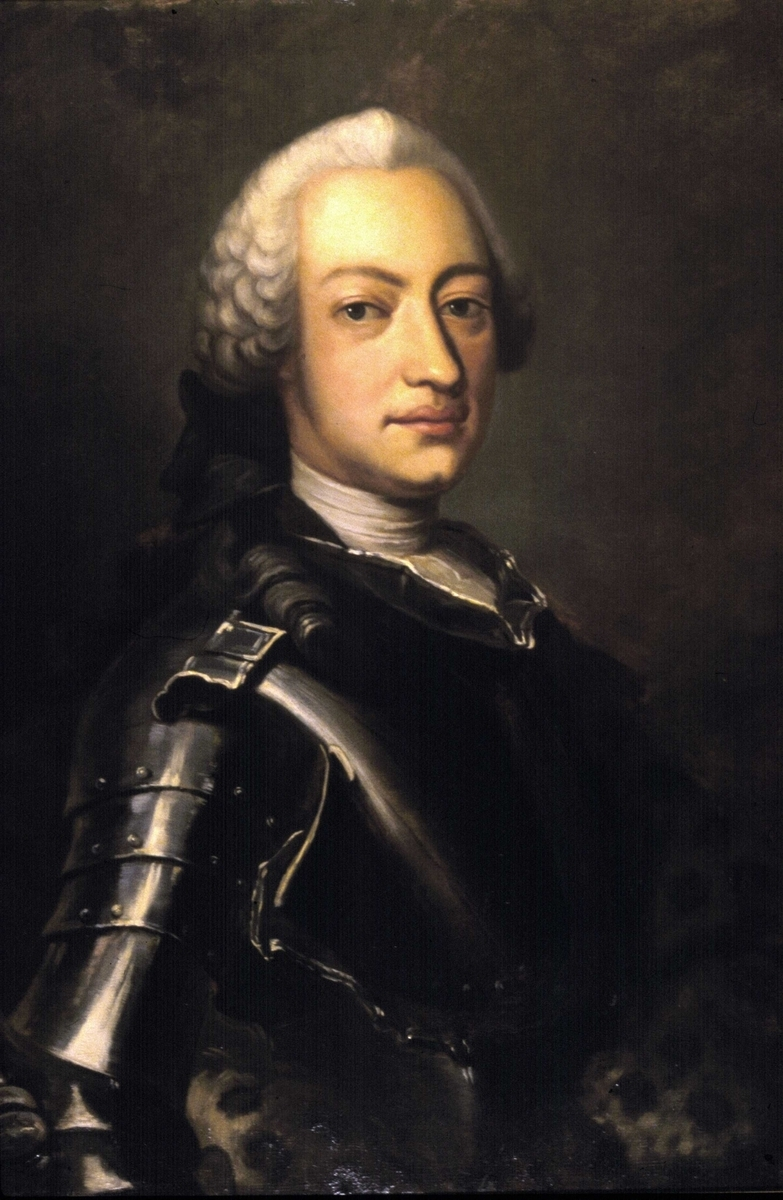
Hans Jacob Scheel

Hans Jacob Scheel (23 August 1714, died 21 January 1774) was a Dano-Norwegian Major-General.

Scheel was born in Copenhagen, Denmark-Norway. He was the son of Hans Heinrich Scheel (1668-1738) and Benedicte Dorothea Gjordsdatter (1684-1752). He served as Chamberlain at the Danish Royal Court. In 1752 he became a lieutenant colonel and Commandant of Fredrikstad Fortress from 1766 to 1774. Scheel was the first owner to make Frogner Manor (Frogner hovedgård) his permanent residence. He had purchased the estate in 1747. However, construction costs at Frogner exceeded his financial ability and he was forced him to sell the manor in 1760. He was married to Catharine Christine von Brüggemann (1725-1800) and was the father of Frederik Otto Scheel (1748–1803). He died at Fredrikstad in Østfold, Norway.

== Literature ==
- Danmarks Adels Aarbog, 1893.
- Oslo Militære samfunds portrettgalleri
- Dehli, Martin: Fredrikstad bys historie.
- Ovenstad, Olai: Militærbiografier, Den norske hærs officerer fra 1628 til 1814, Oslo 1948.
- Scheel, Christian Fredrik: Slekten Scheel i Danmark og Norge mv. Oslo 2005, s. 9.2.-9.8.
- Widerberg, C. S: Fredrikstad, Gamlebyen og festningen, Oslo 1934.
