= Frogner Park =

Park in Oslo, Norway

Coordinates: 59°55′36″N 10°42′5″E

- Part of Frogner Park
- Interactive map of Frogner Park
- Location: Frogner Manor, Frogner, Oslo
- Nearest city: Oslo
- Area: 0.45 square kilometres (110 acres)
- Established: c. 1750 as a baroque garden of Frogner Manor; Early 20th century as a large public park

Frogner Park (Norwegian: Frognerparken) is a public park in the central West End borough of Frogner in Oslo, Norway. The park is historically part of Frogner Manor and is Oslo's largest park, open to the public at all times. It includes the manor house which is the seat of Oslo Museum, the nearby Henriette Wegner Pavilion, the Vigeland installation of sculptures (Norwegian: Vigelandsanlegget) created by sculptor Gustav Vigeland, Frogner Baths, Frogner stadion, Frognerparken Café, the restaurant Herregårdskroen and the largest collection of roses in the country with 14,000 plants of 150 species. Frogner Park is the most visited tourist attraction in Norway.

Frogner Manor was historically one of the largest estates in the modern Oslo area. Both the park, the entire borough of Frogner as well as Frognerseteren derive their names from Frogner Manor. The manor house is located in the south of the park, and houses Oslo Museum, which opened there in 1909. The nearby Henriette Wegner Pavilion commemorates the philanthropist and women's rights pioneer Henriette Wegner and was moved from Blaafarveværket in 1837. Frogner Park was gradually opened as a public park from 1904 and the 1914 Jubilee Exhibition was held there. From 1924, Gustav Vigeland's sculpture installation was built in parts of Frogner Park. It consists of sculptures as well as larger structures such as bridges and fountains. The installation is not a separate park, but the name of the sculptures within the larger Frogner Park. The Vigeland installation is sometimes called "Vigeland Park" or "Vigeland Sculpture Park." The director of Oslo Museum Lars Roede said "Vigeland Park" "doesn't really exist" and is "the name of the tourists," as opposed to "Oslo natives' more down-to-earth name, Frogner Park." However, the name Vigeland Park (Vigelandsparken) is used by the Vigeland Museum on its website and printed materials to refer to the Vigeland installation in both Norwegian and English.

The park of Frogner Manor was historically smaller and centered on the manor house, and was landscaped as a baroque park in the 18th century by its owner, the later general Hans Jacob Scheel. Wegner Park, a romantic landscape park, was built around 1840 by then-owners, industrialist Benjamin Wegner and Henriette Wegner. Wegner's romantic park still exists in the areas near the manor house. Large parts of the estate were sold to give room for city expansion in the 19th century, and the remaining estate was bought by Christiania municipality in 1896 and made into a public park.

Frogner Park is the largest park in the city and covers 45 hectares; the sculpture installation is the world's largest sculpture park made by a single artist. Frogner Park is the most popular tourist attraction in Norway, with between 1 and 2 million visitors each year, and is open to the public at all times. Frogner Park and the Vigeland installation (Norwegian: Frognerparken og Vigelandsanlegget) was protected under the Heritage Act on 13 February 2009 as the first park in Norway.

== History ==
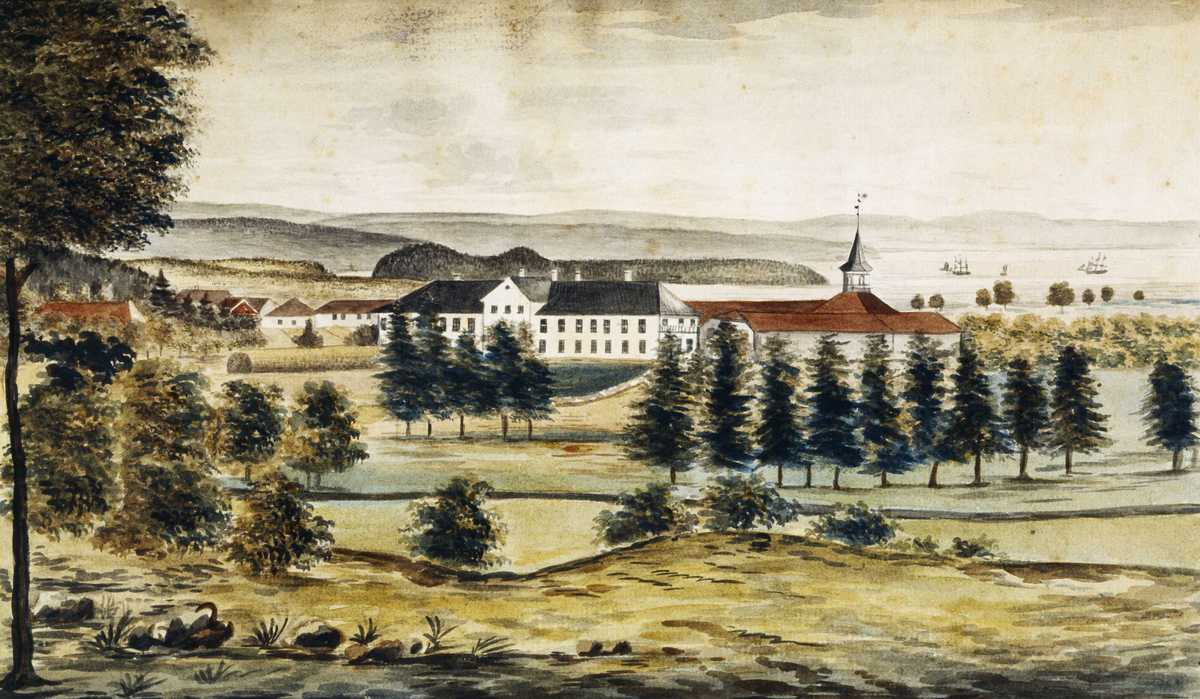
Frogner Manor and Frogner Park painted in 1815

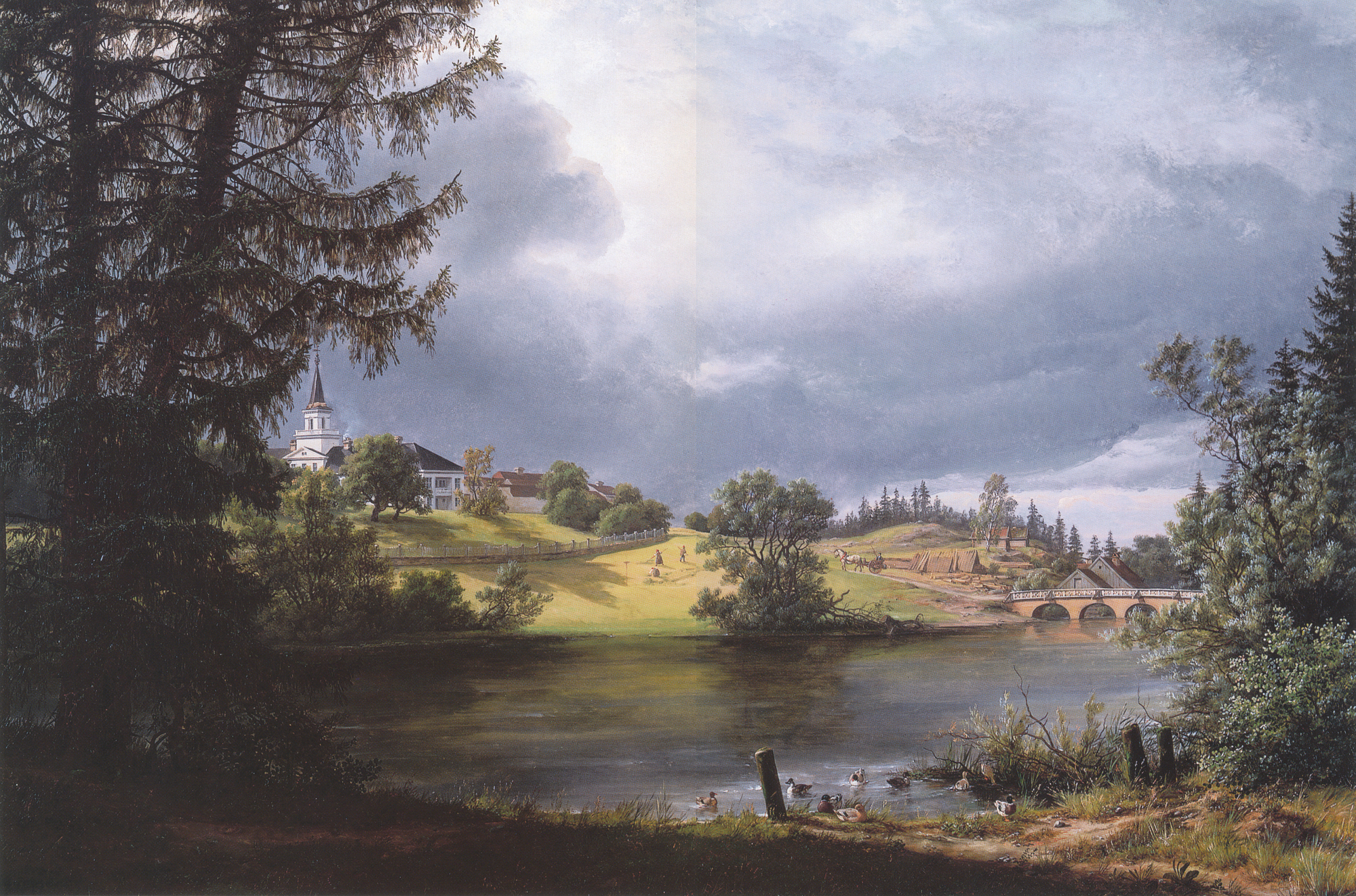
Frogner Manor and Frogner Park painted in 1842 by I.C. Dahl.

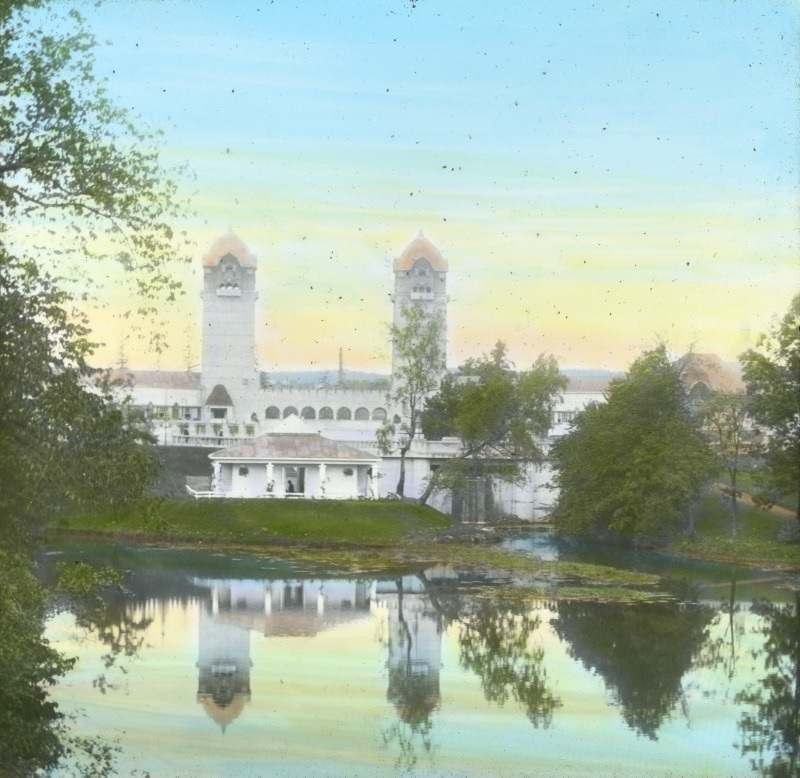
The 1914 Jubilee Exhibition seen from the Frogner Pond

In the middle of the 18th century Hans Jacob Scheel, then owner of the Frogner Manor, laid out a Baroque garden adjacent to his new manor house. It was expanded by the people who followed him, starting with Bernt Anker (1746–1805) who bought Frogner in 1790 and expanded the main building. Benjamin Wegner bought the manor in 1836 and he transformed the garden into a romantic park around 1840. Later, most of the arable land was sold to private developers.

Around one square kilometer remained when the City of Oslo bought the property in 1896 to secure space for further urban development. The municipal government decided around 1900 to make a park for recreation and sports. Frogner Stadium was opened near the road and the area near the buildings was opened to the public in 1904. Norwegian architect Henrik Bull designed the grounds and some of the buildings erected in Frogner Park for the 1914 Jubilee Exhibition.

The municipal government subsequently decided that Gustav Vigeland's fountain and all his monuments and statues should be placed in the park. The area was ready for Gustav Vigeland fountain in 1924 and the final plan was released in 1932 by the city-council. Most of the statues depict people engaging in various typically human pursuits, such as running, wrestling, dancing, hugging, holding hands and so on. However, Vigeland occasionally included some statues that are more abstract, including one statue, which shows an adult male, fighting off a horde of babies.

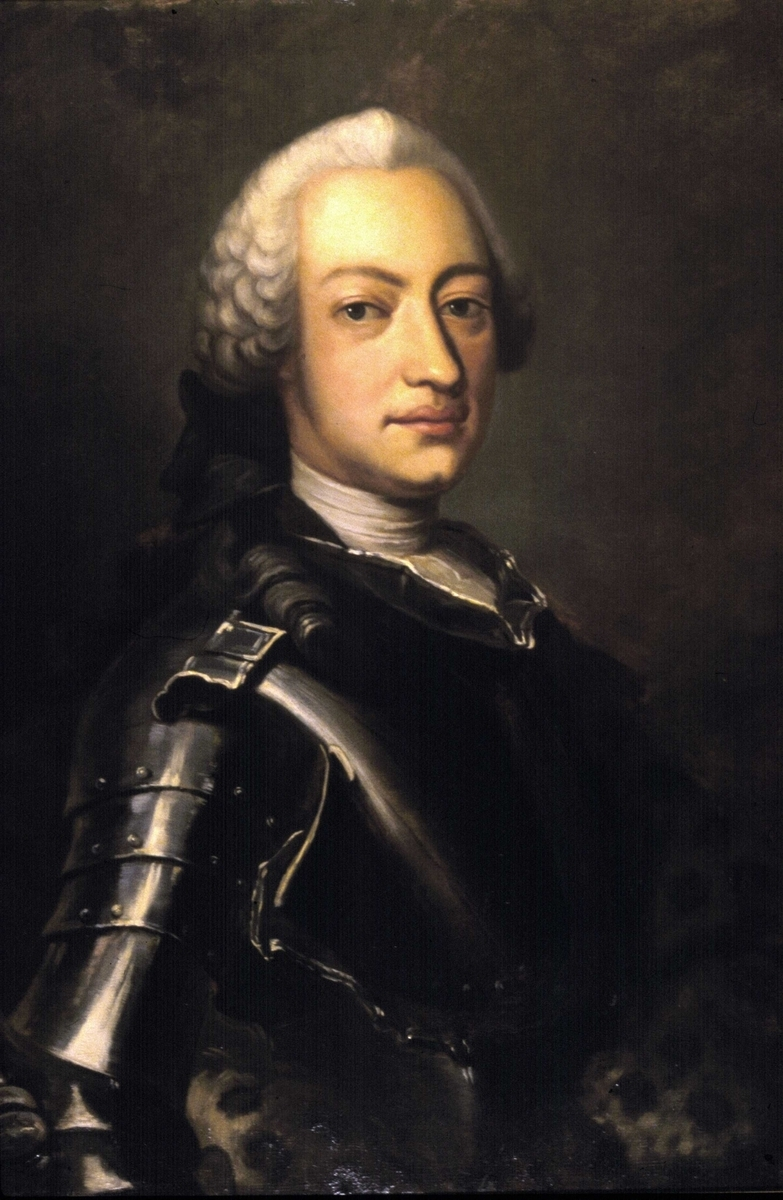
Would-be General and Chamberlain Hans Jacob Scheel (owner of Frogner from 1747) laid out a baroque garden around 1750

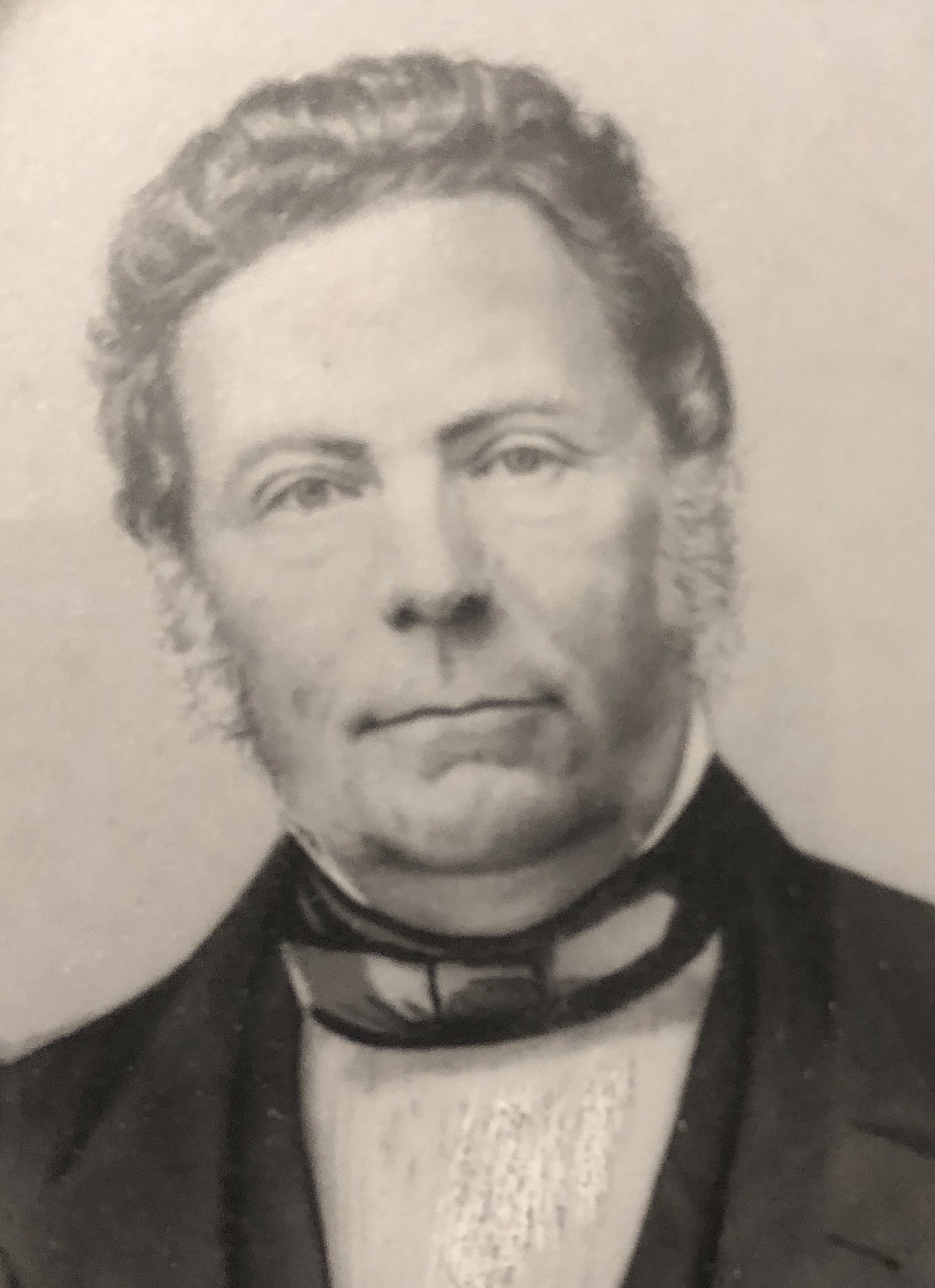
Industrialist Benjamin Wegner (owner of Frogner from 1836) transformed the garden into a romantic park around 1840

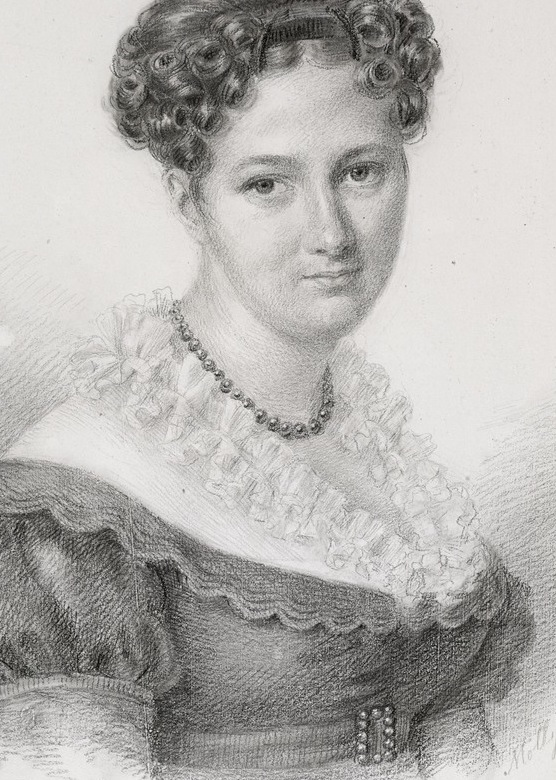
Philanthropist Henriette Wegner

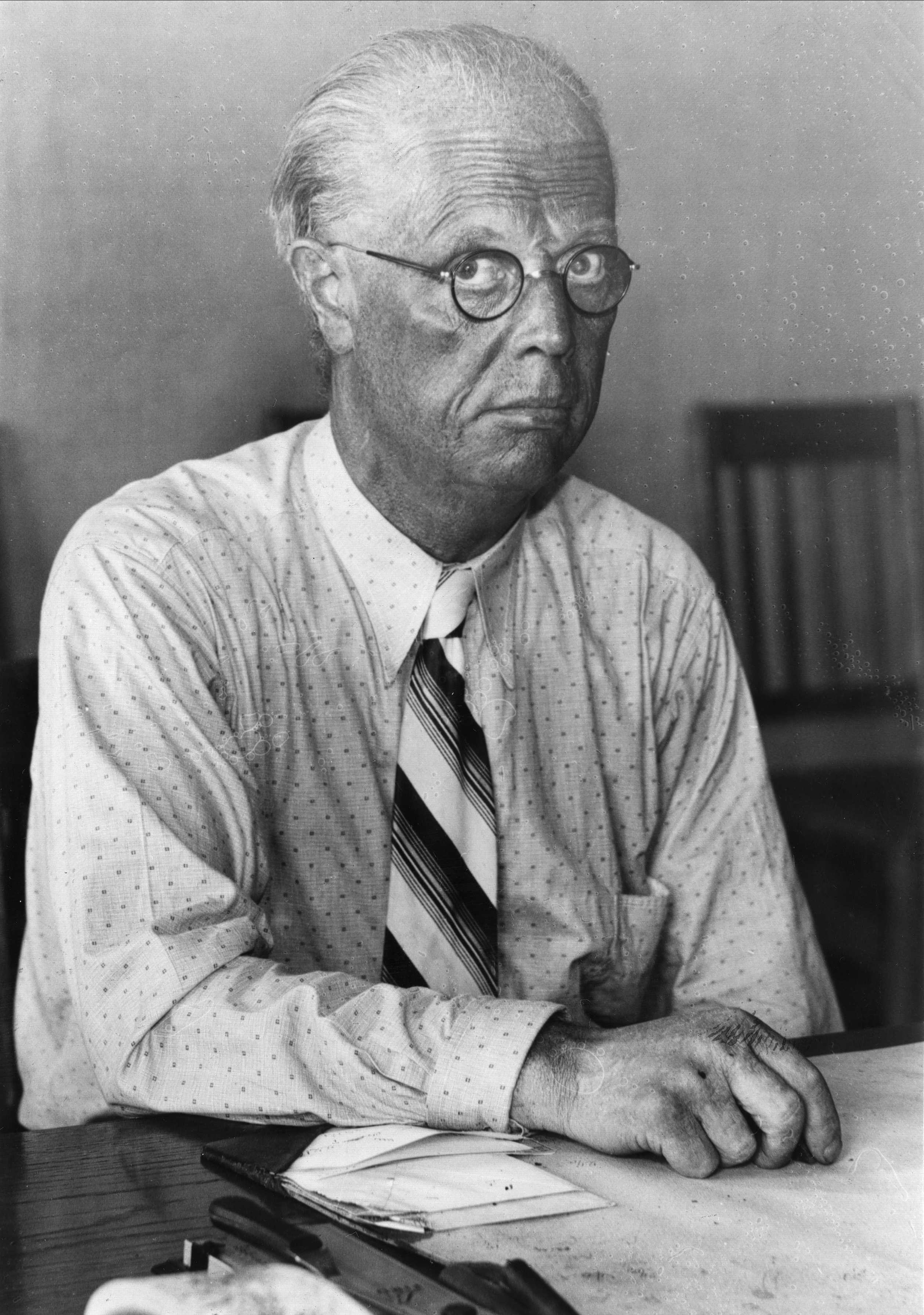
Landscape architect and city gardener Marius Røhne was a central person in the development of the park from the early 1900s

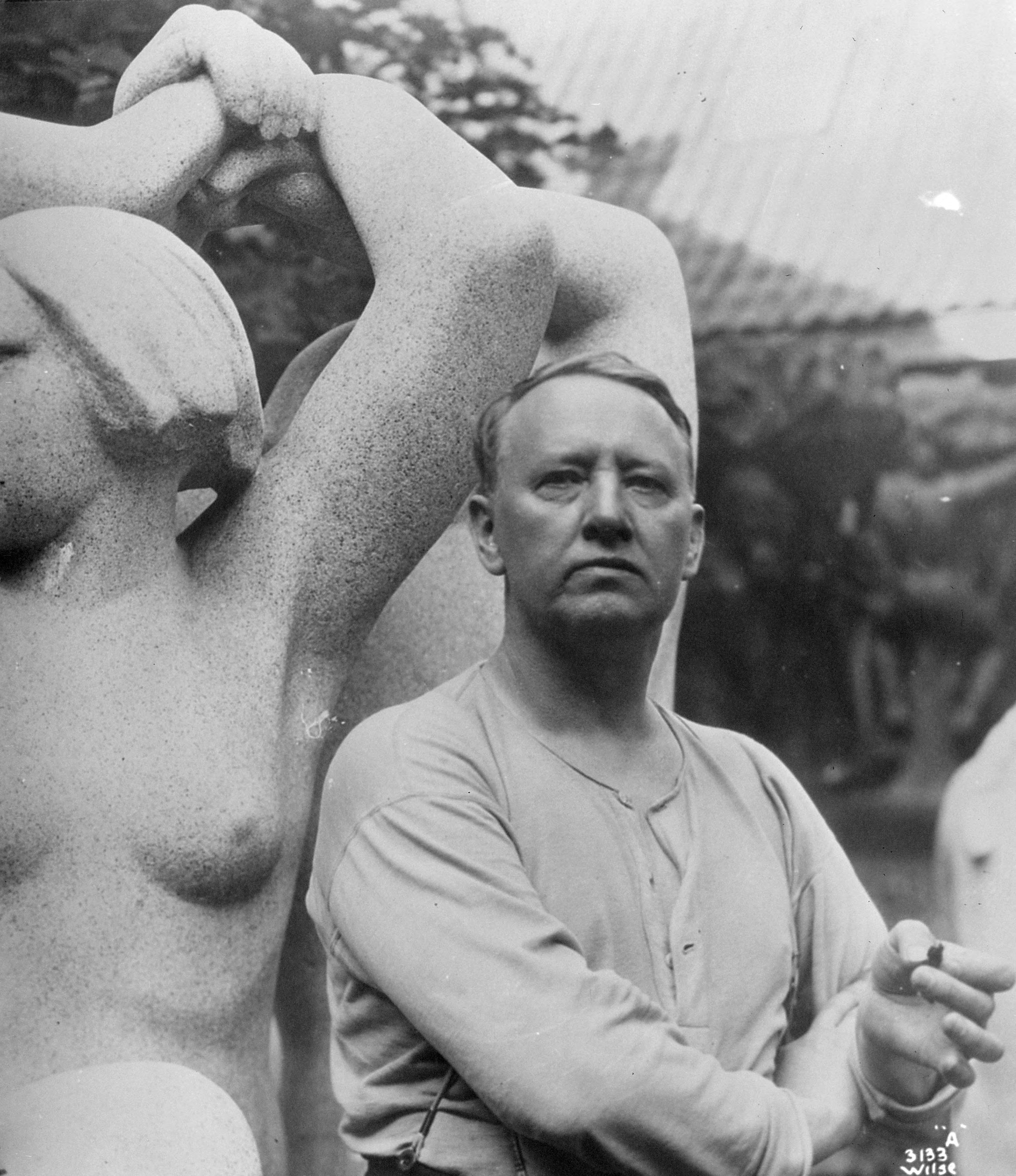
Sculptor Gustav Vigeland created the sculpture arrangement in the centre of the present enlarged park from the 1920s until his death in 1943

== Henriette Wegner Pavilion ==
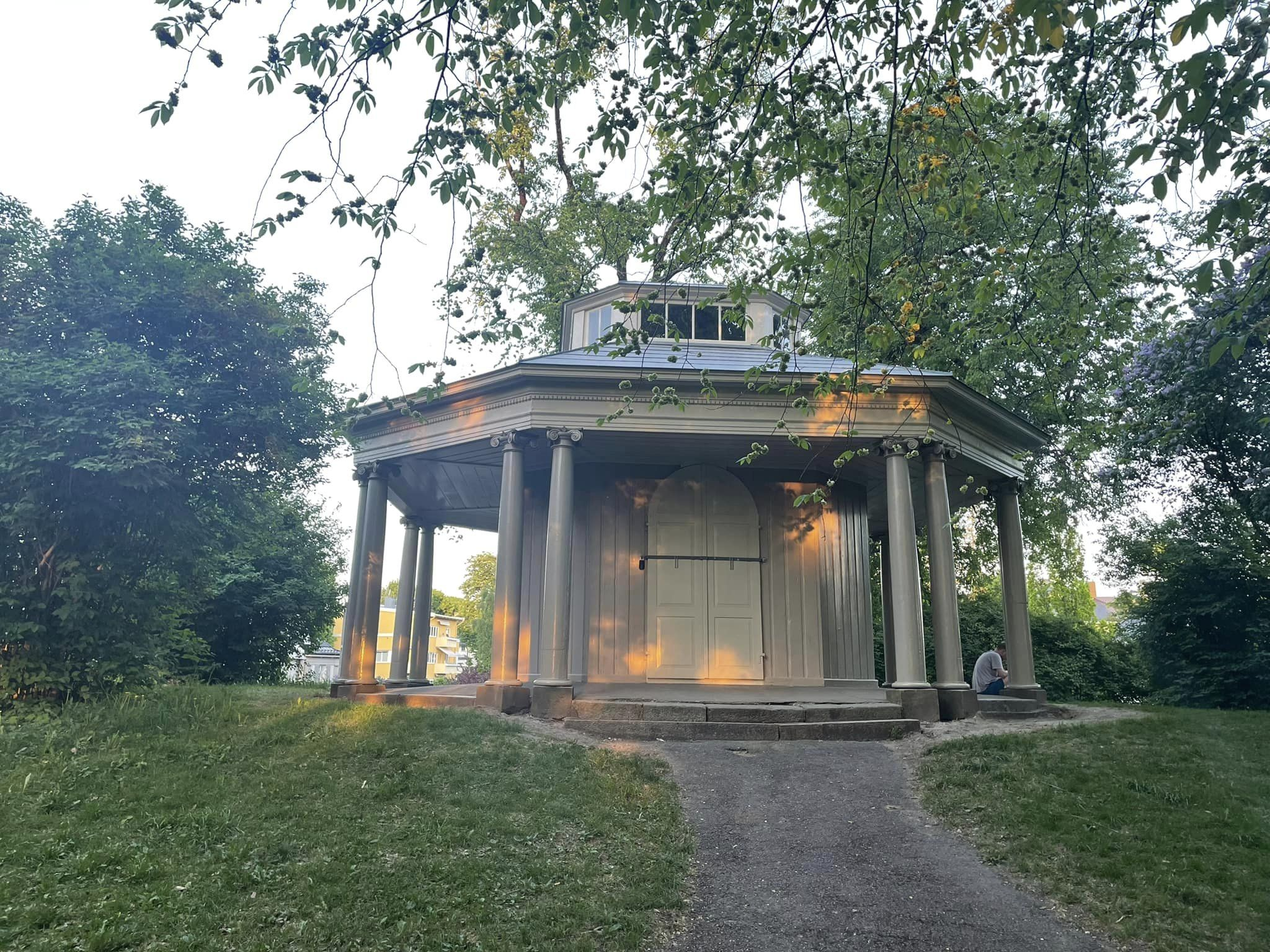
The classical Henriette Wegner Pavilion from 1824

The Henriette Wegner Pavilion was built in 1824 at Blaafarveværket as a wedding gift to Henriette Wegner from Benjamin Wegner, the director and co-owner of Blaafarveværket. It was moved to Frogner Park in 1837 after the Wegner family acquired Frogner Manor. It is located within the section of Frogner Park known as Wegner Park, the romantic landscape park built for the Wegners around 1840.

The pavilion is a tea pavilion shaped like a classical octagonal round temple with a colonnade, inspired by structures from Greco-Roman antiquity but made with Norwegian materials.

The ceiling is a painted replica in miniature of the dome of the Pantheon, Rome, that makes the room appear larger. The pavilion underwent a restoration from 2023 and reopens in 2024, its 200th anniversary.

== Manor house ==
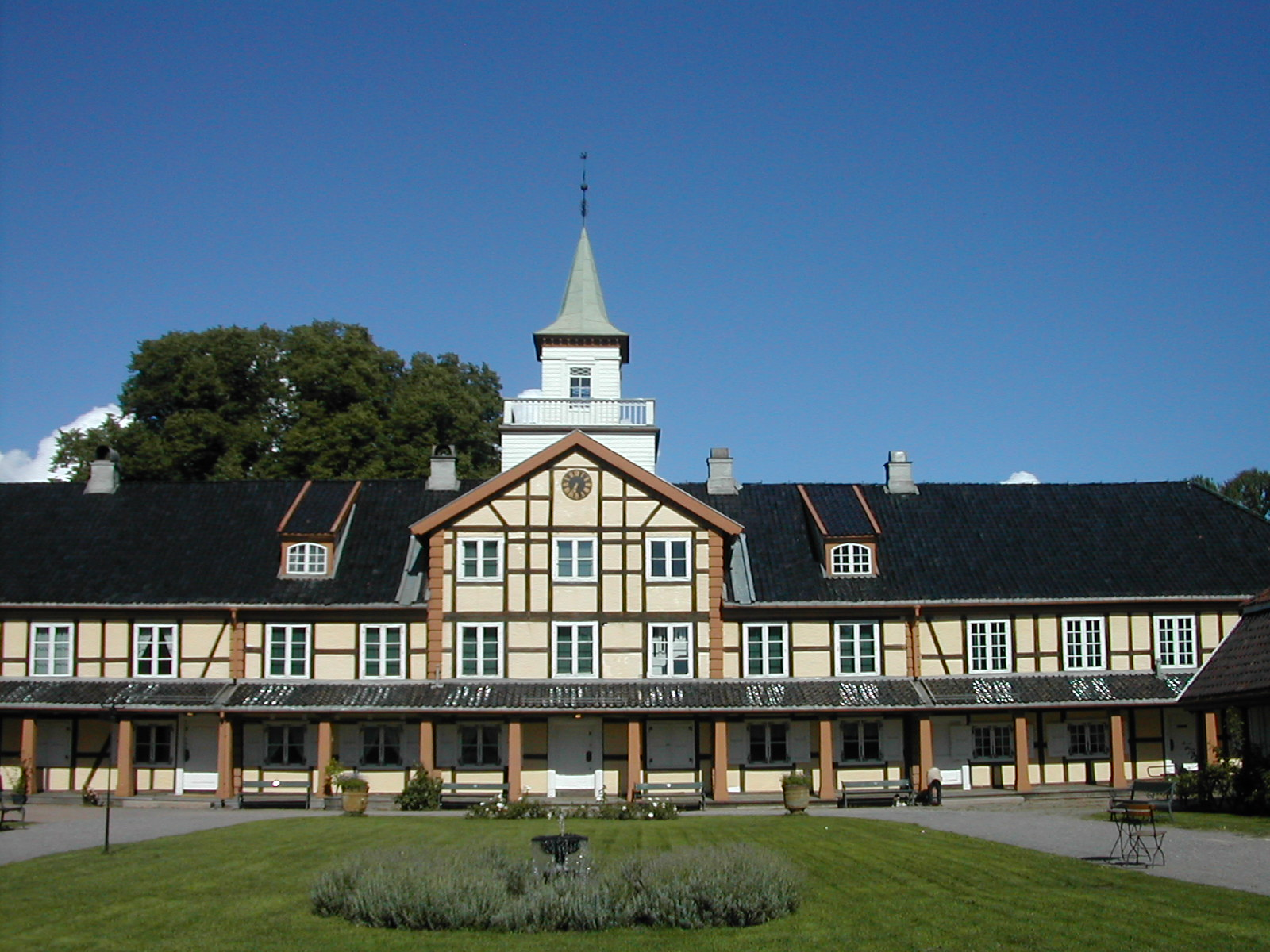
Frogner Manor, located in the south of Frogner Park

The manor buildings are located in the southern part of the park. The buildings in Danish country house style were built in the 1750s when Hans Jacob Scheel took over the property. After Bernt Anker, who was Norway's richest man, took over the estate in 1790, the buildings were further extended, and the manor house became one of the most important meeting places of Norwegian high society. They were rebuilt again by the industrialist Benjamin Wegner, who became owner in 1836 and who moved the tower to the main building.

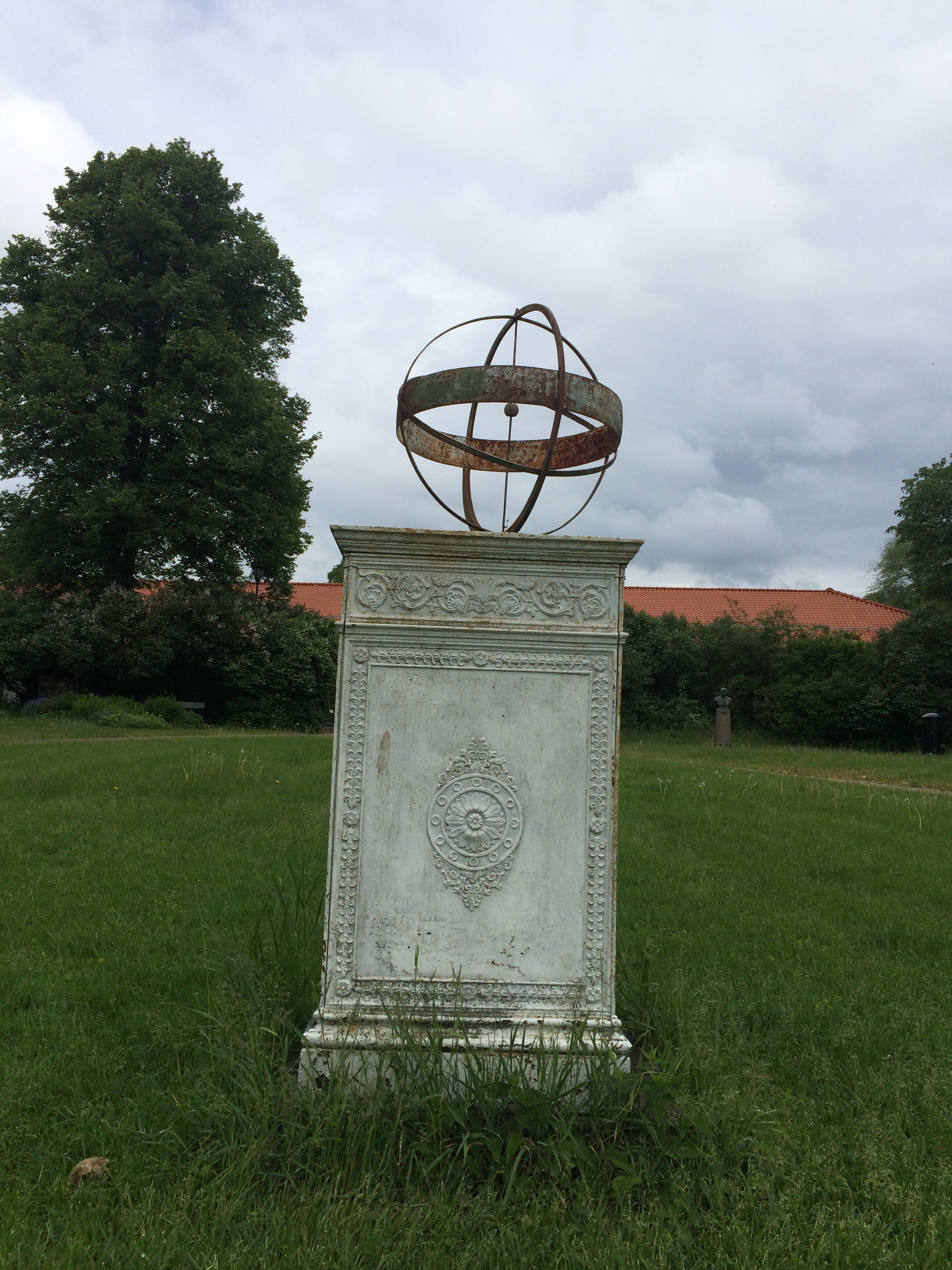
Benjamin Wegner's sundial from ca. 1837

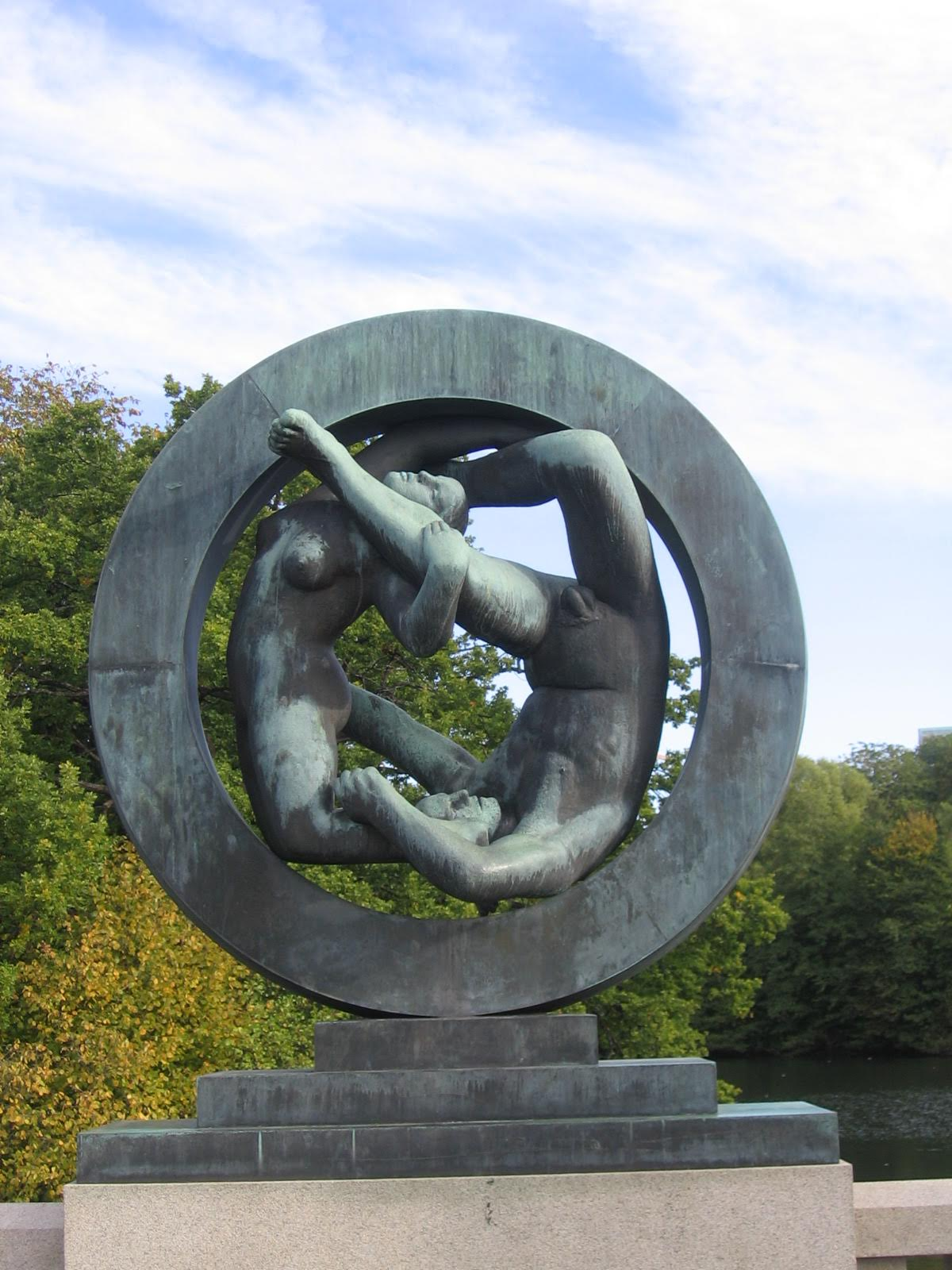
Circle

Under Wegner, some surrounding buildings were also built, the Henriette Wegner Pavilion on the nearby hill "Utsikten" (The View) and the coachman house at the main gate in front of the manor house. In front of the main buildings is also a sundial built for Wegner.

Today, the manor buildings are occupied by Oslo City Museum.

Outside the manor buildings, there is also a café opened in 1918, Frogner Park Café, and a restaurant opened in 1960, Herregårdskroen (Frogner Manor Restaurant).

== Flora and gardens ==
Frogner Park contains a large rose garden, the Frogner Rose Garden, with 14,000 roses spread across 150 different species. The roses in Frogner Park are maintained according to biological principles.

Today, there are approximately 3,000 trees in Frogner Park. Some of them are more than 250 years old, with trunk circumferences of up to 5.5 meters. Among the park's trees, there are many exotic varieties, such as magnolia, sequoia, ginkgo, and walnut.

In 2012, Frogner Park received the Nordic quality label Green Space Award, the first Norwegian green space to do so.

== Wegner's romantic park ==
Wegner's romantic park was built around 1840 by the manor's then-owners Benjamin Wegner and Henriette Wegner. The Wegner park replaced the old baroque garden. It was built in a romantic garden style that had replaced the baroque ideal in the late 18th century.

== Vigeland installation – the sculptures in Frogner Park ==
The Vigeland installation (Norwegian: Vigelandsanlegget), originally called the Tørtberg installation, is located in the present centre of Frogner Park. It is the name of the arrangement of sculptures and not of an area as such, as the entire park is called Frogner Park. (Note: The Vigeland installation in Frogner Park is sometimes referred to as "Vigeland Park," but this name has no official status, is not commonly used in Oslo and is considered inaccurate; the director of Oslo Museum Lars Roede said "Vigeland Park" "doesn't really exist" and is "the name of the tourists," as opposed to "Oslo natives' more down-to-earth name, Frogner Park." The legal name of the entire park in accordance with the Place Name Act (stadnamnlova) is Frognerparken (Frogner Park). The sculpture installation was, as part of Frogner Park, protected under the Heritage Act on 13 February 2009 under the name Frogner Park and the Vigeland installation (Norwegian: Frognerparken og Vigelandsanlegget), enshrining its name Vigelandsanlegget in law.)

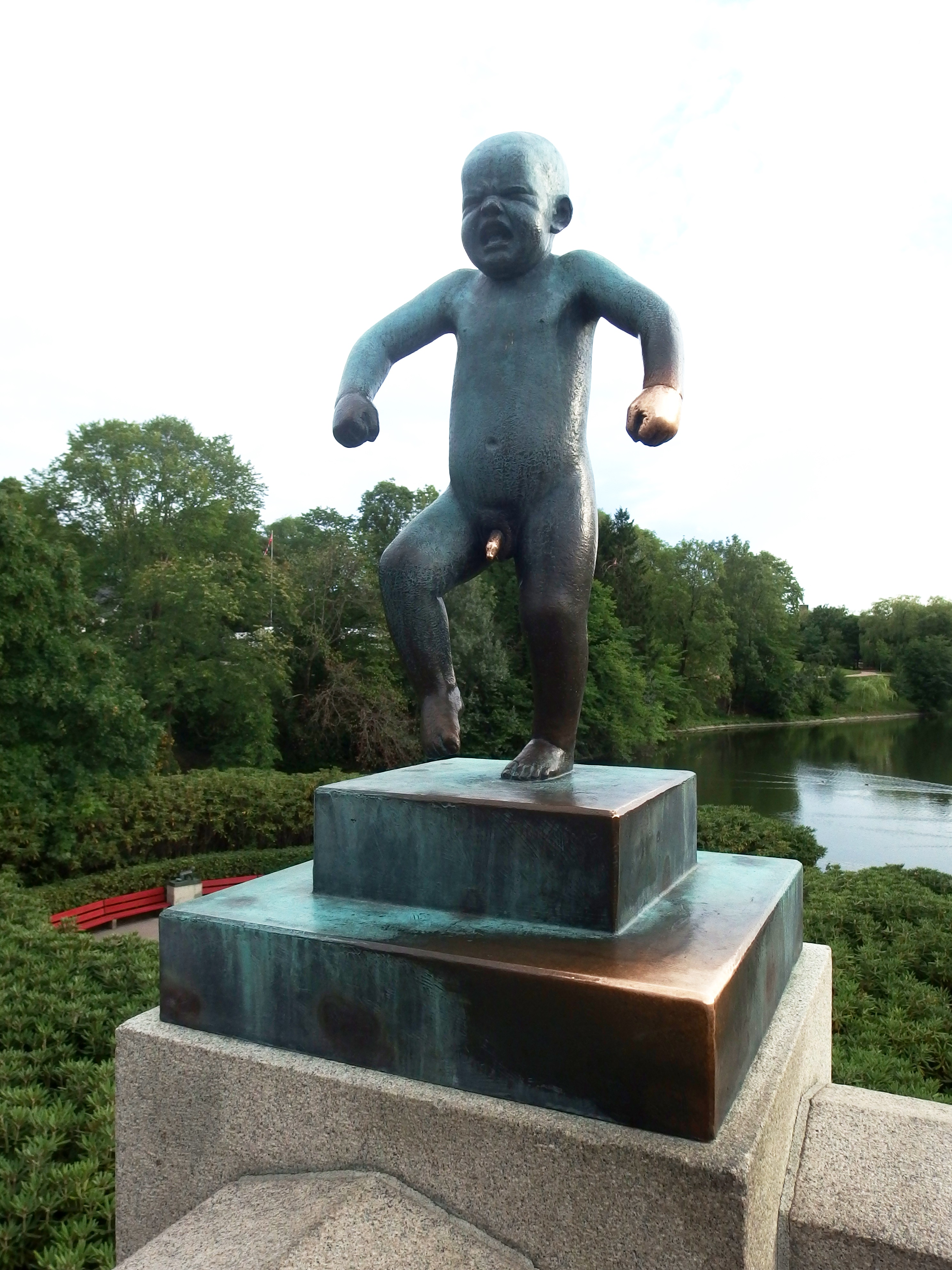
The Angry Boy

The sculpture area in Frogner Park covers 80 acres (320,000 m^{2}) and features 212 bronze and granite sculptures, all designed by Gustav Vigeland. The Bridge was the first part to be opened to the public, in 1940. The Bridge forms a 100 metre (328 ft)-long, 15 metre (49 ft)-wide connection between the Main Gate and the Fountain, lined with 58 sculptures, including one of the park's more popular statues, Angry Boy (Sinnataggen). Visitors could enjoy the sculptures while most of the park was still under construction. At the end of the bridge lies the Children's Playground, a collection of eight bronze statues showing children at play.

Most of the statues in the park are made of Iddefjord granite.

Originally designed to stand in Eidsvolls plass in front of the Parliament of Norway, the bronze Fountain (Fontenen) is adorned with 60 individual bronze reliefs, and is surrounded by an 1800 square metre black and white granite mosaic.

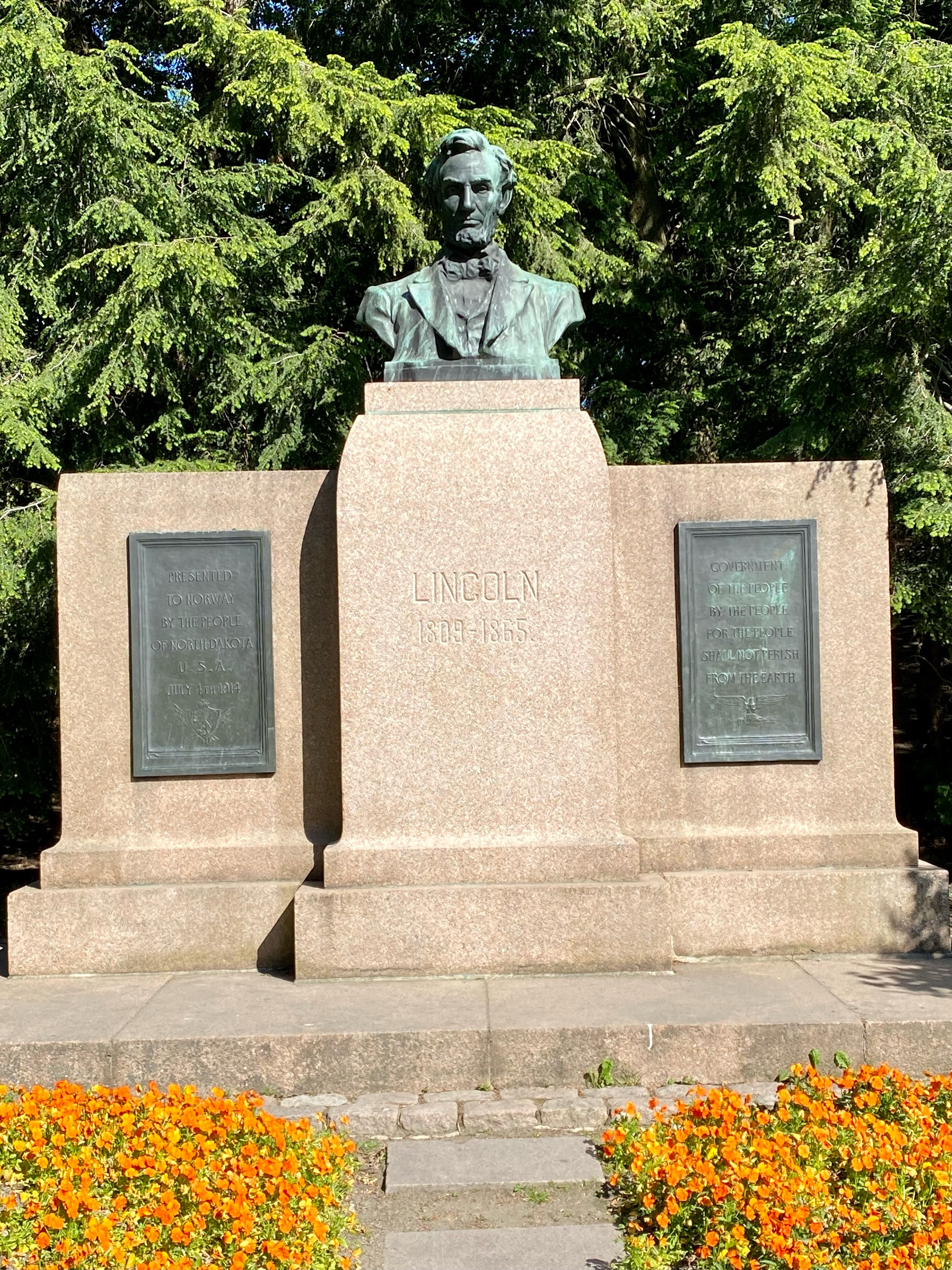
Lincoln Monument

The Vigeland installation's granite and wrought iron Main Gate also serves as the eastern entrance to Frogner Park from Kirkeveien. From there an 850 m (2,790 ft) long axis leads west through the Bridge to the Fountain and the Monolith, and ends with the Wheel of Life. The Main Gate consists of five large gates, two small pedestrian gates and two copper-roofed gate houses, both adorned with weather vanes. It was designed in 1926, redesigned in the 1930s and erected in 1942. It was financed by a Norwegian bank.

The Monolith Plateau is a platform in the north of Frogner Park made of steps that houses the Monolith totem itself. 36 figure groups reside on the elevation, representing a "circle of life" theme. Access to the Plateau is via eight wrought iron gates depicting human figures. The gates were designed between 1933 and 1937 and erected shortly after Vigeland died in 1943.

At the highest point in Frogner Park lies the park's most popular attraction, the Monolitten, which is a genuine monolith, being fabricated from one piece of solid stone. Construction of the massive monument began in 1924 when Gustav Vigeland modelled it in clay in his studio in Frogner. The design process took ten months, and it is supposed that Vigeland used sketches drafted in 1919. A model was then cast in plaster.

In the autumn of 1927 a block of granite weighing several hundred tons was delivered to the park from a quarry in Halden. It was erected a year later and a wooden shed was built around it to keep out the elements. Vigeland’s plaster model was erected next to it for reference. Transferring the design began in 1929 and took three masons 14 years to accomplish. The Monolitten was first shown to the public at Christmas 1944, and 180,000 people crowded into the wooden shed to get a close look at the creation. The shed was demolished shortly afterwards. The Monolitten towers 14.12 metres (46.32 ft) high and is composed of 121 human figures rising towards the sky.

At the end of the installation's axis there is a sundial, forged in 1930 (there is also an 1830s sundial outside the manor house in the south of the park), and finally the Wheel of Life stone sculpture, carved 1933–1934. The wheel depicts four adults, a child and a baby (the baby and child are on opposite sides).

The latest addition to the park is a statue titled Surprised (Overrasket), originally completed in plaster in 1942 only months before one of the models for the work, Austrian refugee Ruth Maier, was sent to Auschwitz and murdered. A bronze cast made in 2002 is now installed in the park.

== Sports and bathing facilities ==
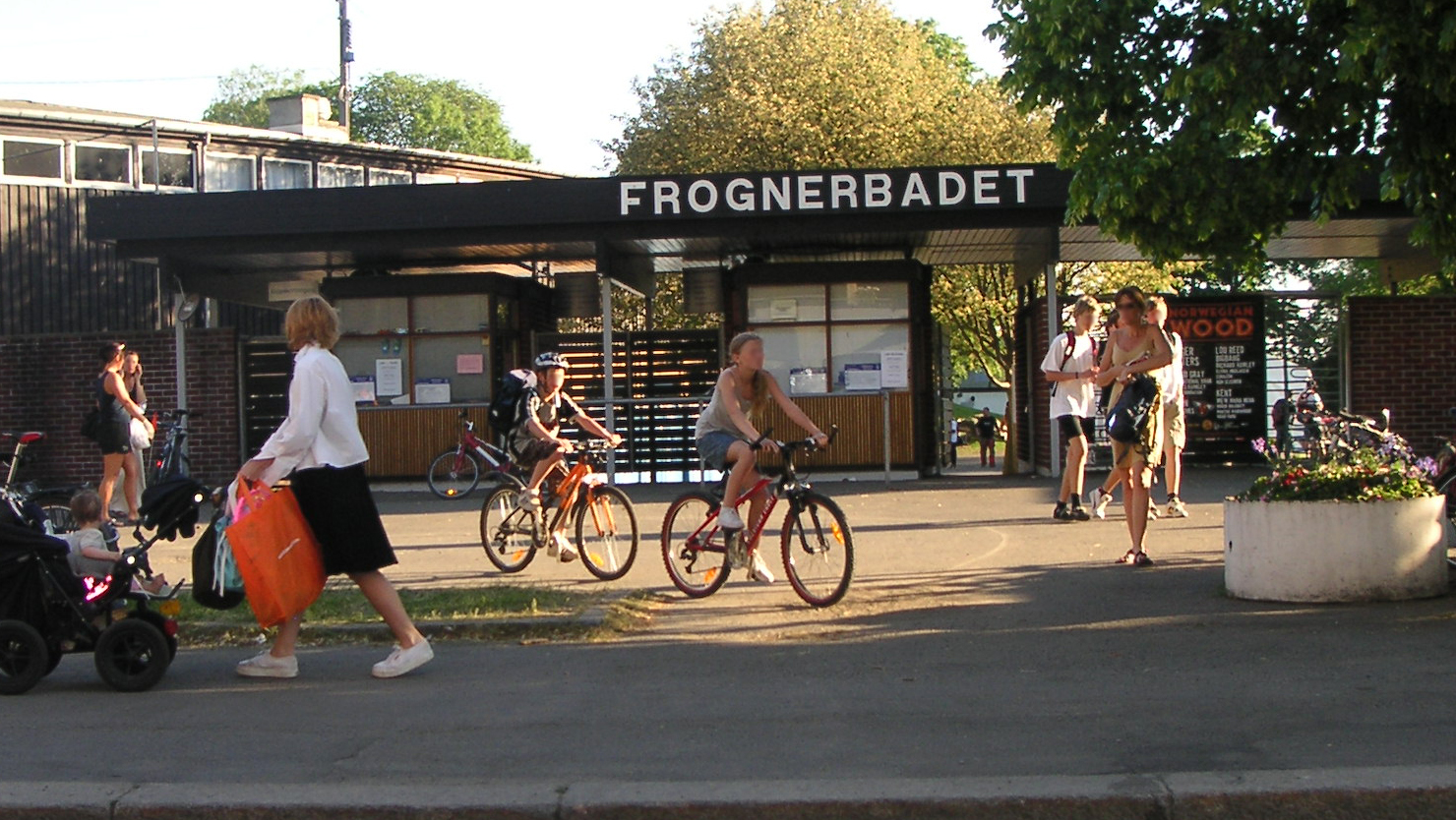
Entrance of Frognerbadet

On the outskirts of Frogner Park is Frognerbadet (Frogner Baths), which opened in 1956. Old Frogner Stadium opened in 1901 and was the city's main arena for skating. In 1914 the current Frogner Stadium was built right next to the old stadium. At the site of the old Frogner Stadium, there are now tennis courts.

== In popular culture ==
- The book The Doomsday Key written by author James Rollins has scenes in Frogner Park
- The Norwegian movie Elling features a scene in which the sex-obsessed Kjell-Bjarne admires the sculptures of the park with Elling.
- The science fiction novel Mockymen by Ian Watson utilizes the park as a plot point.
- The song "Vigeland's Dream"' on Eleanor McEvoy's album Out There describes a walk in the park.
- The science fiction novella The State of the Art by Iain M Banks includes a walk in the park by the main characters.
- In the detective thriller The Leopard, part of the Harry Hole series, Frogner Park is the scene of a sensational murder case.
- In the TV series The Love Boat, some of the crew visited and saw the Vigeland sculptures in Frogner Park in a two-episode special.
- The 2017 film The Snowman features scenes in the park.

== Transport ==
Frogner Park can be accessed by different means of public transport.

The Frogner Line of the Oslo Tramway and Bus Route 20 (Skøyen–Galgeberg) both service three stops to the east of the Frogner Park; Frogner plass, Frogner stadion and the controversially named Vigelandsparken. The latter is located in front of a large gate often incorrectly assumed by tourists to be the "main gate" to the park. The name "Vigelandsparken" is not an official name of the park and was, according to the Friends of Frogner Park association, chosen because tourists mistakenly believe it to be the name of the park, despite not being used locally.

The Oslo Metro also services stations in the vicinity of Frogner Park (Majorstuen, Borgen).

== Gallery ==
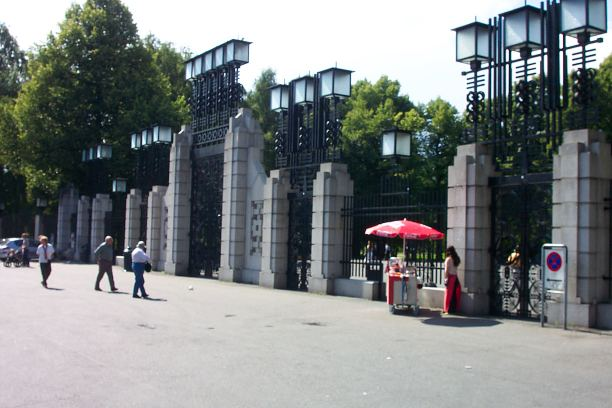
Frogner Park's front gate

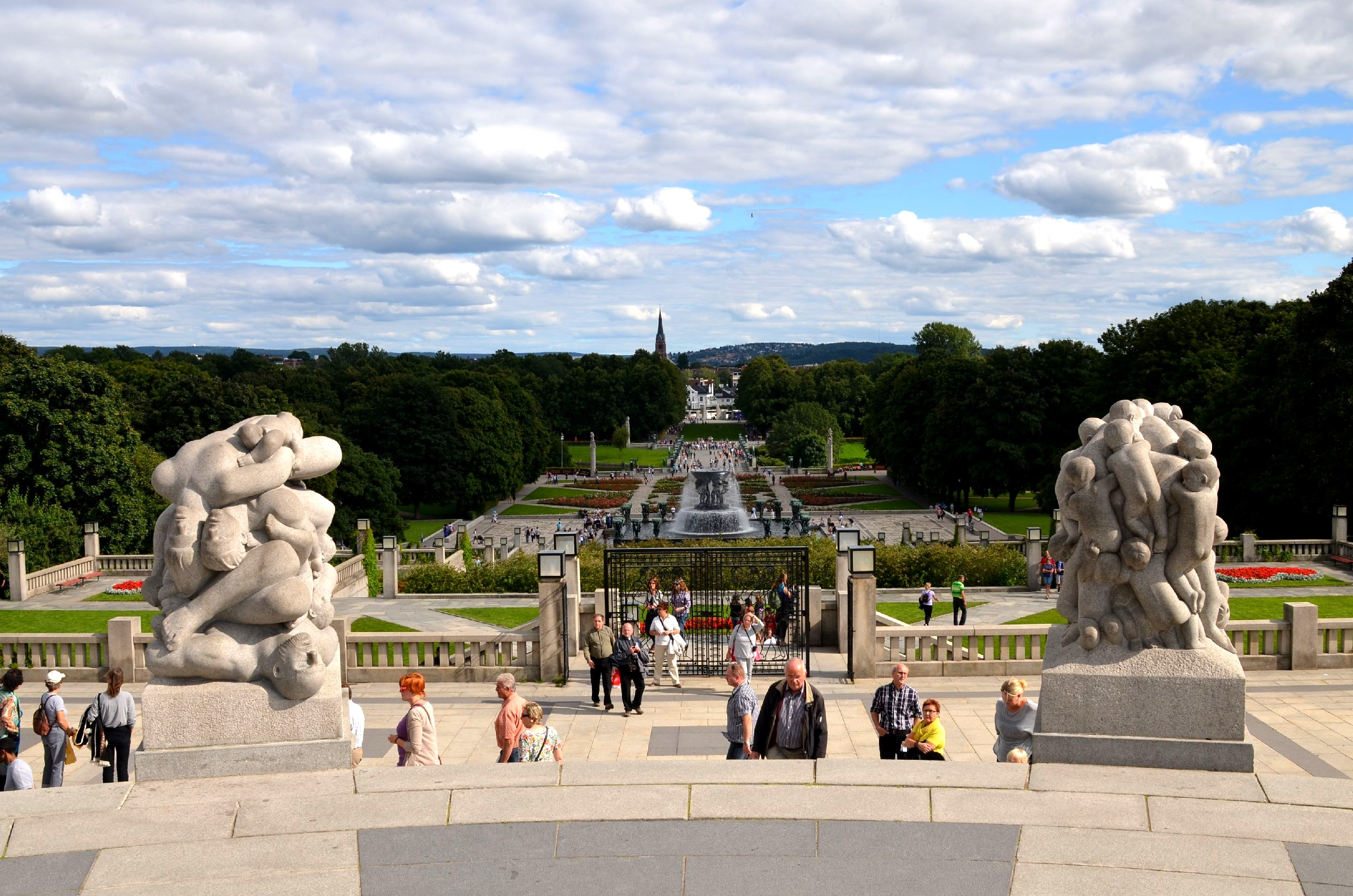

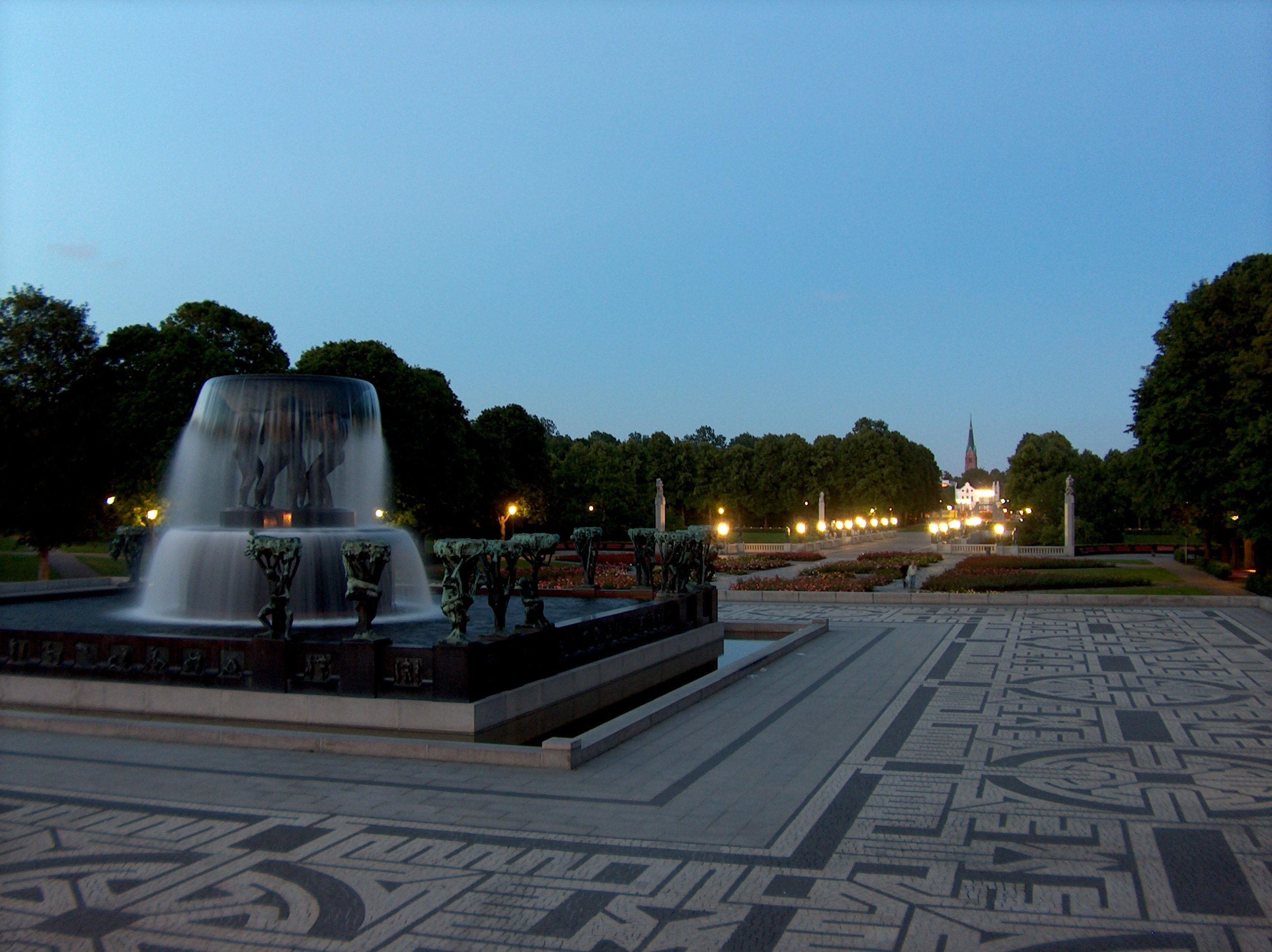

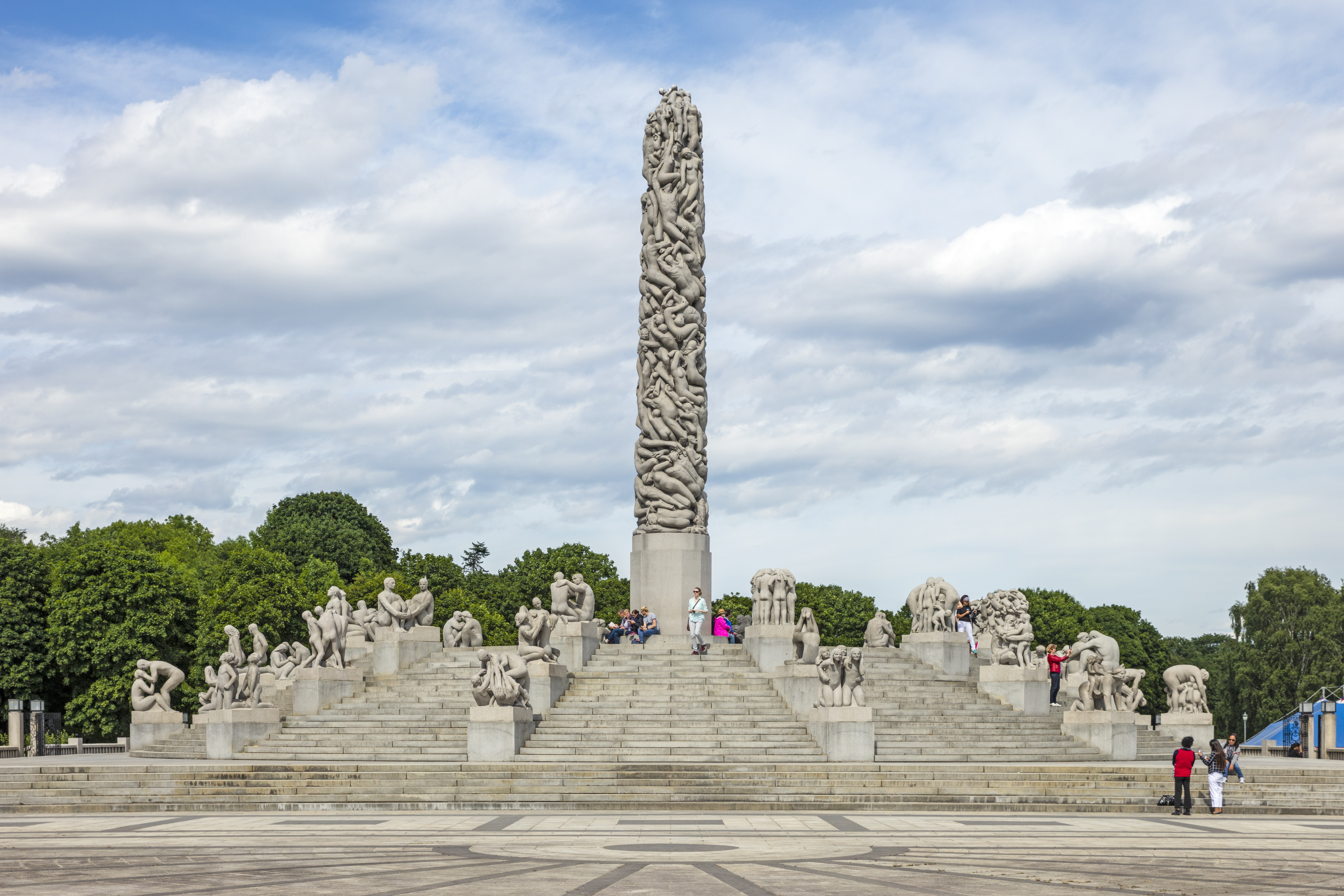
The monolith

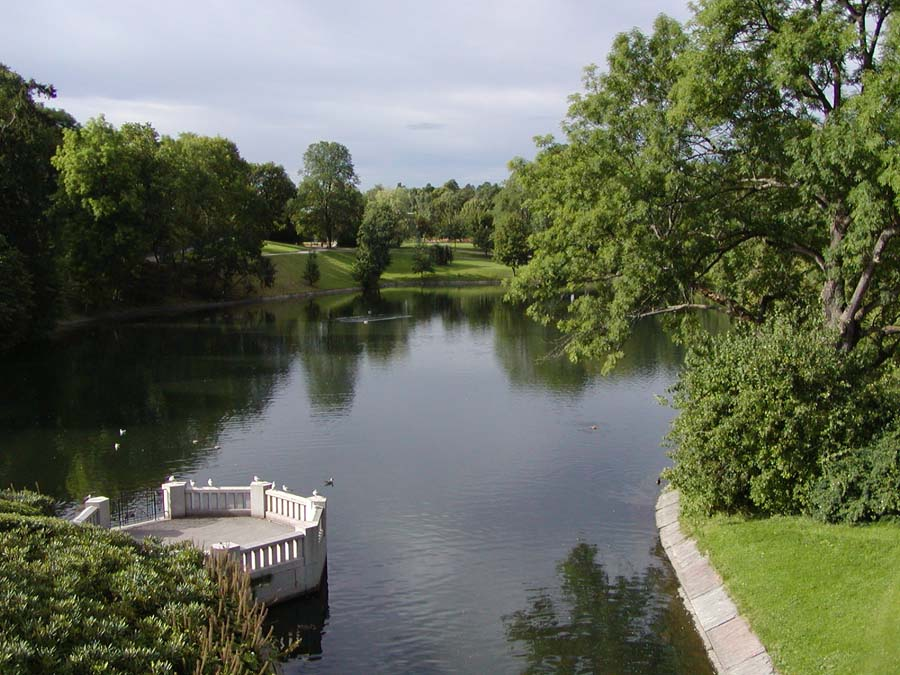
Frogner Pond seen from the main bridge

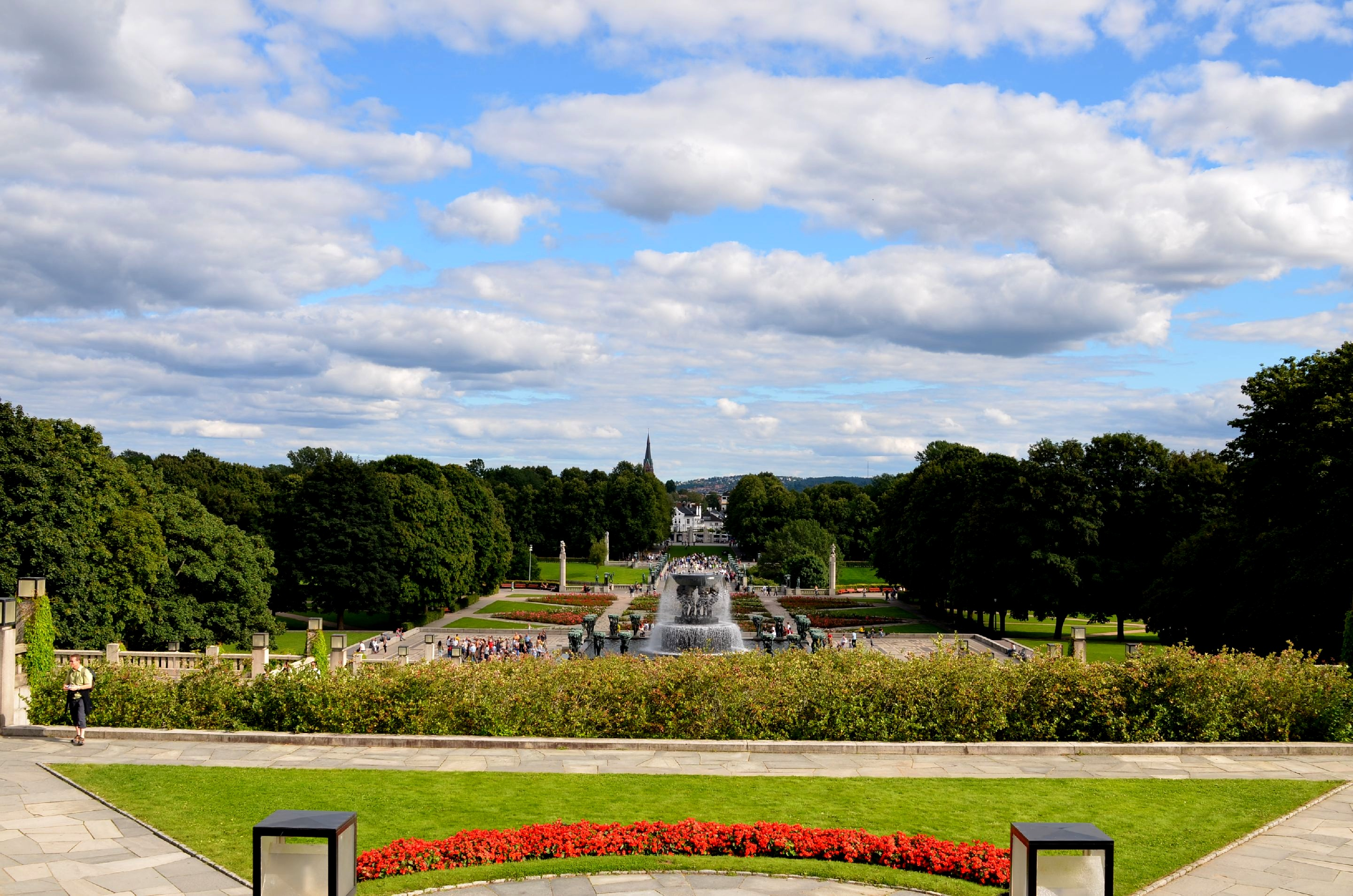
Frogner Park

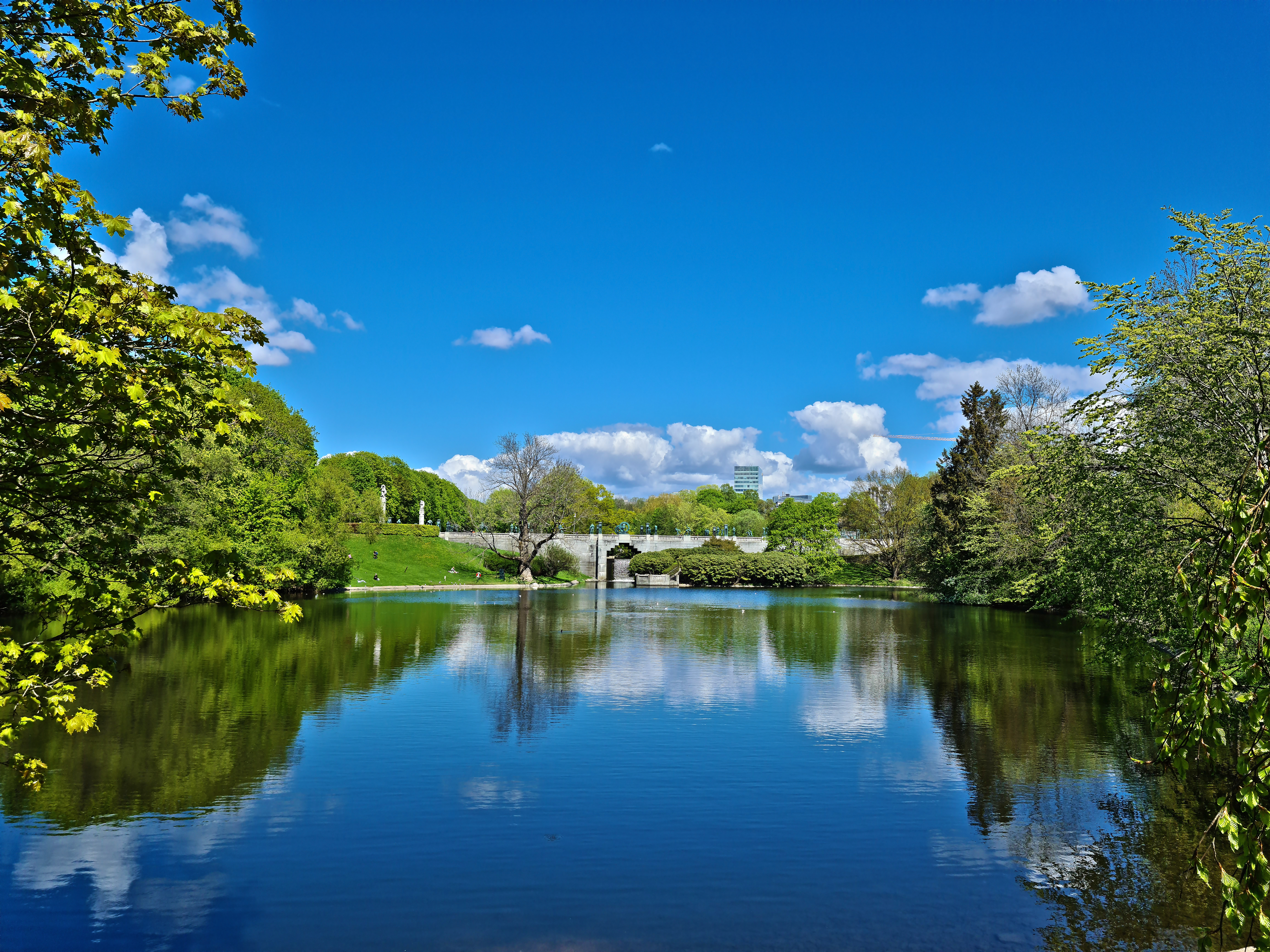
Frogner Pond

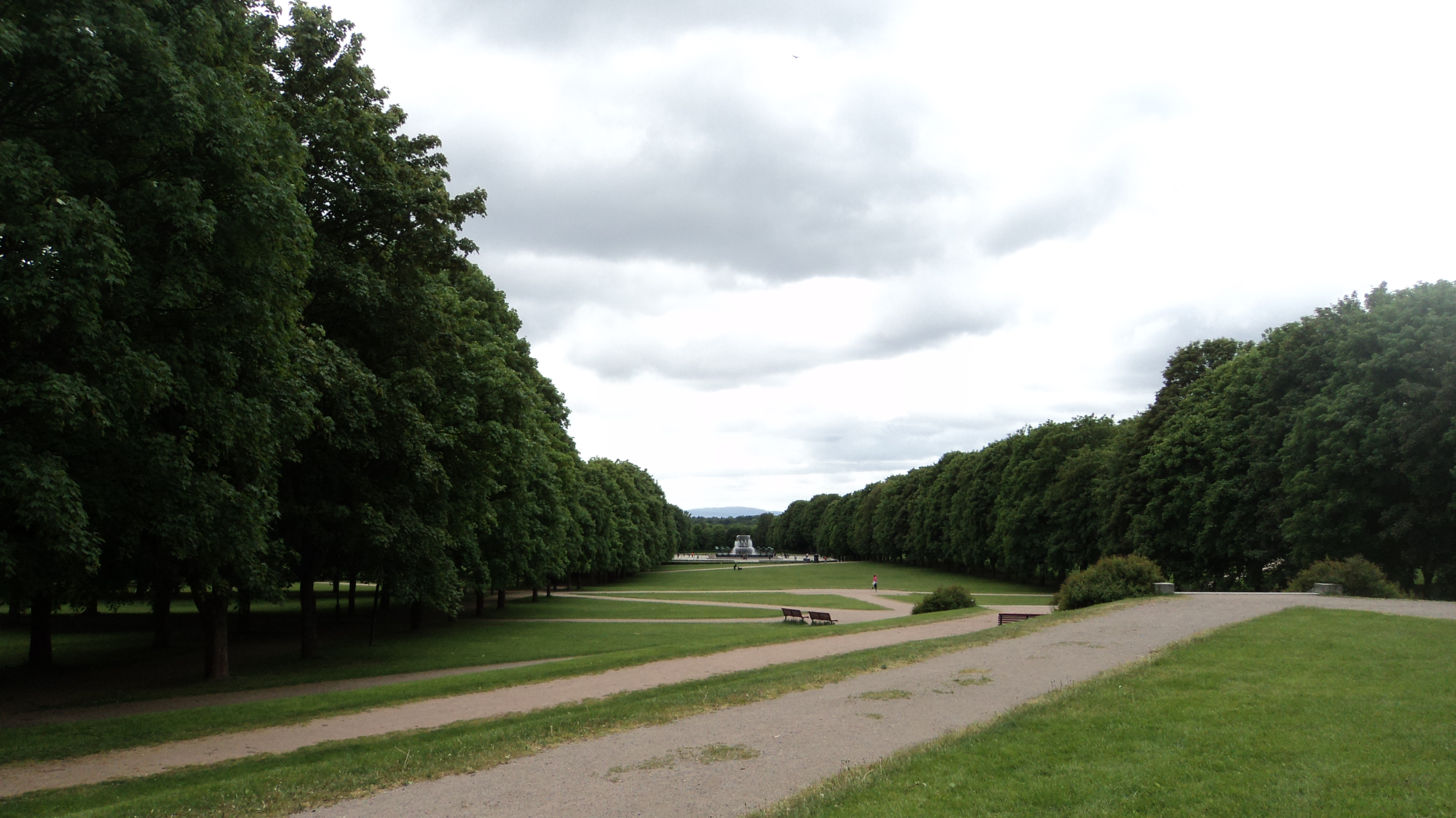

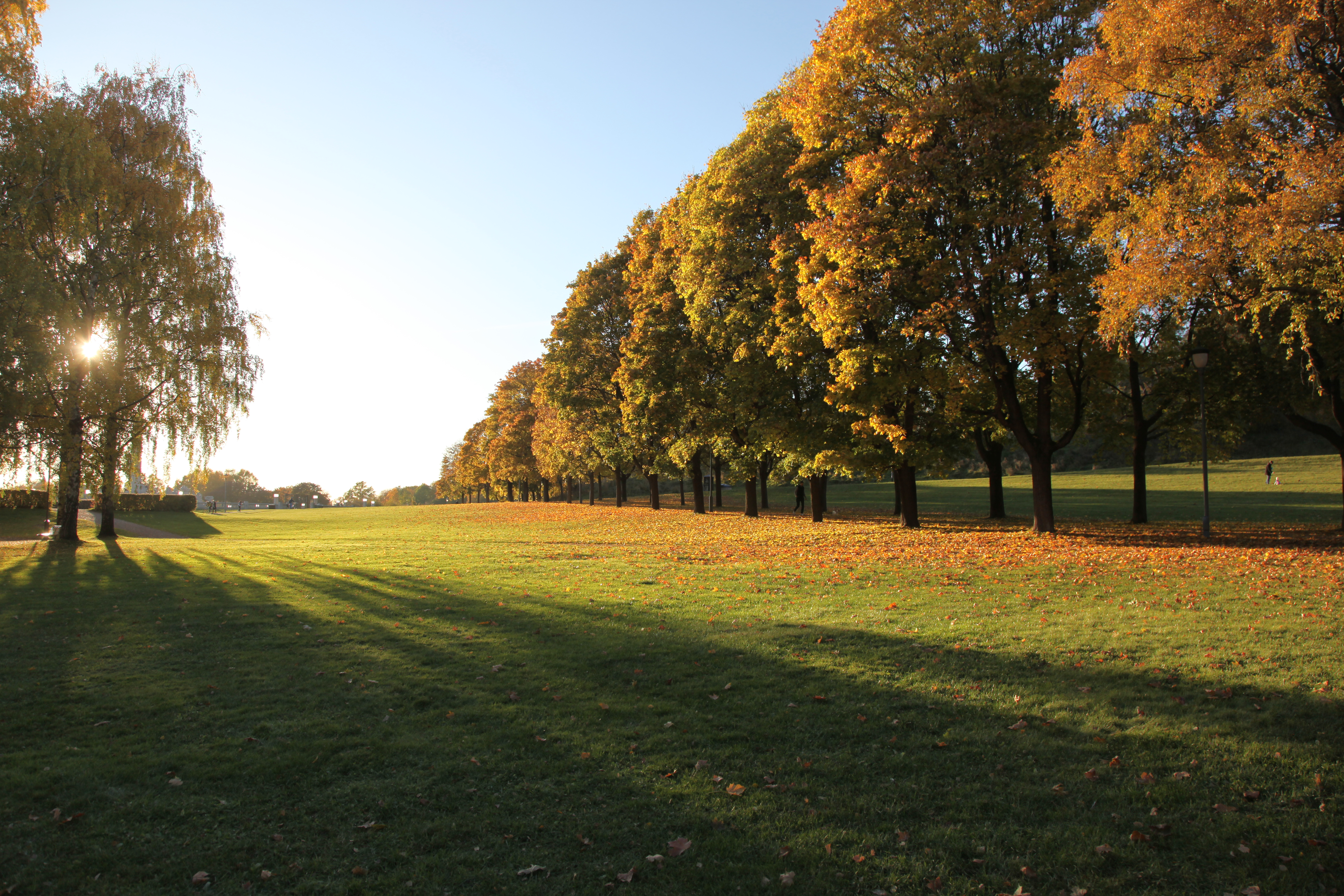

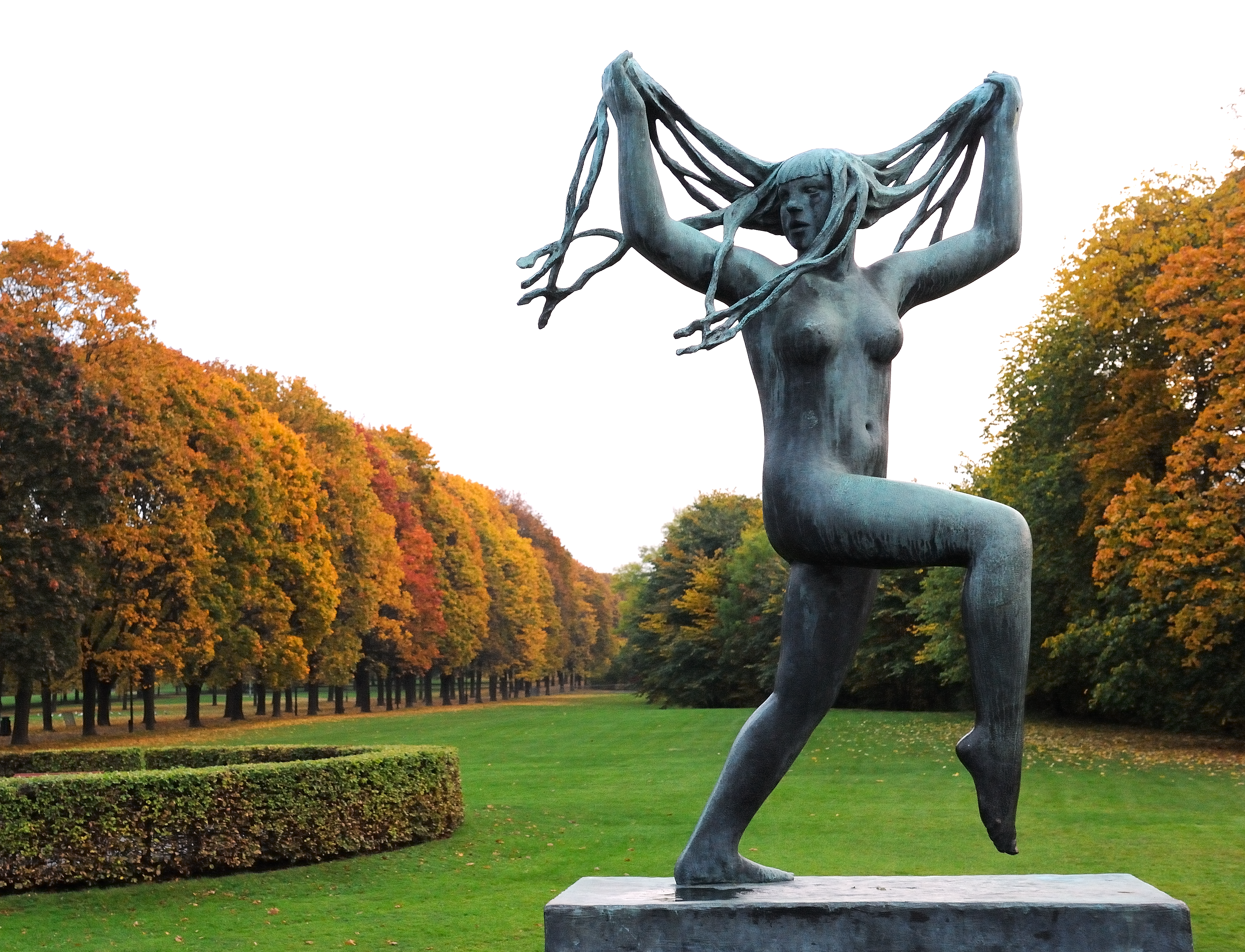
