= Henriette Wegner Pavilion =

- Henriette Wegners paviljong
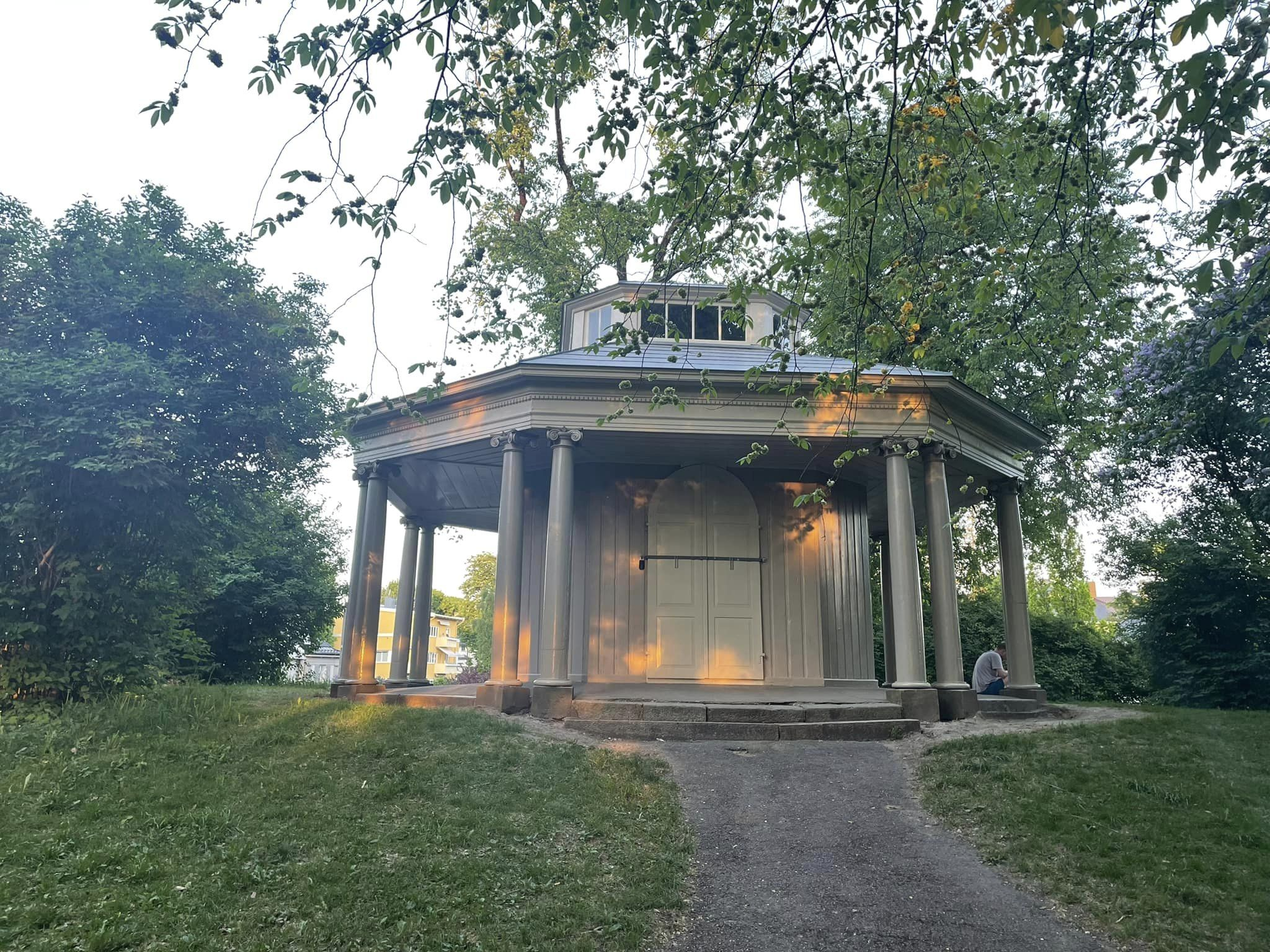
- Wegner pavilion
- Interactive map of the Henriette Wegner Pavilion area

General information
- Type: Round temple
- Architectural style: Neoclassical architecture
- Location: Frogner Manor, 0266 Oslo
- Coordinates: 59.9232212°N 10.7051111°E
- Named for: Henriette Wegner
- Completed: 1820s
- Owner: Oslo Museum

The Henriette Wegner Pavilion (Norwegian: Henriette Wegners paviljong) or the Wegner Pavilion (Norwegian: Wegnerpaviljongen) a classical tea pavilion and small art gallery in Frogner Park, Oslo. It was built around 1824 at Blaafarveværket and moved to Frogner Manor's Frogner Park in 1837. It commemorates the philanthropist and women's rights pioneer Henriette Wegner, and was given to her as a wedding gift by her husband, mining magnate Benjamin Wegner after their 1824 wedding in her native Hamburg. It is located within the section of Frogner Park known as Wegner Park, the romantic park built for the Wegners around 1840. The Henriette Wegner Pavilion is the oldest structure of Frogner Park after the manor house itself.

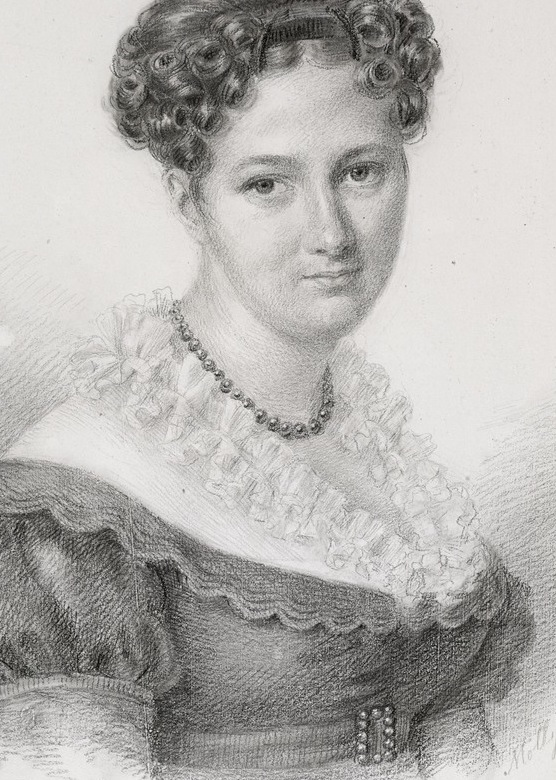
Henriette Wegner, drawn by her sister Molly Seyler in 1827, around the time the pavilion was built

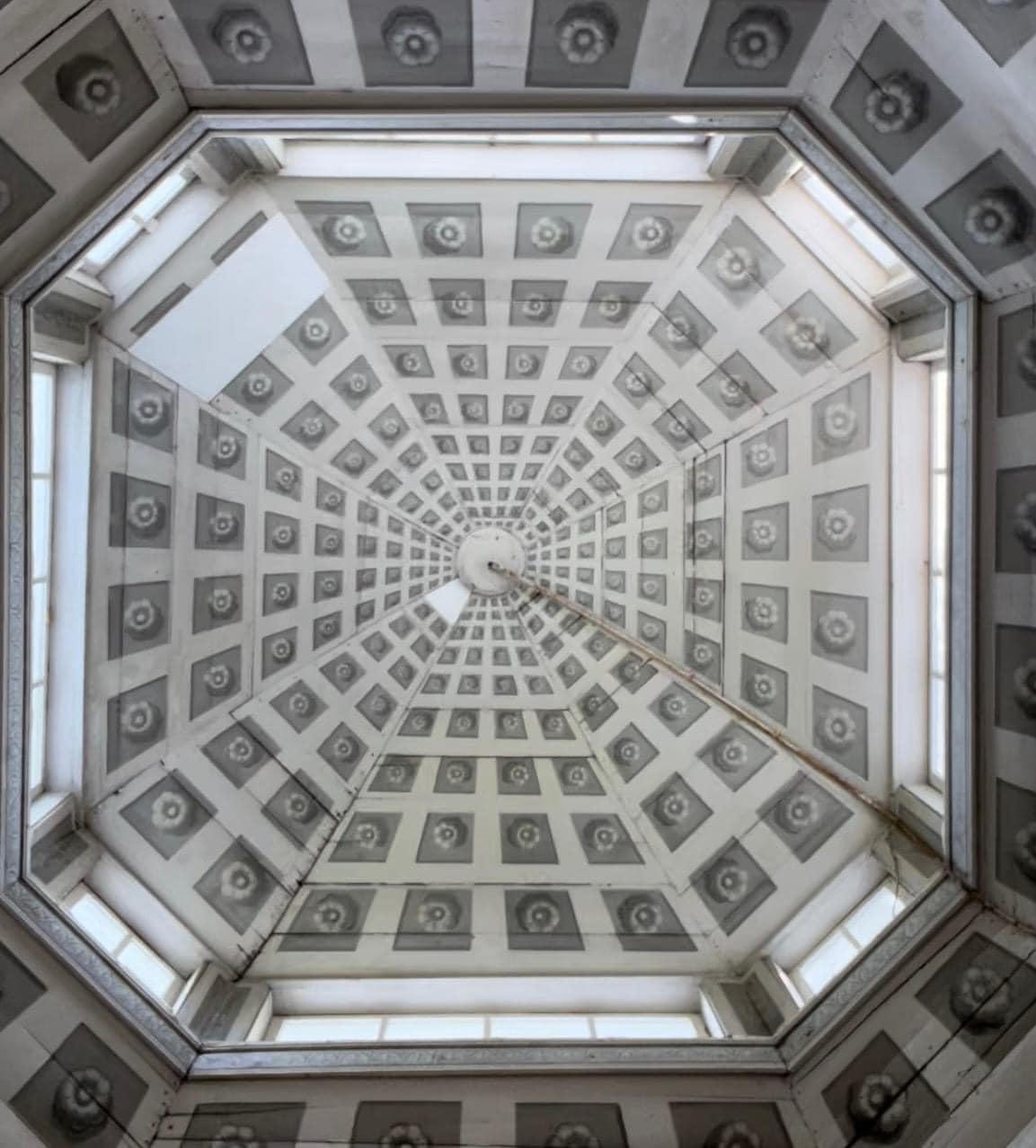
The ceiling of the 1824 Henriette Wegner Pavilion is a painted miniature copy of the dome over the Pantheon temple in Rome

It is part of Oslo Museum and is located near the manor house of Frogner Manor. It is located on a small hill on the edge of Frogner Park that is known as Utsikten ("The View"). The pavilion is listed as a protected cultural heritage site. The pavilion is shaped like a classic octagonal round temple with a colonnade, inspired by structures from Greco-Roman antiquity but made with Norwegian materials. The ceiling is a painted miniature copy of the dome over the Pantheon temple in Rome, which makes the room feel larger than it actually is.

It was built around 1824 at Fossum Manor at Blaafarveværket, where the young Wegner couple lived as Benjamin Wegner had become a co-owner and the director of Blaafarveværket in 1822. It was moved to Frogner Park after Wegner bought Frogner Manor in 1836. The park is located within Wegner Park, the romantic landscape park built around 1840 for the Wegner family within today's (larger) Frogner Park. Henriette and Benjamin Wegner have descendants in, among others, the Wegner, Paus, and Nørregaard families.

The pavilion is occasionally open to the public as an artist-run art gallery and used for smaller cultural events during the summer.
