= Wegner (Norwegian family) =

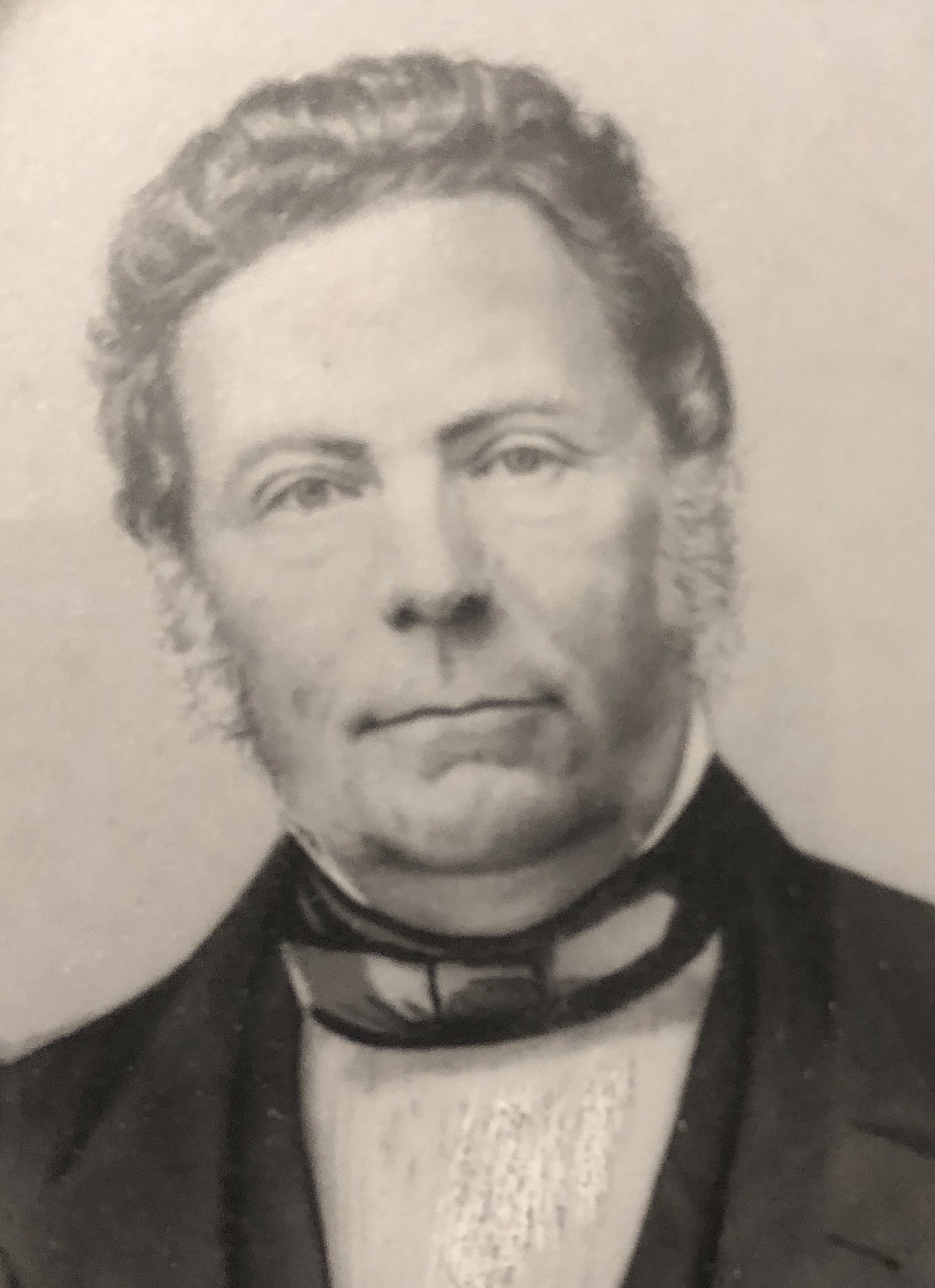
The industrialist Benjamin Wegner

Wegner is a Norwegian family whose members have been noted as business magnates, estate owners, timber merchants and lawyers. The Norwegian family is descended from the industrialist Benjamin Wegner and his wife Henriette Wegner, a member of the Berenberg banking dynasty of Hamburg. Born in Königsberg, Benjamin Wegner worked as a businessman in London and Berlin before moving to Norway in 1822 to become managing director and a co-owner of Blaafarveværket, that became Norway's largest mining company and largest industrial company overall under his leadership. He thus was one of the most important early industrial pioneers in the newly independent Norway and one of Norway's leading industrialists from the early to mid-19th century. He also owned Frogner Manor and was a major co-owner of Hassel Iron Works, the Juel, Wegner & Co. timber company and the large Hafslund manor and estate that included around 340,000 decares of forest. He also served as consul-general of the city-states of Hamburg, Lübeck and Bremen.

== History ==
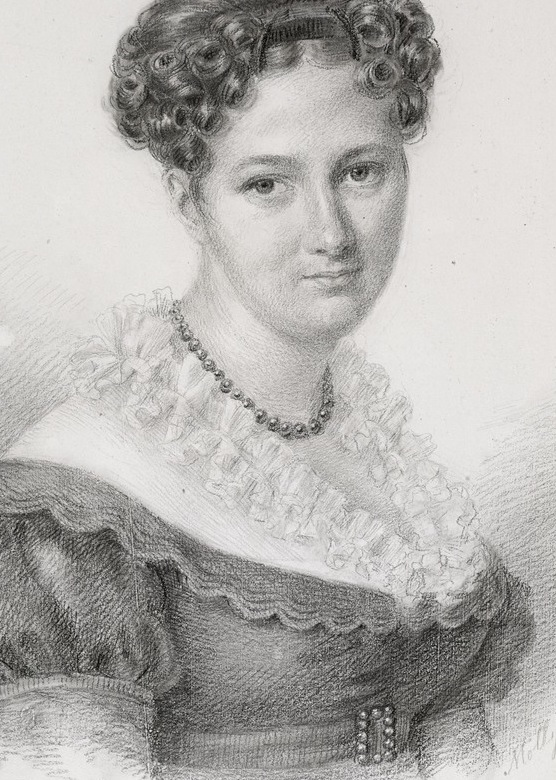
Henriette Wegner, daughter of co-owner of Berenberg Bank L.E. Seyler

The family is descended from the industrialist (Jacob) Benjamin Wegner (1795–1864), who was born in Königsberg and who emigrated to Norway in 1822 to become managing director and co-owner of Norway's largest industrial enterprise, Blaafarveværket. He also became the largest co-owner of Hafslund, one of Norway's largest estates, owner of Frogner Manor in Aker (now Oslo), co-owner of the Hassel Ironworks and co-owner of the timber firm Juel, Wegner & Co. Very little is known about Benjamin Wegner's family background. He married Henriette Seyler (1805–1875) in St. Nicholas' Church, Hamburg, on 15 May 1824; she was a member of the Berenberg banking dynasty of Hamburg and the youngest daughter of Berenberg Bank's long-time co-owner and head L.E. Seyler and Anna Henriette Gossler; her grandfather was the theatre director Abel Seyler. The Wegner family lived at Fossum Manor in Modum until 1836, when they acquired Frogner Manor in what is now the borough of Frogner in west end Oslo.

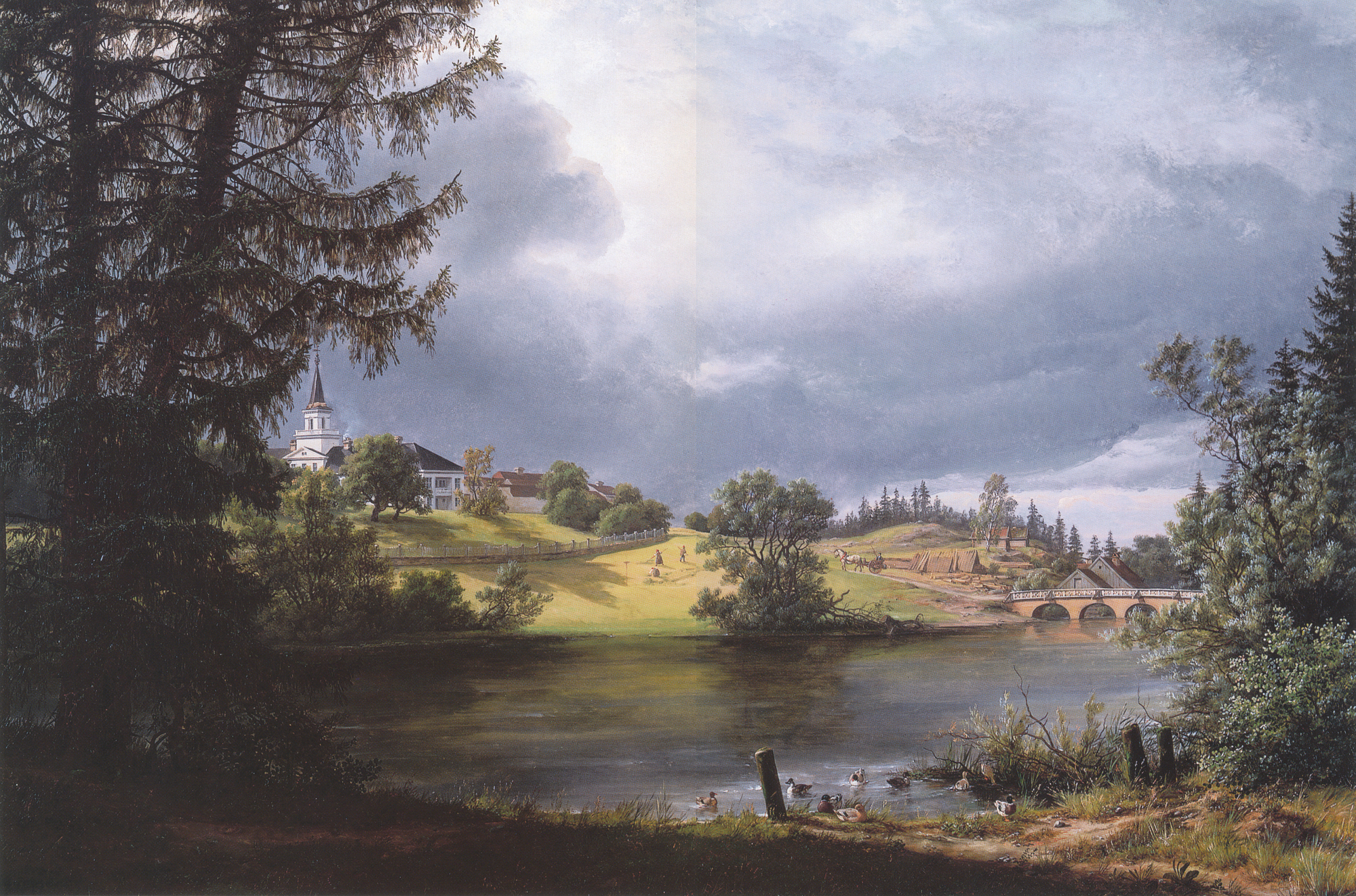
Frogner Manor, painted by I.C. Dahl for Benjamin Wegner.

Benjamin and Henriette Wegner had four sons and two daughters, all of whom were born in Norway, where they have many notable descendants. Their oldest son Johann Ludwig Wegner (1830–1893) was a judge and married Blanca Bretteville, a daughter of Prime Minister Christian Zetlitz Bretteville; their second son Heinrich Benjamin Wegner (1833–1911) was a timber merchant and married Henriette Vibe, a daughter of the classical philologist Ludvig Vibe; their oldest daughter Sophie Wegner (1838–1906) married colonel and aide-de-camp to the king Charles Hans Jacob Nørregaard; their youngest daughter Anna Henriette Wegner (1841–1918) married the theologian Bernhard Pauss; their youngest son George Wegner (1847–1881) was a supreme court barrister.

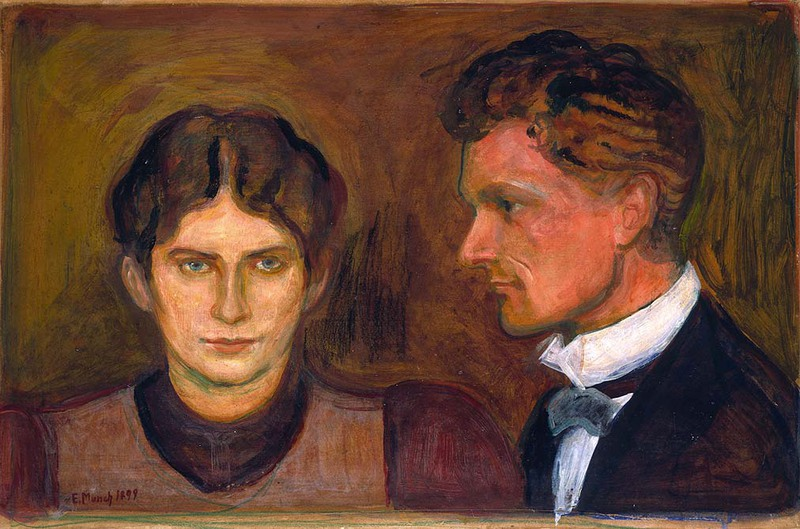
The noted lawyer Harald Nørregaard, Benjamin Wegner's grandson, painted by Edvard Munch in 1899

Johann Ludwig Wegner and Blanca Bretteville were the parents of the noted feminist Olga Wegner (1858–1943), who married supreme court justice Karenus Kristofer Thinn. They were the parents of the noted lawyer Jakob Thinn. Among Heinrich Benjamin Wegner's descendants are the lawyer, county governor and chief of police Benjamin Wegner (1868–1949), judge in Halden Rolf Benjamin Wegner (1898–1986), chief of police Rolf B(enjamin) Wegner (born 1940) and judge in Asker and Bærum Jens-Sveinung Wegner (born 1948).

Sophie Wegner was the mother of the internationally renowned war correspondent Benjamin Wegner Nørregaard, who served as Minister of the Interior in the Tianjin Provisional Government in China, of the barrister and President of the Norwegian Bar Association Harald Nørregaard, who founded the law firm (now known as) Hjort, and of the wine merchant and consul in Tarragona Ludvig Nørregaard. Henriette Wegner was the mother of the surgeon and President of the Norwegian Red Cross Nikolai Nissen Paus, of the lawyer and Director at the Norwegian Employers' Confederation George Wegner Paus and of the industrial leader Augustin Paus.
