= Henriette Wegner =

Norwegian businesswoman and philanthropist

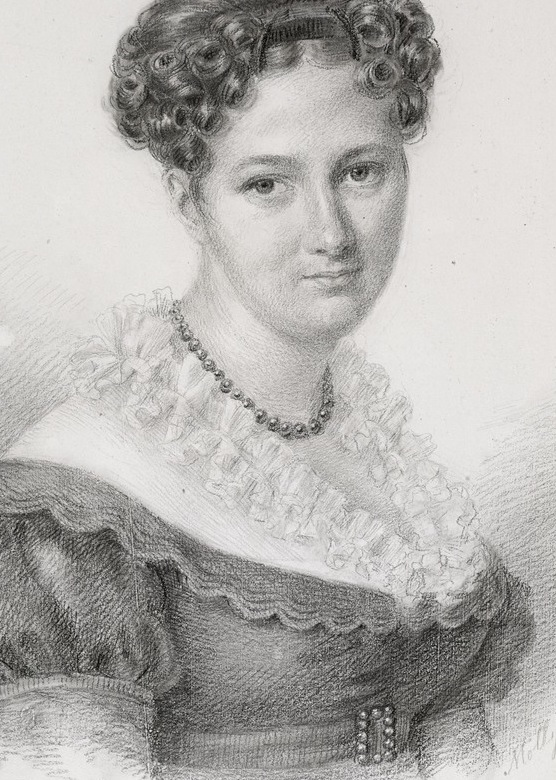
- Henriette Wegner, drawn by her sister Molly in 1827, aged 22
- Born: Henriette Seyler; October 1, 1805; Hamburg
- Died: November 25, 1875 (aged 70); Christiania, Norway
- Resting place: Old Aker Cemetery, Oslo
- Citizenship: Hamburg, France, Norway
- Spouse: Benjamin Wegner
- Parent(s): L.E. Seyler and Anna Henriette Gossler

Henriette Wegner (born 1 October 1805 in Hamburg, died 25 November 1875 in Christiania), née Henriette Seyler, was a Norwegian businesswoman and philanthropist. She was a member of the Hanseatic Berenberg banking dynasty of Hamburg and moved to Norway in 1824 when she married the mining magnate Benjamin Wegner. She was briefly a co-owner of Berenberg Bank, and became one of the wealthiest women of Norway on her husband's death as the main owner of one of the country's largest forest estates.

She was known for her work for the homeless and for improving the situation of women. With her long-time friend Hedvig Maribo she founded Norway's first women's organization, the Association for the Support of Poor Mothers, and served as one of its directors. She was a long-term board member of the Norwegian Charity for the Homeless. Henriette Wegner Pavilion in Frogner Park and the mine Henriette Grube at Blaafarveværket are named for her.

== Childhood in Hamburg ==
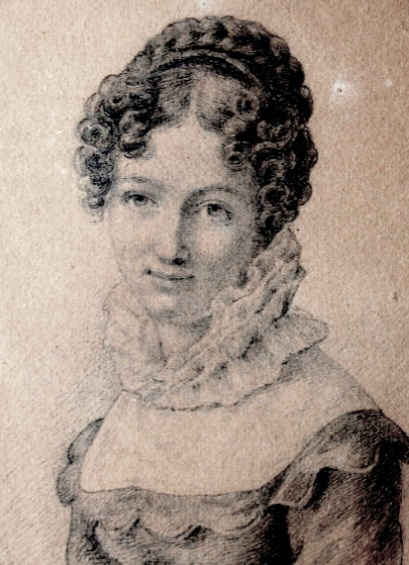
Henriette Seyler, drawn by her sister Molly in 1822, aged 17

Born Henriette Seyler in the city-republic of Hamburg, she was the youngest daughter of the banker L.E. Seyler and Anna Henriette Gossler, and a granddaughter of the Swiss-born theatre director Abel Seyler and of the Hamburg bankers Johann Hinrich Gossler and Elisabeth Berenberg, whose Belgian-origined family had founded Berenberg Bank in 1590. Her father L.E. Seyler was a co-owner of Berenberg Bank for 48 years as well as President of the Commerz-Deputation and a member of the Hamburg Parliament, and her family was one of Hamburg's most prominent Hanseatic families. On her father's side, she was a descendant of the Swiss Calvinist theologian Friedrich Seyler and of the Basel patrician families Burckhardt, Socin, Merian, Faesch and Meyer zum Pfeil; on her mother's side she was also descended from families like Amsinck and Welser.

The year after her birth, Hamburg was occupied by Napoleonic France and then briefly incorporated into the Bouches-de-l'Elbe département of the French Empire, before again becoming a sovereign city-republic after the Napoleonic Wars. During the French occupation, her father was held as a hostage along with a handful of the city's other prominent merchants for some time, and Berenberg Bank later moved its headquarters to their private home. Like most of Hamburg's elite, the family was fiercely Anglophile.

== Life in Norway ==
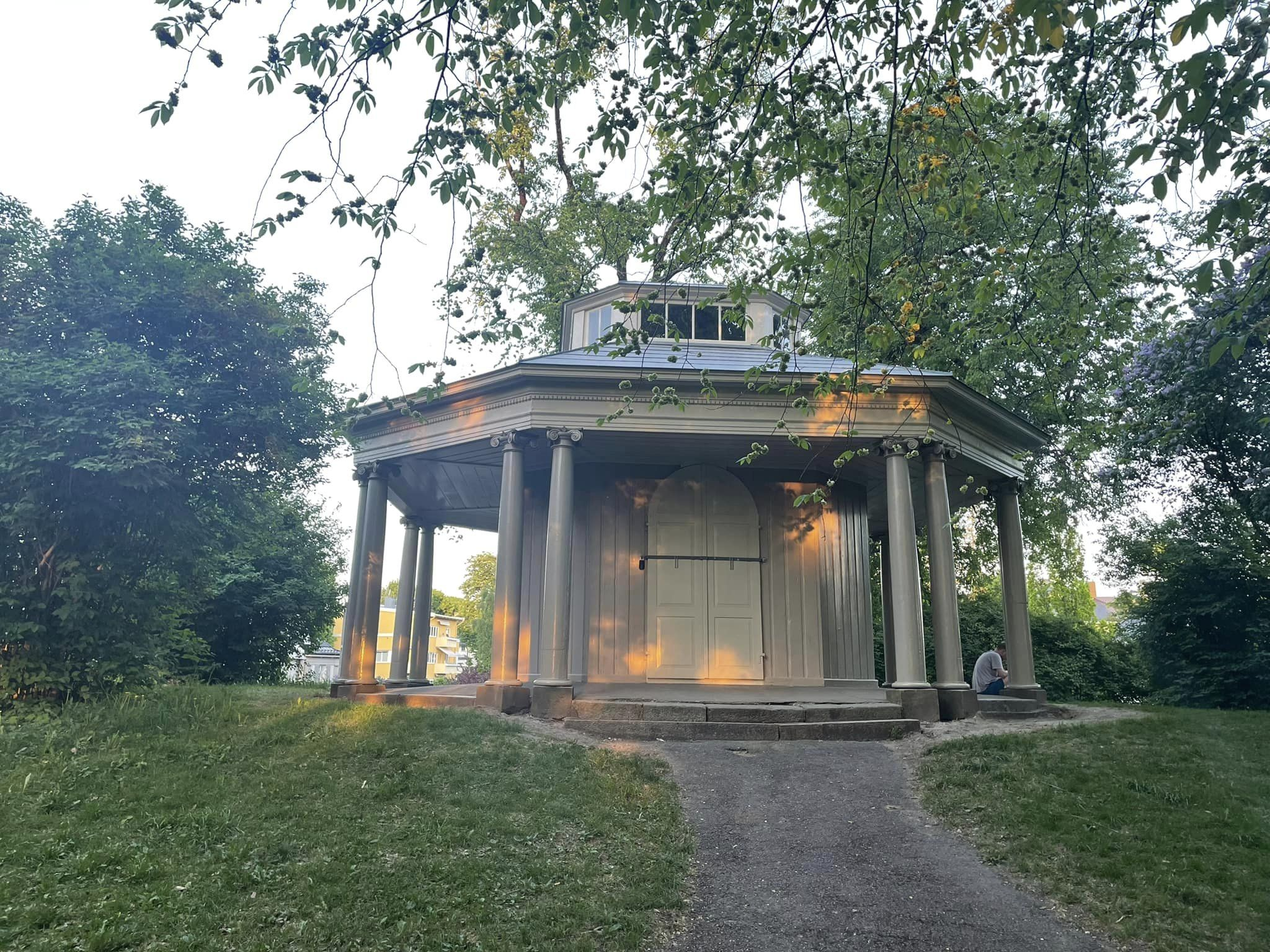
The Henriette Wegner Pavilion in Frogner Park was a wedding gift given to Henriette Wegner

On 15 May 1824, she married the businessman Benjamin Wegner in St. Nicholas' Church, Hamburg; born in Königsberg, he had two years earlier moved to Norway as director-general and co-owner of the Blue Color Works, a mining company and the world's largest manufacturer of cobalt blue as well as Norway's largest industrial enterprise. He later also acquired several other enterprises and estates in Norway. They lived at Fossum Manor until 1836, when they acquired Frogner Manor in what is now the borough of Frogner in west end Oslo; the estate also included Frognerseteren and parts of Nordmarka. The 1820s neoclassical Henriette Wegner Pavilion in Frogner Park was a wedding gift given to her, and was moved from the family's former home Fossum Manor in the late 1830s.

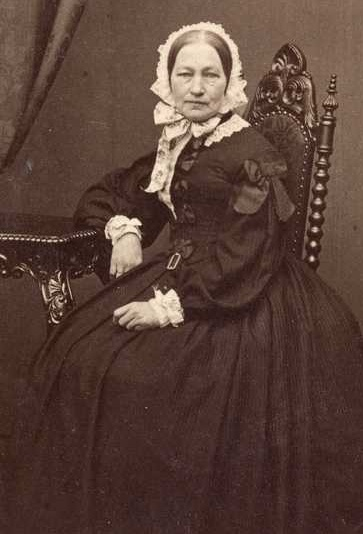
Henriette Wegner, ca. 1860

As the wife of one of Norway's leading industrialists and mistress of Frogner Manor, she was one of the leading women of Norwegian high society, particularly from the 1830s, when the family moved from rural Modum to Frogner Manor outside the capital. Following the death of her father, she was a co-owner of Berenberg Bank in Hamburg until 31 December 1836, although her interests were managed by her brother-in-law. By contemporaries, she was described as a "lovable" character. She was also noted for her social commitment, and was chairwoman and board member of the Norwegian Charity for the Homeless for over twenty years. She also endowed a substantial amount to helping the homeless.

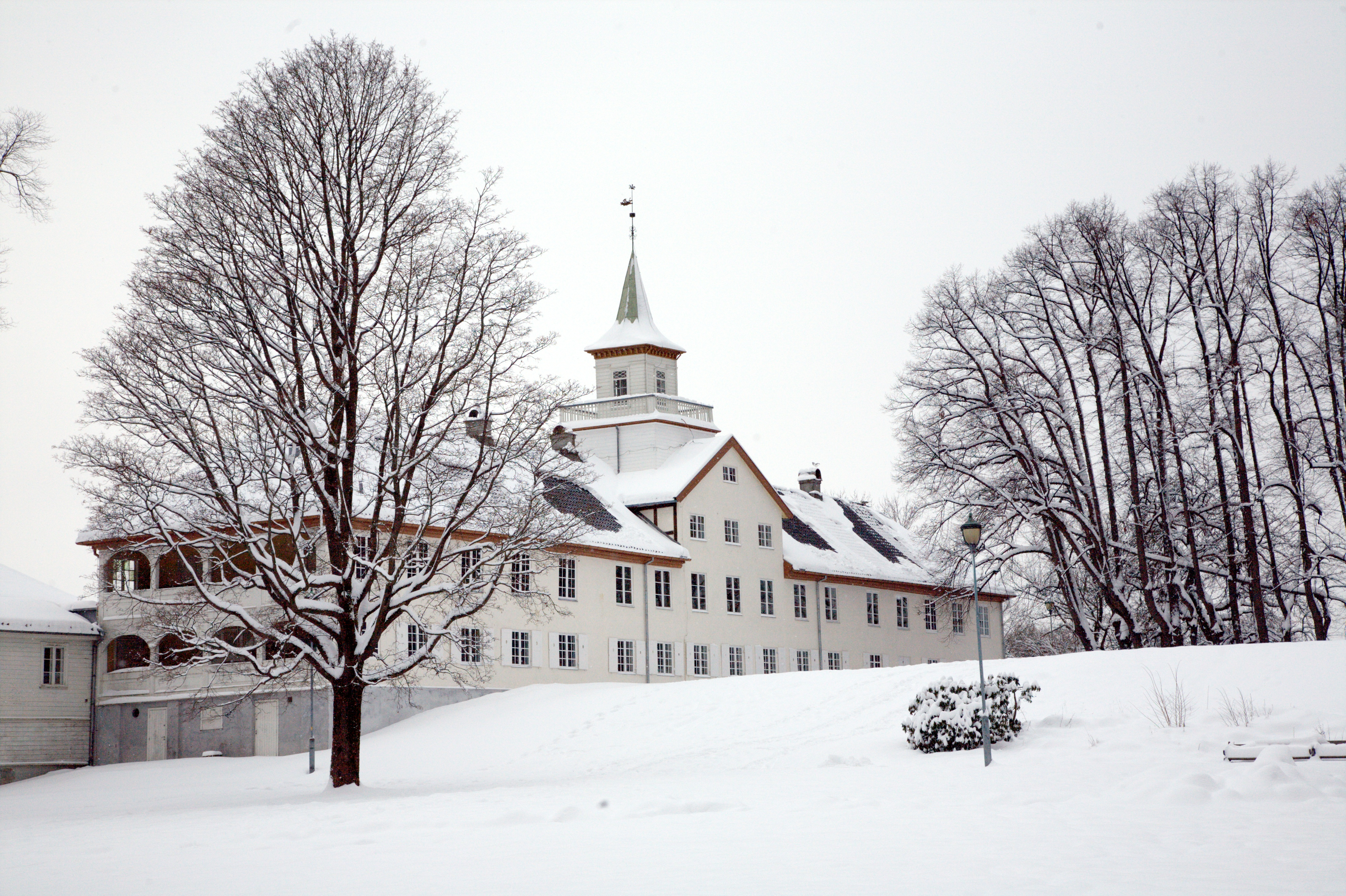
Frogner Manor

The author Willibald Alexis describes his visit to Benjamin and Henriette Wegner at Fossum Manor in the book Herbstreise durch Scandinavien ("An Autumn Journey through Scandinavia") from 1828.

She had six children, of which five survived into adulthood. Her oldest son Johann Ludwig Wegner (1830–1893) was a judge and married Blanca Bretteville, a daughter of Prime Minister Christian Zetlitz Bretteville; her second son Heinrich Benjamin Wegner (1833–1911) was a timber merchant and married Henriette Vibe, a daughter of the classical philologist Ludvig Vibe; her oldest daughter Sophie Wegner (1838–1906) married colonel and aide-de-camp to king Charles Hans Jacob Nørregaard; her youngest daughter Anna Henriette Wegner (1841–1918) married the theologian Bernhard Pauss; her youngest son George Wegner (1847–1881) was a supreme court barrister.

She was interred on 30 November 1875 at Gamle Aker Cemetery in Oslo.

== Literature ==
- Rolf B. Wegner (the Elder), Familien Wegner, Halden, 1963
- Rolf B. Wegner (the Younger): Mine tippoldeforeldre Henriethe og Benjamin Wegner forteller, 2013
