= Old Aker Church =

Church in Oslo, Norway

Old Aker Church Gamle Aker kirke
- Norwegian Cultural Heritage Site
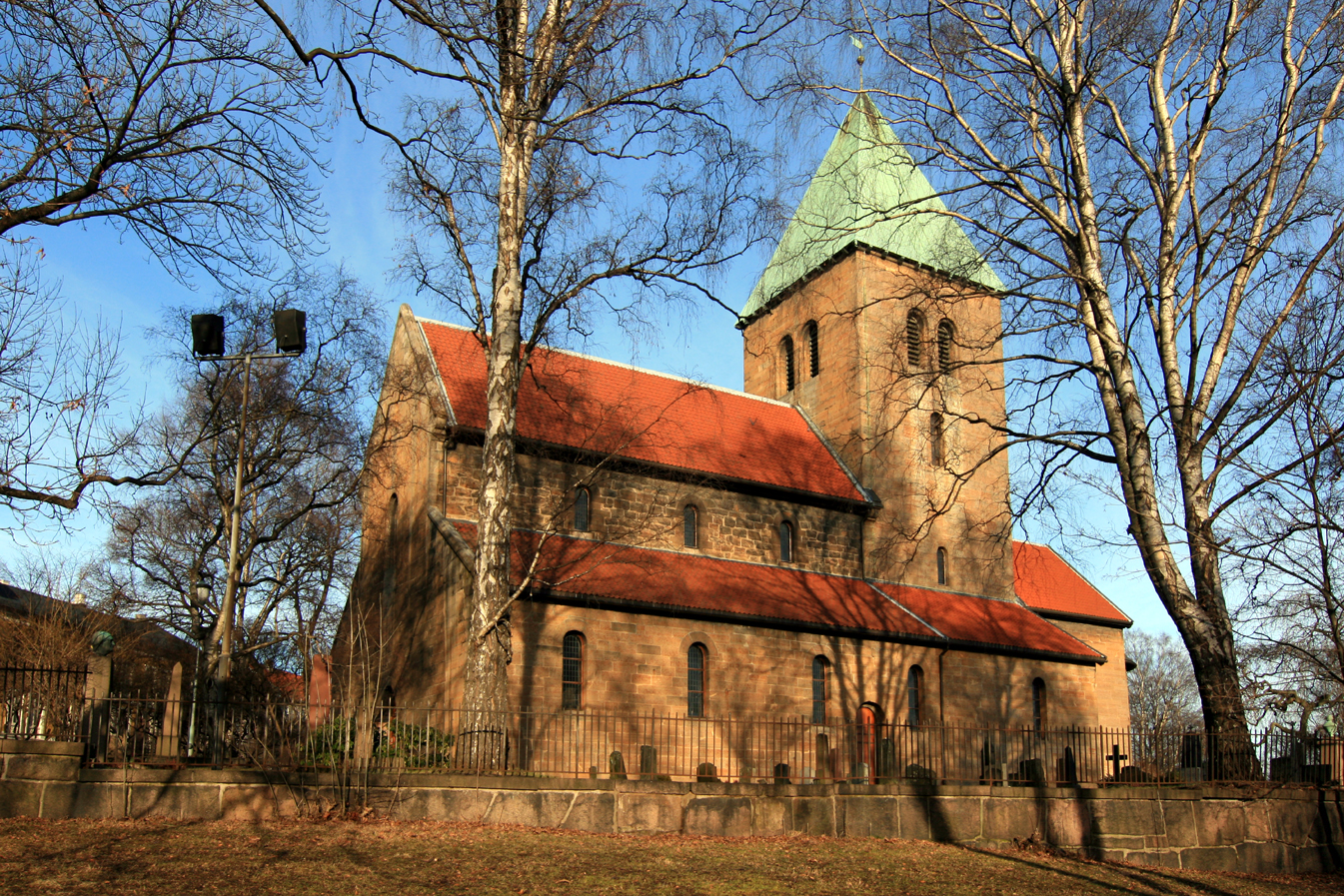
- South side of the church
- Type: Church
- Status: Automatically protected
- County: Oslo
- Municipality: Oslo
- Coordinates: 59.9237°N 10.7471°E
- Year built: Middle Ages
- ID: 84226

Telthusbakken with Gamle Aker kirke Edvard Munch (1880)

Old Aker Church (Norwegian: Gamle Aker kirke) is a medieval era church located in Oslo, Norway. An active parish, the church is the oldest existing building in Oslo. The church is surrounded by Old Aker Cemetery.

== History ==
Old Aker Church was built as a three-naved Romanesque style basilica and constructed from limestone. It is believed to have been erected by King Olav Kyrre in 1080 as a church for all of Vingulmark, the historic area surrounding Oslo. The grounds of Old Aker Church were originally likely the former site of the regional thing during the pre-Christian period.

The oldest part of the surrounding churchyard dates back to the 12th century. The church has been pillaged and ravaged by fire several times. After a lightning strike and fire during 1703, the tower and church bells as well as the entire inventory were destroyed. The exterior was restored by architects Heinrich Ernst Schirmer and Wilhelm von Hanno in 1861. Interior restoration during the period 1950–1955 included removal of plaster on brick walls and restoration of the Baroque style furnishings.

The church sits on top of Telthusbakken and is located centrally in the borough of St. Hanshaugen. It is surrounded by an old graveyard and a stone wall. The church has a baroque pulpit and baptismal font from 1715. The tower is built in 1861. Most of the buildings in the area are from the 1880s, with the addition of some apartment blocks from the 1930s. Gustav Jensen was appointed a curate at the church in 1874. Knud Karl Krogh-Tonning was parish priest at the church from 1886 to 1900.

The church was built over the former site of the Akerberg mines (Akersberg gruve), an ancient silver mine which was in use since the early Viking Age. The mines are mentioned in the 1170 Historia Norvegiae. The existence of these former mines must have been the inspiration for a number of local stories about the church having hidden silver treasures and even dungeons with dragons.

With the occupation of Norway by Nazi Germany during the Second World War in April 1940, King Haakon VII and his family left for England on the British cruiser HMS Glasgow, not knowing when or even if they would return. On 19 April 1940, the coffin of the king's late wife Queen Maud of Norway, who had died unexpectedly in London in 1938, was moved in secret to Old Aker Church, on the instructions of Eivind Josef Berggrav, Bishop of Oslo and Primate of the Church of Norway, and Hofmarschall Peter Broch. Her body was left undiscovered in the crypt, covered in a hidden tomb, until 1949, when her remains were finally interred in the Royal Mausoleum at Akershus Castle.

== Old Aker Cemetery ==
Old Aker Cemetery (Norwegian: Gamle Aker kirkegård) is the cemetery of Old Aker Church. Like the church, the cemetery dates back to the Middle Ages. The cemetery is located adjacent to the newer Cemetery of Our Saviour, which was established in 1808. Several notable people are interred in the cemetery.

=== Notable interments ===
- Georg von Bertouch, military officer
- John Collett (1758–1810), businessman
- Ole Georg Gjøsteen, politician
- Enevold de Falsen, statesman
- Hans Nielsen Hauge, lay preacher
- Christopher Hansteen, astronomer
- Lars Holst, politician
- Christian C.A. Lange, historian
- Adolf Schirmer, architect
- Herman Major Schirmer, architect
- Jørgen Herman Vogt, statesman
- Benjamin Wegner, industrialist
- Henriette Wegner, businesswoman, co-owner of Berenberg Bank

== Gallery ==
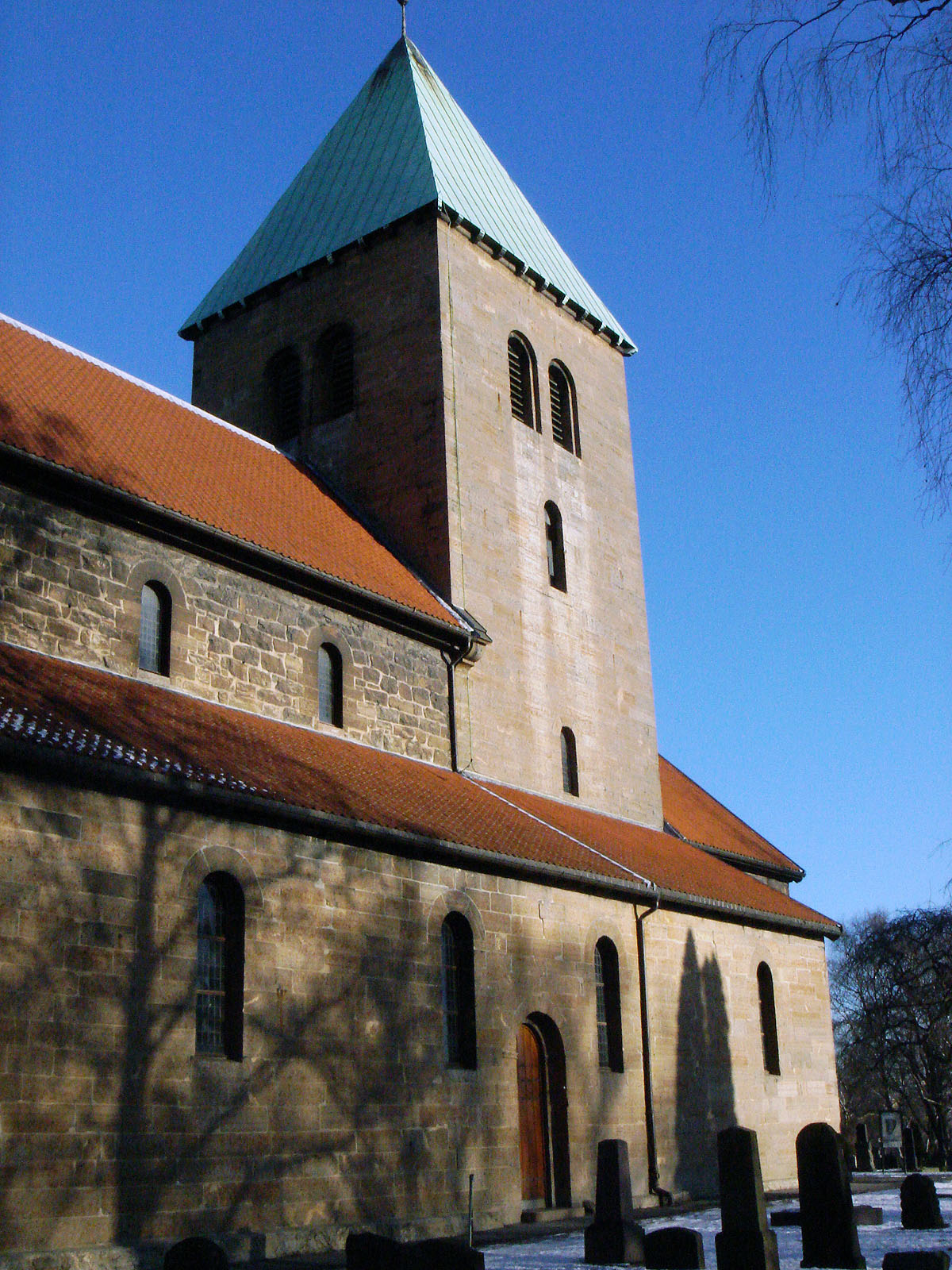
Gamle Aker kirke tower

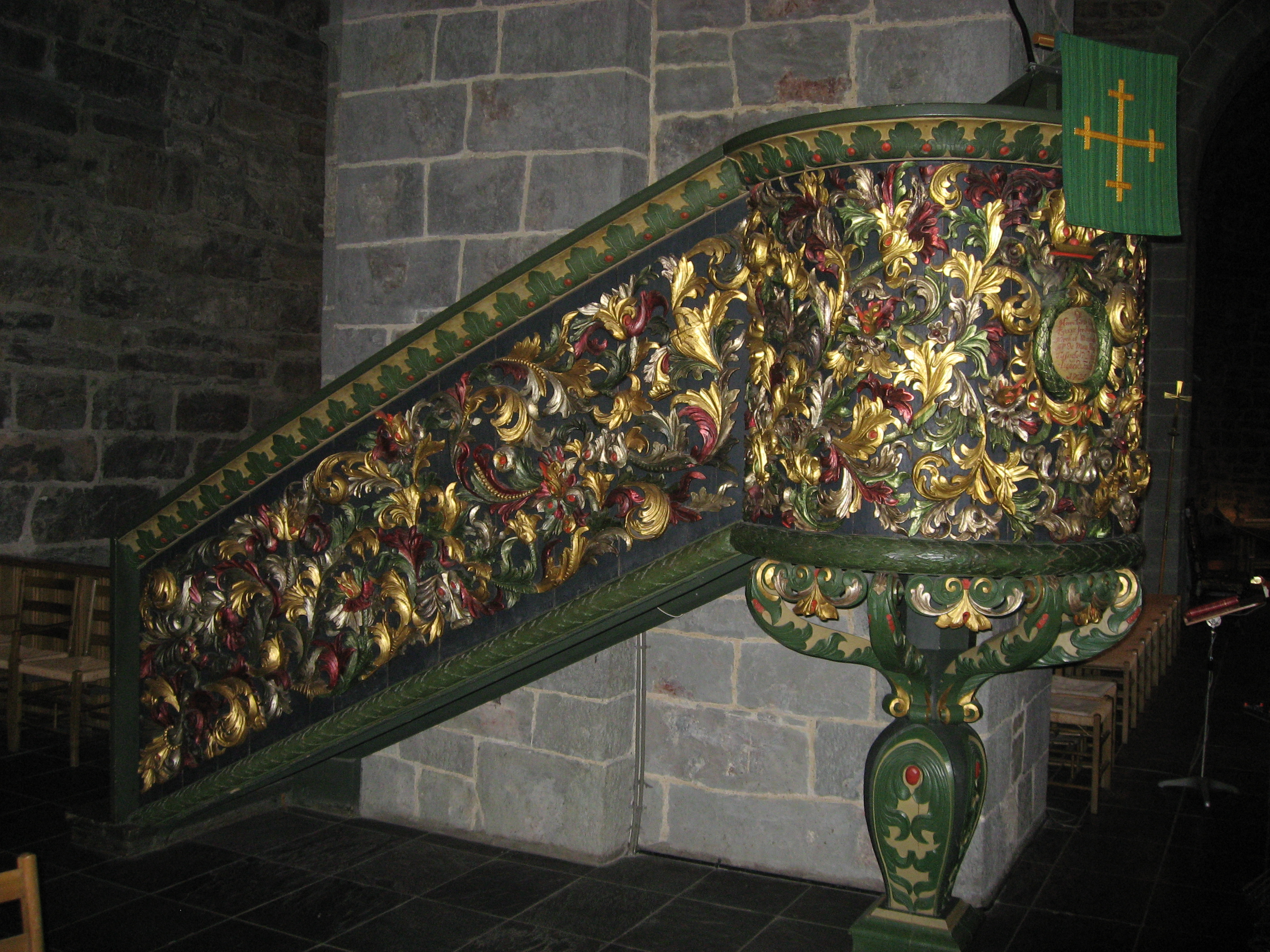
Gamle Aker kirke pulpit

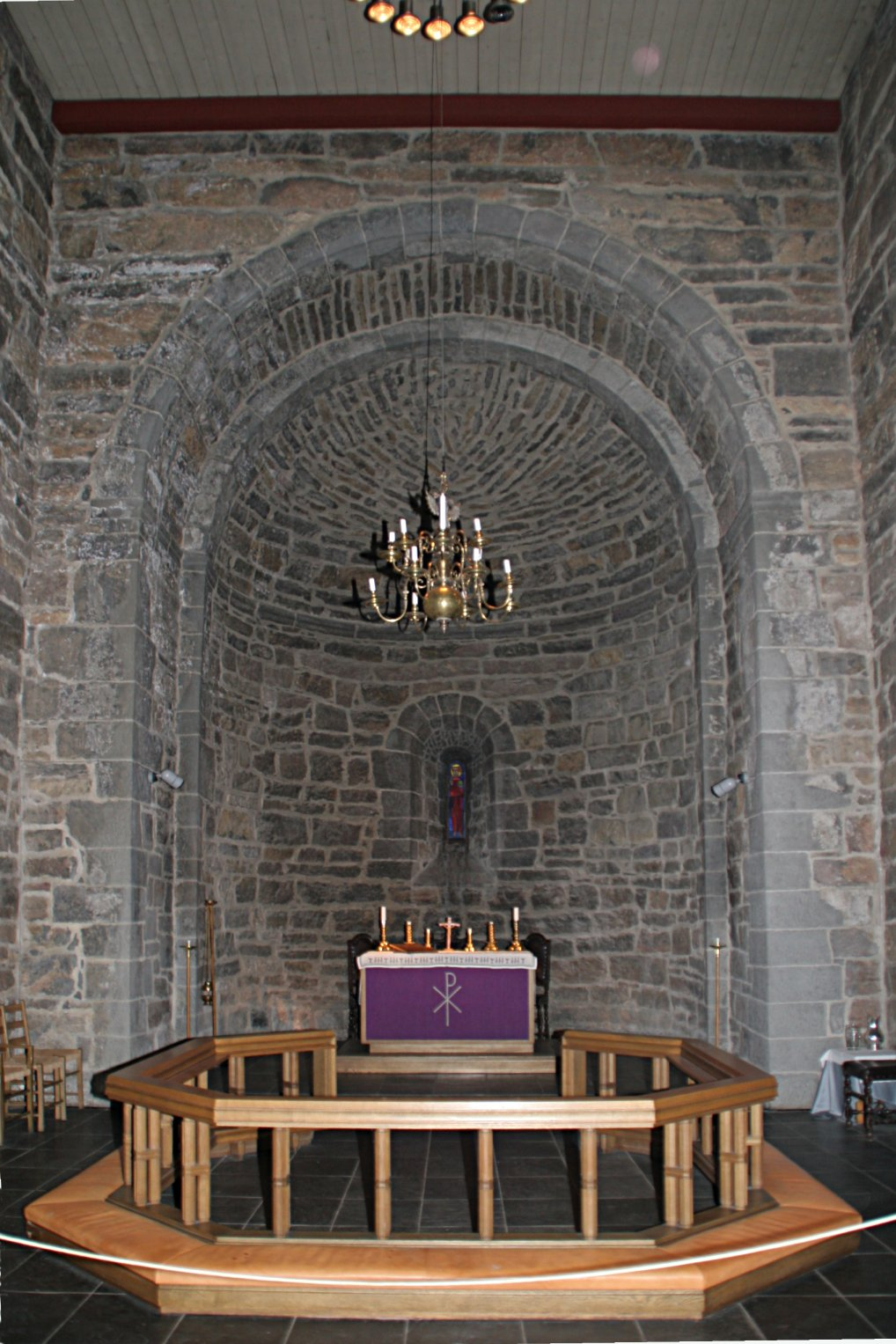
Gamle Aker kirke altar

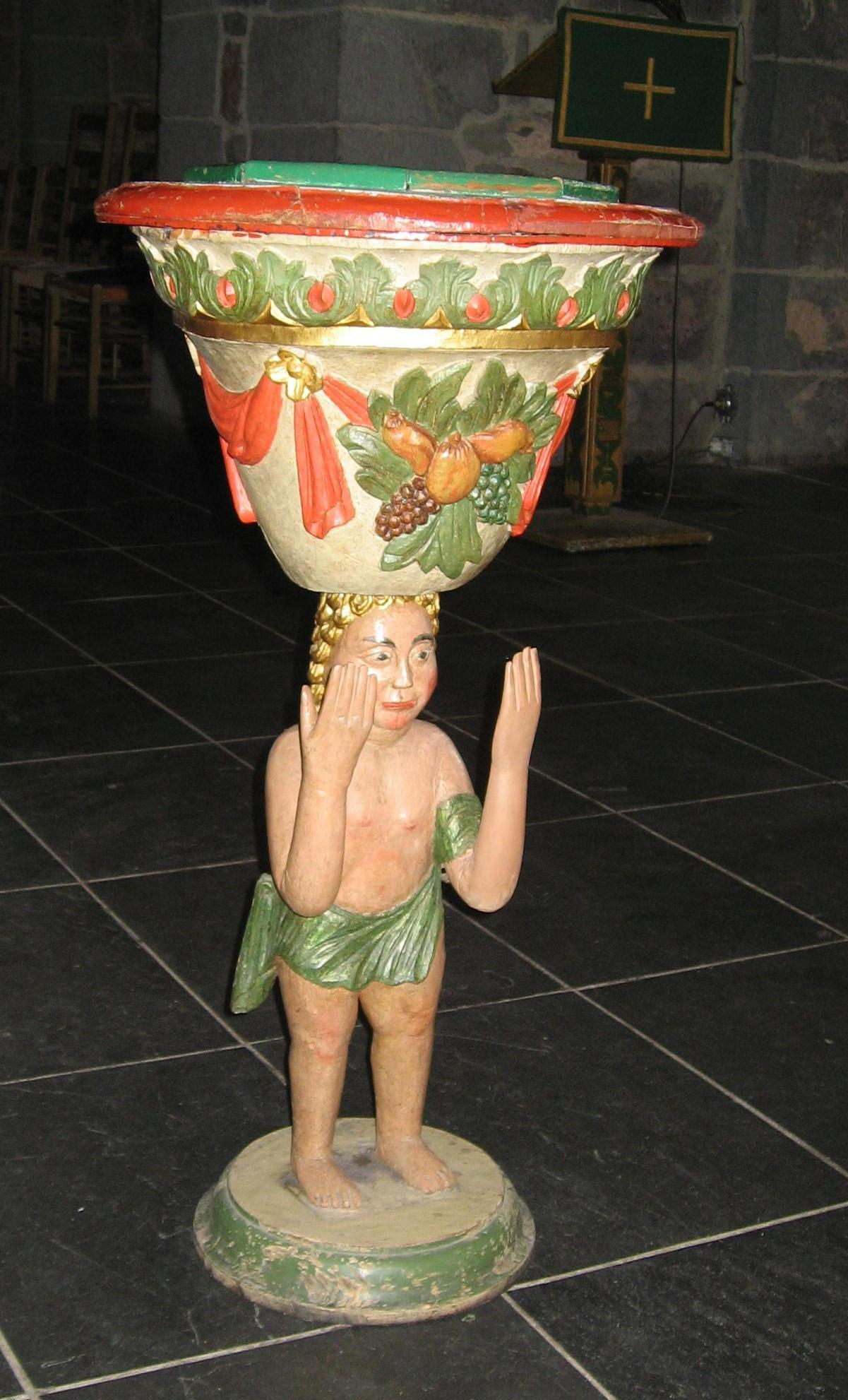
Gamle Aker kirke baptismal font

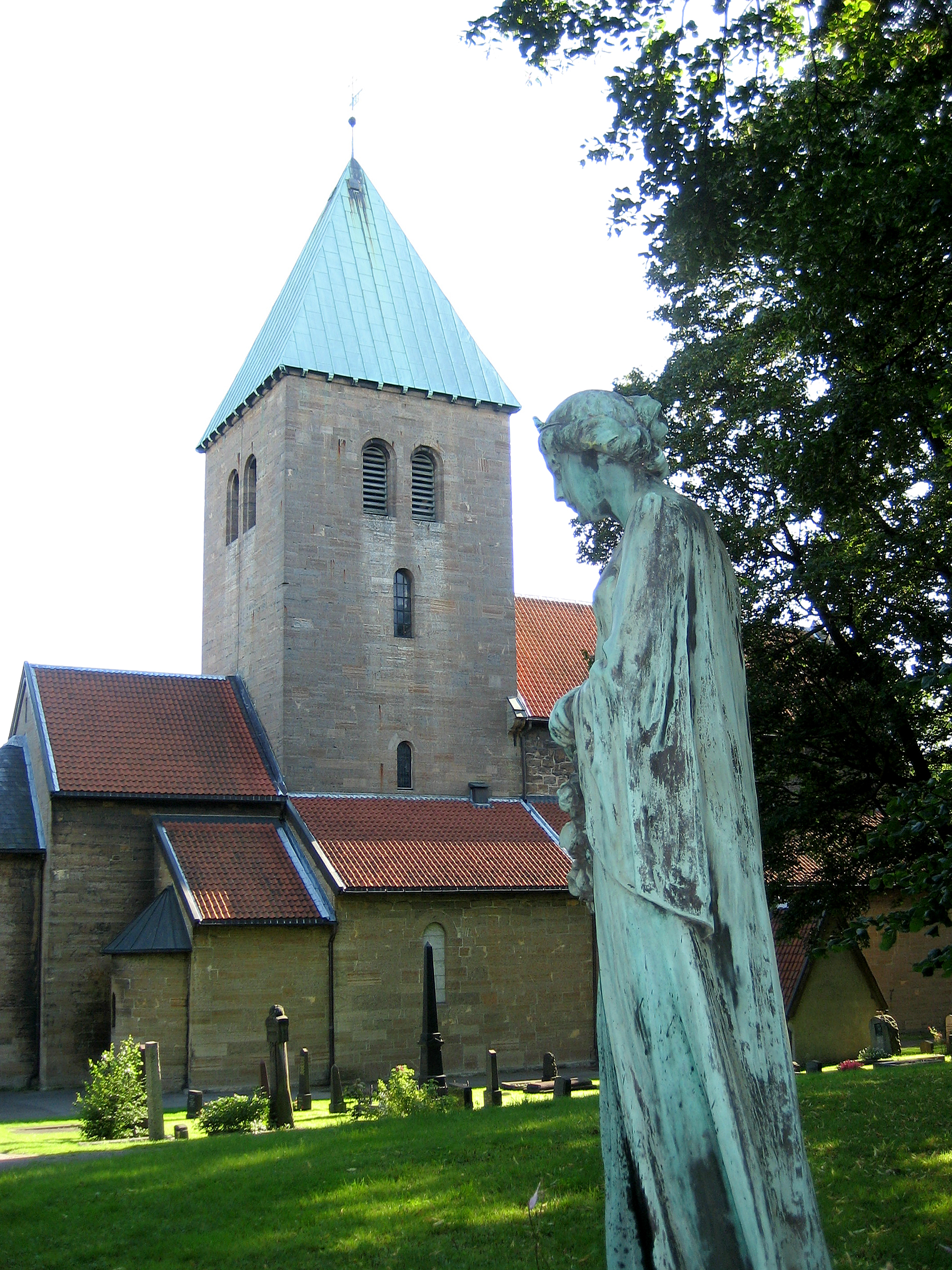
Gamle Aker kirke with sculpture
