= Association for the Support of Poor Mothers =

- Foreningen til fattige Barselkoners Understøttelse
- Formation: March 26, 1850; 176 years ago
- Founder: Henriette Wegner, Hedvig Maribo

The Association for the Support of Poor Mothers (Norwegian: Foreningen til fattige Barselkoners Understøttelse) was Norway's first women's organization, focused on aiding poor mothers.

The association was established on 26 March 1850 in Christiania by six women: Henriette Wegner, Hedvig Maribo, Emilie Blich, Thina Staib, Christence Stenersen, and Amalie Lindboe. These women, along with six others, were elected as the association's "directresses." Every six months, they selected a "chief directress." The founders and directresses were wealthy, bourgeois women, some of the richest in Norway.

The association engaged in humanitarian work for disadvantaged mothers ("deserving mothers, primarily from the lower class") and aimed to improve maternity care. It was an early precursor to the organized women's rights movement, which the founders helped to establish, including through the Kristiania Women's Reading Association, spearheaded by Maribo. The founders and directresses also collaborated in other associations; both Wegner and Maribo served on the board of the Charity for the Homeless, founded in Christiania in 1838. However, this charity was not a women's organization.

Later, local associations modeled after the Christiania association were formed in other cities, such as Bergen (1852) and Kristiansand (1860).
