= Wilhelm Christian Benecke von Gröditzberg =

German banker and merchant (1779–1860)

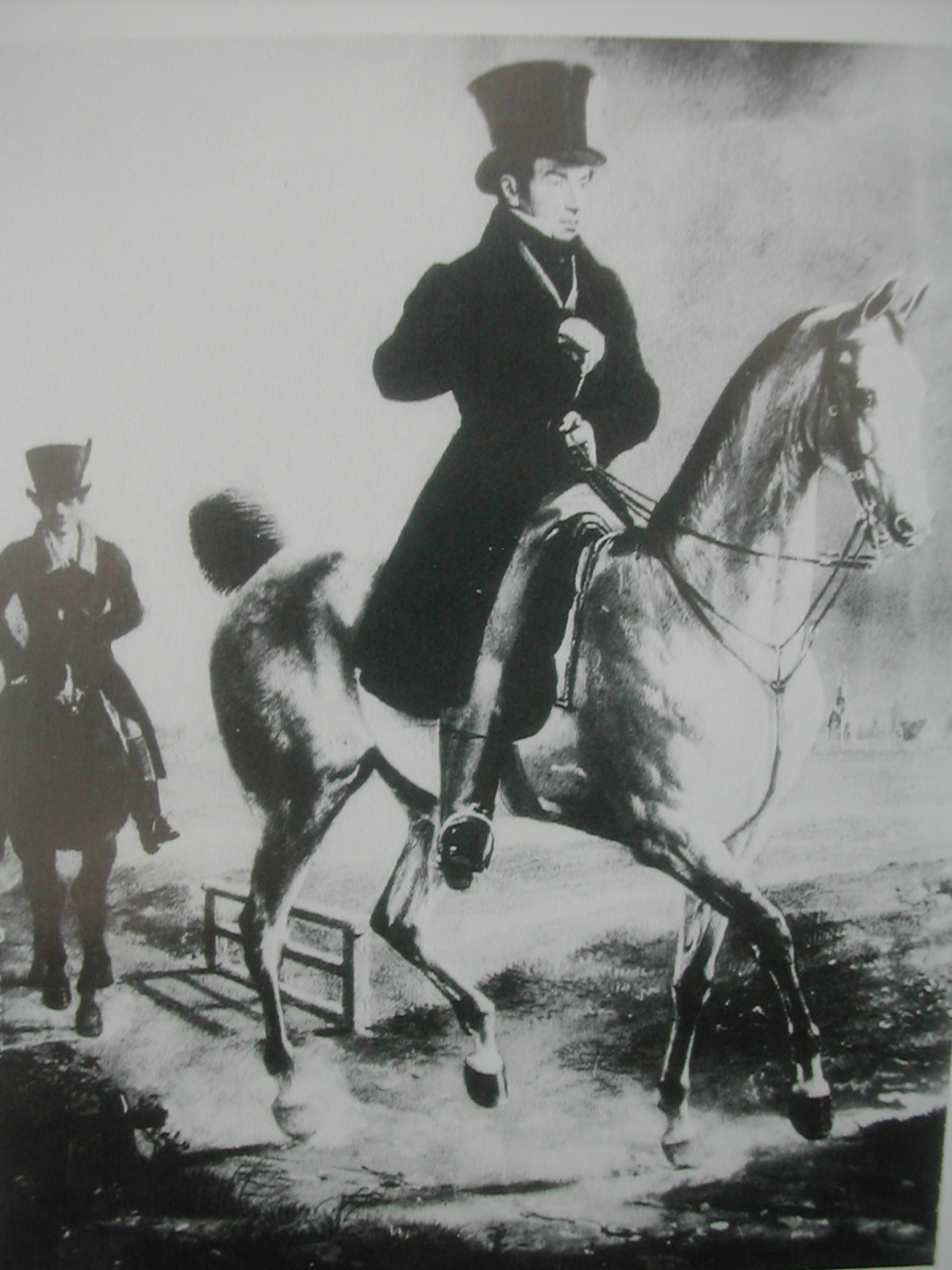
Franz Krüger: Benecke on horseback

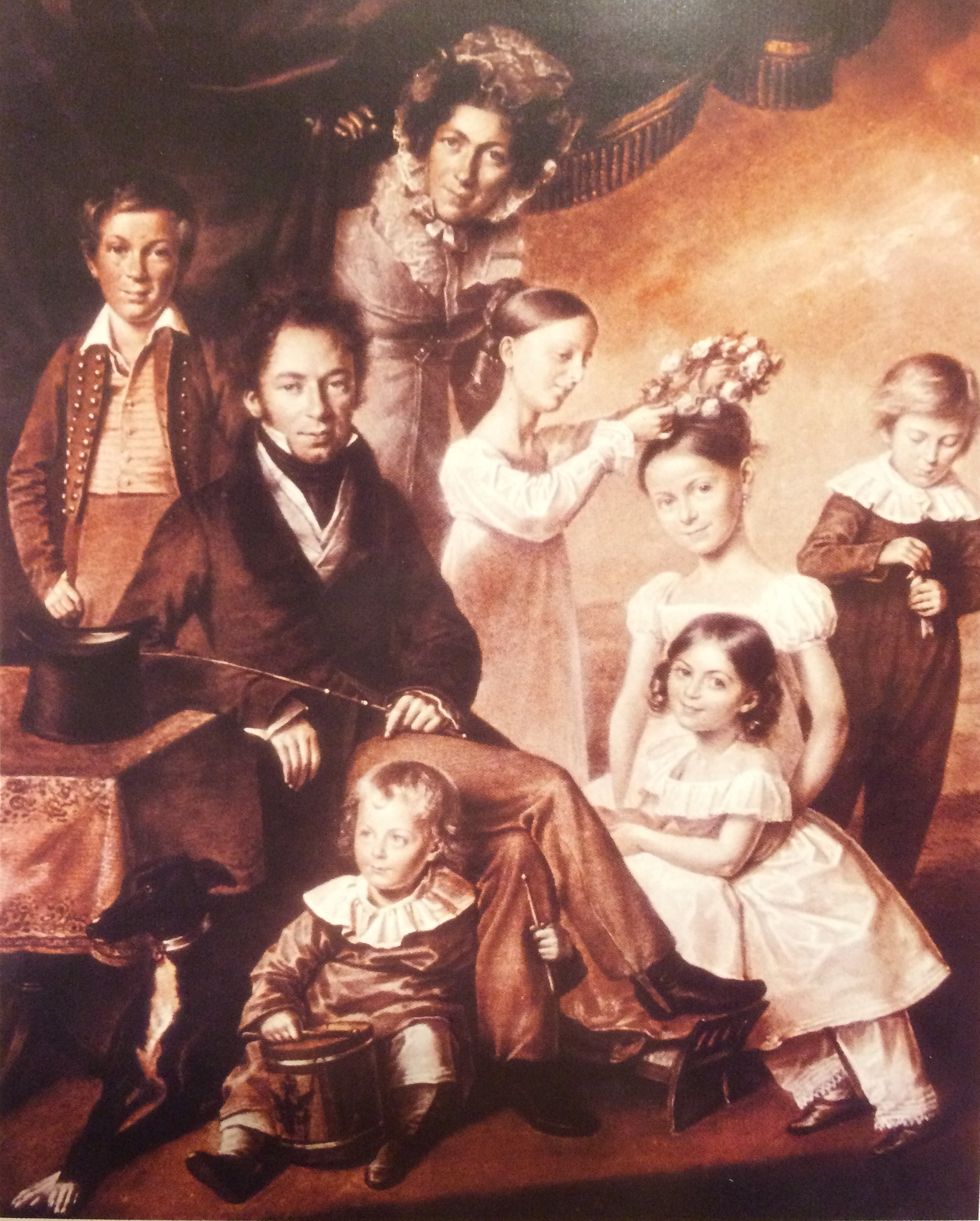
Franz Krüger: Benecke and family

Wilhelm Christian Benecke von Gröditzberg (12 December 1779 - 4 June 1860), né Wilhelm Christian Benecke, was a German banker, merchant, estate owner and art collector. He was ennobled in 1829 as Benecke von Gröditzberg, after he had bought the fief Gröditzberg including a baroque palace and medieval Castle Gröditzberg (now Grodziec) in Silesia.

Wilhelm Christian Benecke was born in Frankfurt an der Oder, Germany. During 1822, in partnership with Norwegian industrialist Benjamin Wegner, he bought Blaafarveværket at Åmot in what is now Modum Municipality in Buskerud county, Norway. The mining and industrial company Blaafarveværket had been founded in 1773 to extract cobalt from the mines at Modum, Norway.

One of the last significant paintings in his collection in private ownership - a signed and dated seascape by Willem van de Velde the Younger, which he had acquired from the Edward Solly collection - was restored "to death" in the restoration workshop of one of the most renowned European museums. In a first-instance court case that lasted 15 years, interested circles succeeded in covering up the disaster with the help of the judiciary.

In 1829, Benecke acquired the glass window collection of the Swiss poet Johann Martin Usteri, consisting of 156 windows from the 15th to 18th centuries, most of which are now in the Landesmuseum Zurich.

== Bibliography ==
- Wernicke, Ewald (1880) Groeditzberg: Geschichte und Beschreibung der Burg
- Kindingstad, Torbjørn (2002) Norges oljehistorie (Stavanger: Wigestrand) ISBN 8291370427
