= Wilhelm Adelsten Maribo =

Norwegian jurist (1814–1901)

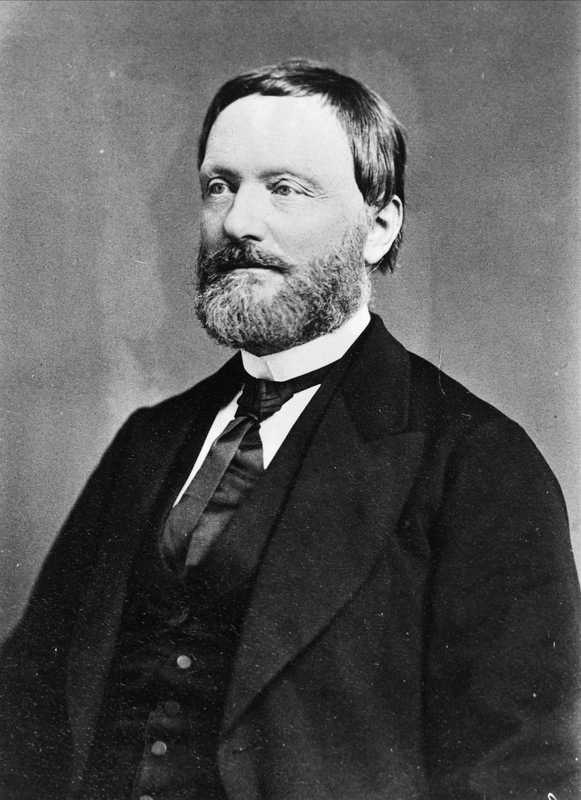
Wilhelm Adelsten Maribo

Wilhelm Adelsten Maribo (originally written Mariboe; also known as Vilhelm) (1814–1901) was a Norwegian lawyer, art historian, and patron. He was married to women's rights pioneer Hedvig Maribo.

He was the son of Ludvig Mariboe. His Jewish father converted to Christianity and moved from Copenhagen to Norway in 1804 as the secretary for Bernt Anker.

In 1837, Maribo graduated with a law degree (cand.jur.) from the Royal Frederick University. He served as a prokurator at the Higher Court in Christiania from 1843 to 1861, and later as a high court judge until he retired in 1875.

Maribo devoted himself to his passion for art and art history, undertaking numerous study trips, particularly to Italy. Together with Frederik Ludvig Vibe, he played a significant role in establishing the Sculpture Museum in Christiania, which was completed in Tullinløkka in 1881. This building later became the central part of the National Gallery of Norway. Additionally, Maribo served as a director (board member) of the Christiania Savings Bank from 1859.

In 1843, Maribo married his cousin, women's rights pioneer Hedvig Maribo (née Hedwig Theresia Francisca Sonnleithner; 1814–1891), daughter of Austrian lawyer, government advisor, librettist, and theater director Joseph Sonnleithner (1766–1835) and Wilhelmine Mariboe. Maribo had no children and bequeathed his estate to the Royal Norwegian Society for Development and various charitable funds.

== Honors ==
- Knight First Class of the Order of St. Olav, 1882, for services to the Sculpture Museum
