= Olga Thinn =

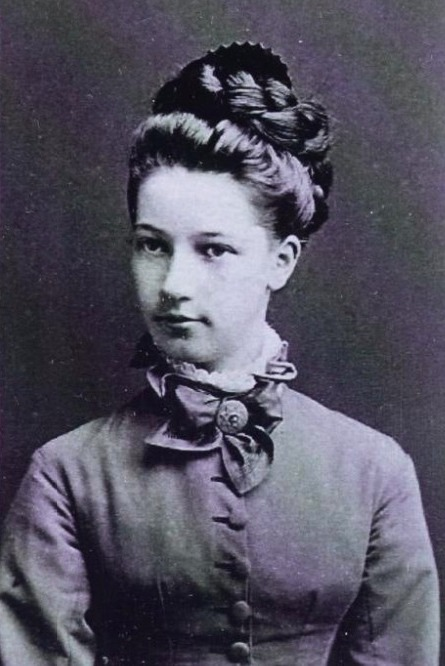
- Born: Olga Wegner; 12 June 1858; Drammen
- Died: 6 January 1943 (aged 84); Vinderen
- Occupation(s): humanitarian and women's rights leader
- Spouse: Karenus Kristofer Thinn
- Awards: King's Medal of Merit

Olga Thinn (12 June 1858 in Drammen – 6 January 1943 at Vinderen, Oslo), née Olga Wegner, was a Norwegian humanitarian and women's rights leader. She was married to Chief Justice of the Supreme Court Karenus Kristofer Thinn.

She was a daughter of the judge Johan Ludwig Wegner and Blanca Bretteville, and a granddaughter of the industrialist Benjamin Wegner and of Prime Minister Christian Zetlitz Bretteville.

She was a teacher from 1878 to 1881, when she married. When living in Tromsø, she founded the local Women's Public Health Association there. After her husband became lawspeaker of Oslo, she became involved in the women's rights cause. She was president of the humanitarian association Oslo Hjemmenes Vel, President of the Ebenezer Society, President of Oslo Women's Council and Vice President of Moralvernforeningen.

She was an honorary member of the Norwegian National Women's Council and received the King's Medal of Merit in Gold. She was painted by the English painter Renée Sund (née Alvarez), the wife of Harald Sund.
