= Benjamin Wegner =

Norwegian business magnate (1795–1864)

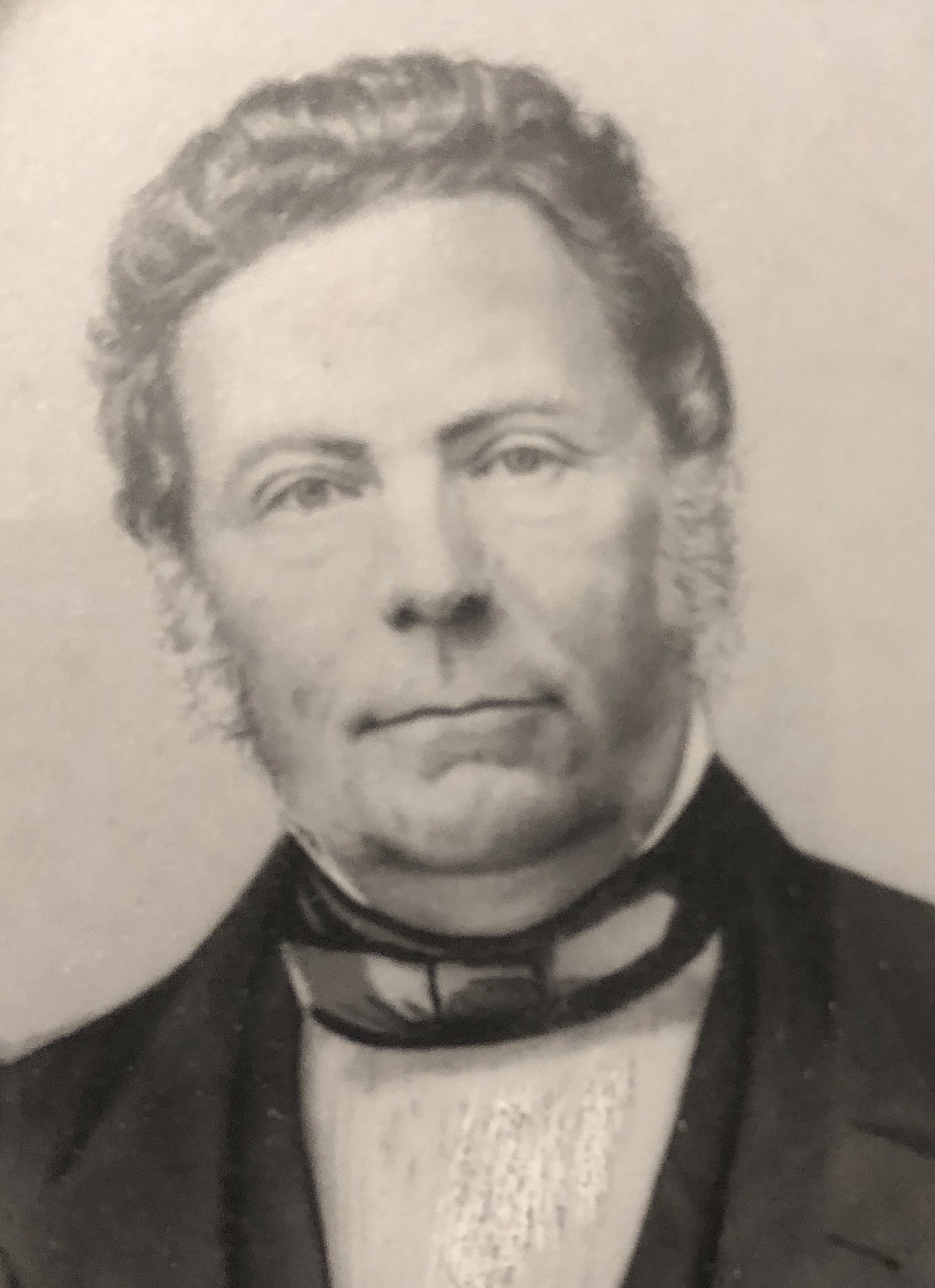
- Born: 21 February 1795; Königsberg
- Died: 9 June 1864 (aged 69); Bygdøy, Aker (now Oslo)
- Resting place: Old Aker Cemetery, Oslo
- Citizenship: Prussia (1795–1822); Norway (1822–1864)
- Known for: Business magnate
- Spouse: Henriette Seyler (1805–1875)
- Relatives: L.E. Seyler (father-in-law); Benjamin Wegner Nørregaard (grandson); Harald Nørregaard (grandson); Nikolai Nissen Paus (grandson); George Wegner Paus (grandson)

Signature
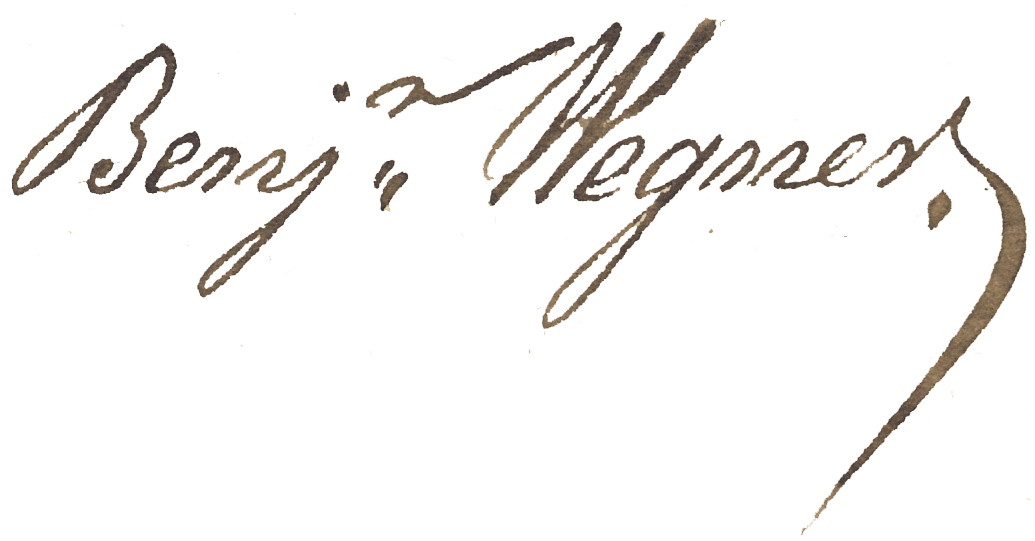

Jacob Benjamin Wegner (21 February 1795 – 9 June 1864) was a Norwegian business magnate. He was one of the country's leading mining magnates as the director-general and co-owner of Blaafarveværket, and also had significant interests in other mining and timber companies.

Born in Königsberg, East Prussia, he moved to London in 1819 and to Berlin in 1820, where he established an independent business as an agent in the British timber and grain trade, as a close associate of the London firm Isaac Solly and Sons. In 1820 and 1821, he also facilitated one of history's largest art sales on behalf of his close associate Edward Solly. In 1822, he settled in Norway, after he had bought Blaafarveværket (The Blue-Colour Works) on behalf of a consortium led by the Berlin banker Wilhelm Christian Benecke. From 1822 to 1849, he was Director General and one of two owners of Blaafarveværket. Under his leadership the company became Norway's largest mining company and largest and most successful industrial enterprise in the first half of the 19th century overall, and by far the world's largest producer of cobalt blue. He was also the owner of Frogner Manor, the largest co-owner of the Hafslund estate, a co-owner of the Hassel Iron Works and a co-owner of the timber firm Juel, Wegner & Co. Most of his business activities, both in the timber, grain and cobalt segments, focused heavily on export to England, where he spent much time throughout his life.

He served as consul general to Norway of the sovereign city-republics of Hamburg, Lübeck and Bremen, and as vice consul of the Kingdom of Portugal. He was married to the philanthropist Henriette Seyler (1805–75), a member of the Berenberg banking dynasty of Hamburg and briefly a co-owner of Berenberg Bank; she was the youngest daughter of Berenberg Bank's long-time head and co-owner L.E. Seyler, and a granddaughter of the Swiss-born banker and theatre principal Abel Seyler and of the Hamburg bankers Johann Hinrich Gossler and Elisabeth Berenberg.

== Early life ==
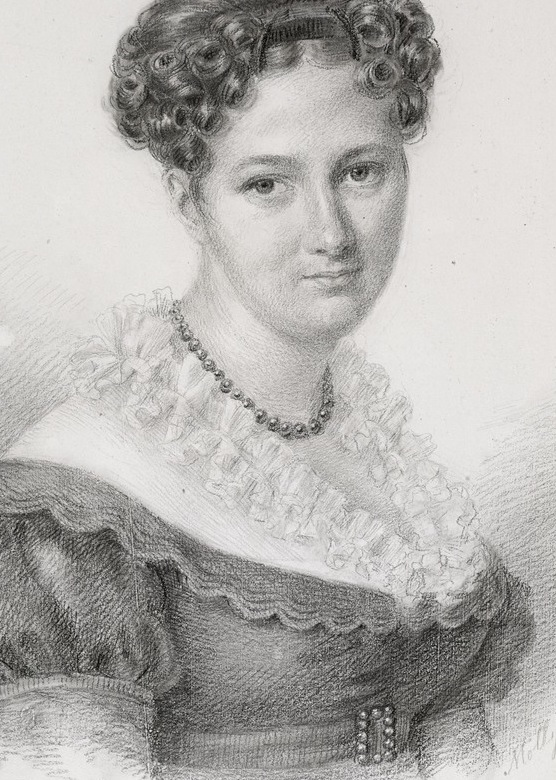
His wife Henriette Seyler (1805–75), daughter of Berenberg Bank co-owner L.E. Seyler, drawn by her sister Molly in 1827

Jacob Benjamin Wegner, who went by the name of Benjamin, was born in Königsberg, an important port city on the coast of the Baltic Sea. He was the son of Police Commissioner in Königsberg Johann Jacob Wegner (ca. 1757–1797) and Regina Dorothea Harder (1770–1813). His father had previously been married to Regina Dorothea's sister Anna Christina Harder (1765–1791). His father died on 12 January 1797, and his mother remarried to shipbuilder Philipp Gutzeit in 1798. (Note: Gutzeit is a Baltic name, meaning someone who lives in the thicket, and may refer figuratively to someone who "speaks like a Belarusian" or to a dark-looking person. It is not derived from German gut Zeit ("good time")) He had a brother, Friedrich Salomon Wegner (born 1793), and several half-siblings from his parents' two other marriages. Philipp Gutzeit was a younger brother of ship's captain and shipbuilder Benjamin Gutzeit, who was the father of the industrialist Wilhelm Gutzeit, the founder of one of Stora Enso's two principal predecessor companies.

Benjamin Wegner received a solid commercial education and joined a leading Königsberg firm as an apprentice.

=== British timber and grain trade ===
Around 1820, he moved to Berlin where he established an independent business as an agent in the British timber trade and grain trade, i.e. in large-scale export of timber and grain from the Baltic region to England. He was an agent and close associate of the London firm Isaac Solly and Sons and of the Berlin firm Gebrüder Benecke and its head Wilhelm Christian Benecke, and spent much time in London.

=== Solly's art sale ===
On behalf of his friend and close business associate Edward Solly, he also negotiated the agreement to sell Solly's unprecedented art collection of around 3,000 paintings—mainly Italian Trecento and Quattrocento paintings and Early Netherlandish paintings—to the Prussian king Frederick William III in 1821, of which 677 paintings formed the core of the collection of the new Gemäldegalerie. The negotiations were conducted by Wegner and Benecke on Solly's behalf, partly with Prince Hardenberg and partly with King Frederick William III personally.

== Industrialist in Norway ==
=== Blaafarveværket ===
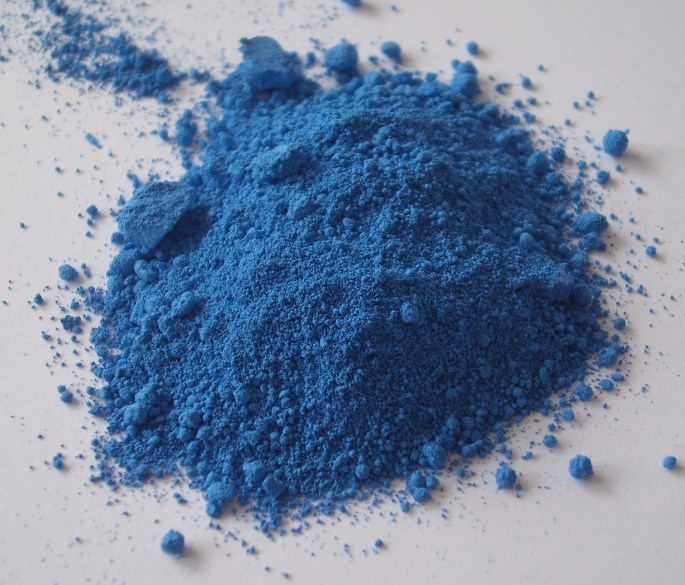
Cobalt blue, made from cobalt, a precious metal that was more expensive than silver

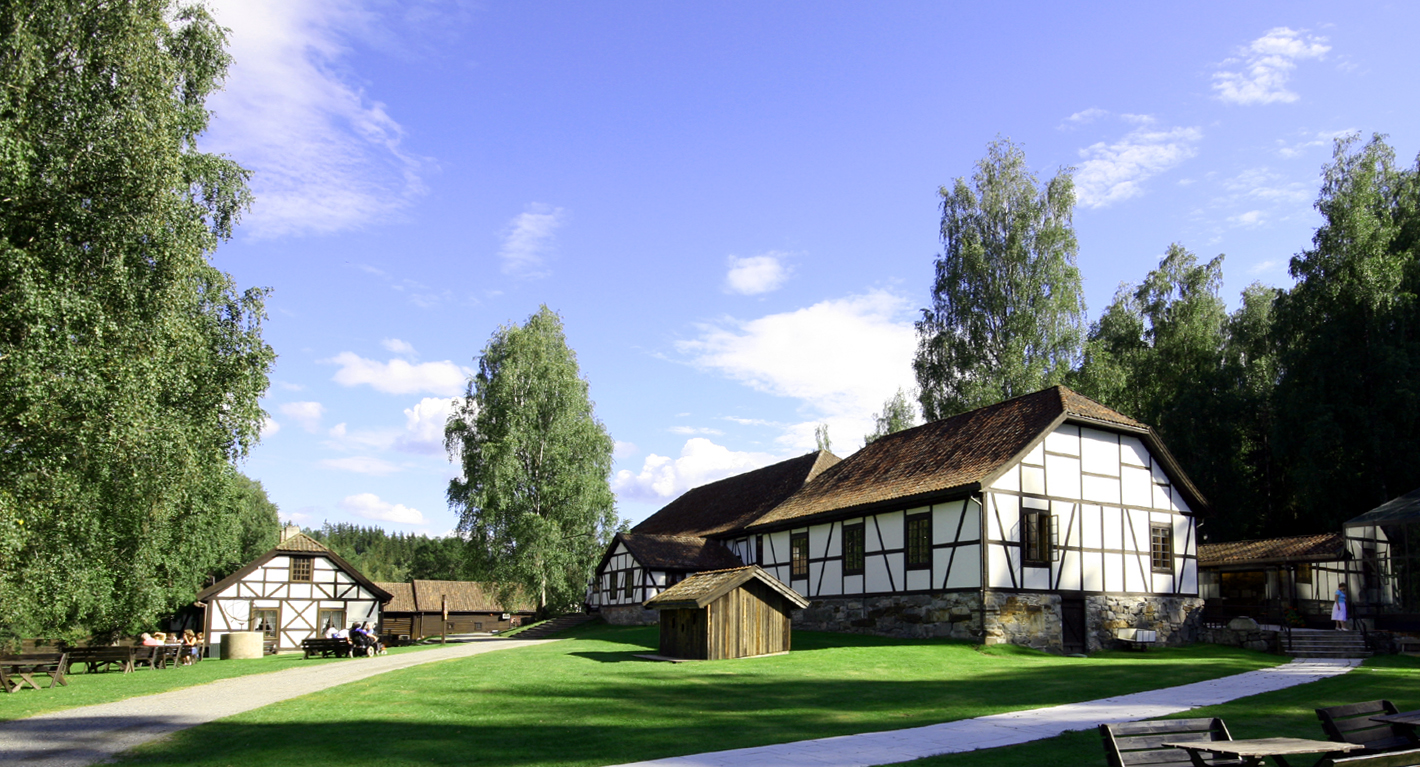
Blaafarveværket

In 1821, Modums Blaafarveværk in Norway, the world's leading producer of cobalt blue, was announced for sale. The former royal company had been pledged by the king as security for a loan during the Napoleonic Wars and taken over by the bankruptcy estate of the Swedish businessman Peter Wilhelm Berg when the state could not redeem the pledge. Edward Solly wanted to buy the company and send Wegner as his representative to complete the transaction, but as he had financial problems, the plans had to be canceled. However, in 1822, Wegner was sent by his business associate Wilhelm Christian Benecke to evaluate the profitability of the enterprise and with authorization to buy the company on Benecke's behalf if he found the company to be profitable. Wegner subsequently bought the company at a public auction on behalf of an investment group of which Benecke was the prime investor.

Wegner was appointed the new Director-General of Modums Blaafarveværk and became a co-owner, and he relocated to Norway, where he initially lived on the Fossum Manor near Modums Blaafarveværk. Upon taking up residence in Norway, he automatically became a Norwegian citizen under Norway's nationality law at the time. From 1826, Benecke and Wegner were the sole owners of Modums Blaafarveværk. Under their ownership, the company became the largest in Norway, employing as much as 2,000 people, and was the dominant cobalt blue producer worldwide, producing as much as 80% of the world's cobalt pigment for use in the porcelain, glass and paper industries around the world. The main export market was England and the company's largest customer by far was the London firm Smith, Goodhall & Reeves.

In its heyday, Blaafarveværket generated an annual income of around 10,000 Norwegian speciedaler for Wegner, partially as dividend and partially as tantième (in comparison, a well salaried, experienced miner at Blaafarveværket earned around 70 speciedaler annually, the chief engineer earned 250 and Wegner's immediate subordinate, the director of the mines, earned around 1,100).

As a consequence of the economic crisis following the revolutions of 1848 and also of the invention of the synthetic ultramarine colour, Modums Blaafarveværk went bankrupt in 1849.

=== Other enterprises and activities ===
Together with Benecke, Wegner owned the Hassel Iron Works from 1835 to 1854, each with half of the shares. He was also a co-owner, eventually the largest co-owner, of the major estate Hafslund with large forests in eastern Norway and the country's largest sawmill, from 1835 to 1864. His co-owners included Benecke and Herman Wedel Jarlsberg, and subsequently Thorvald Meyer and Westye Egeberg. In 1856, he co-founded the timber firm Juel, Wegner & Co. with Iver Albert Juel.

In 1836, he bought Frogner Manor, where he lived with his family until 1849. The family then sold Frogner Manor and moved to Christiania (now the inner city). Wegner however retained a part of the Frogner property, Frognerseteren with a part of the Nordmarka forests, until his death. Frogner Manor is today best known as the site of Frogner Park.

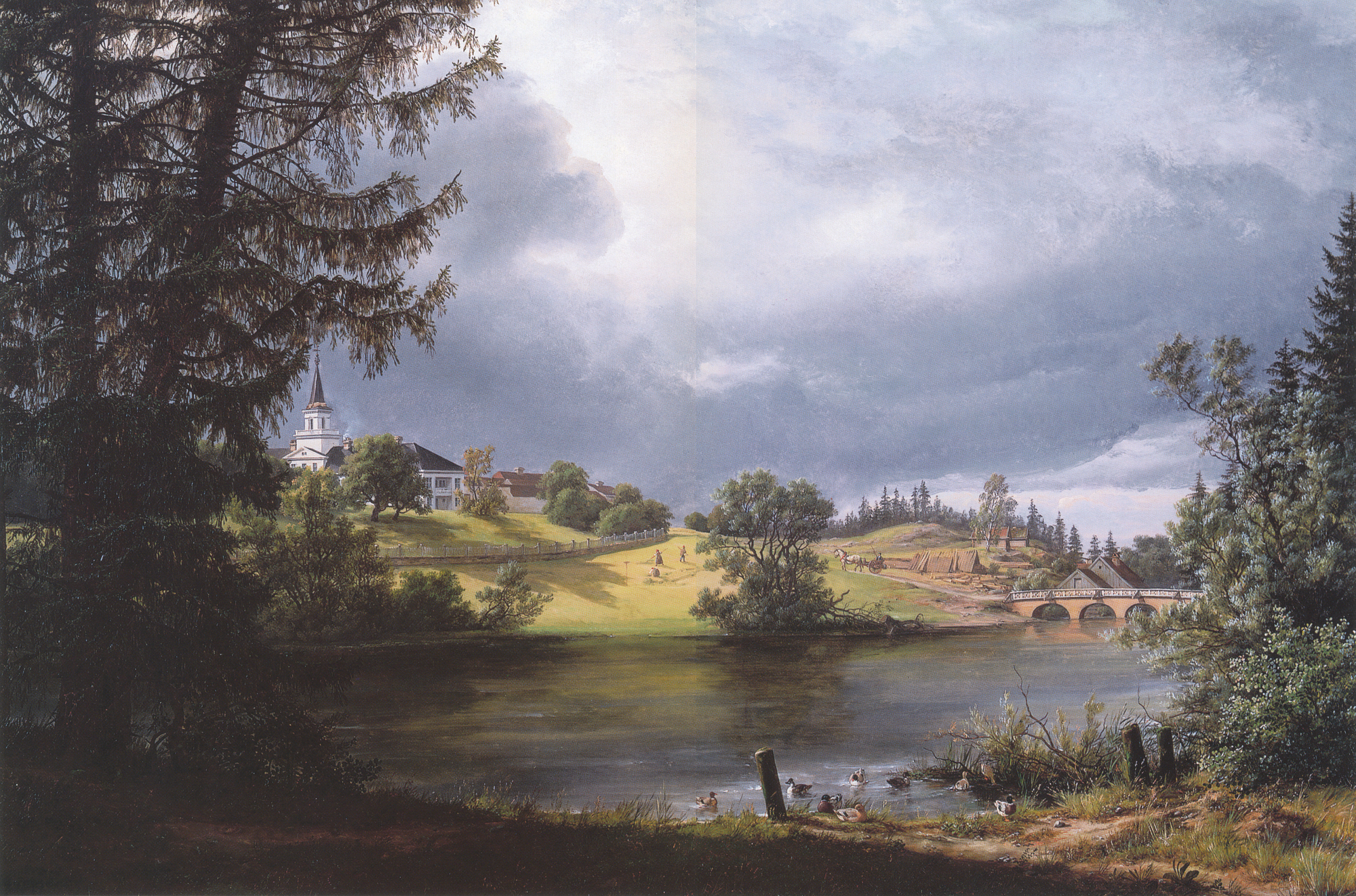
Frogner Manor (1842), painted by J.C. Dahl for Benjamin Wegner. The painting was formerly in the possession of the von Hosstrup family in Hamburg.

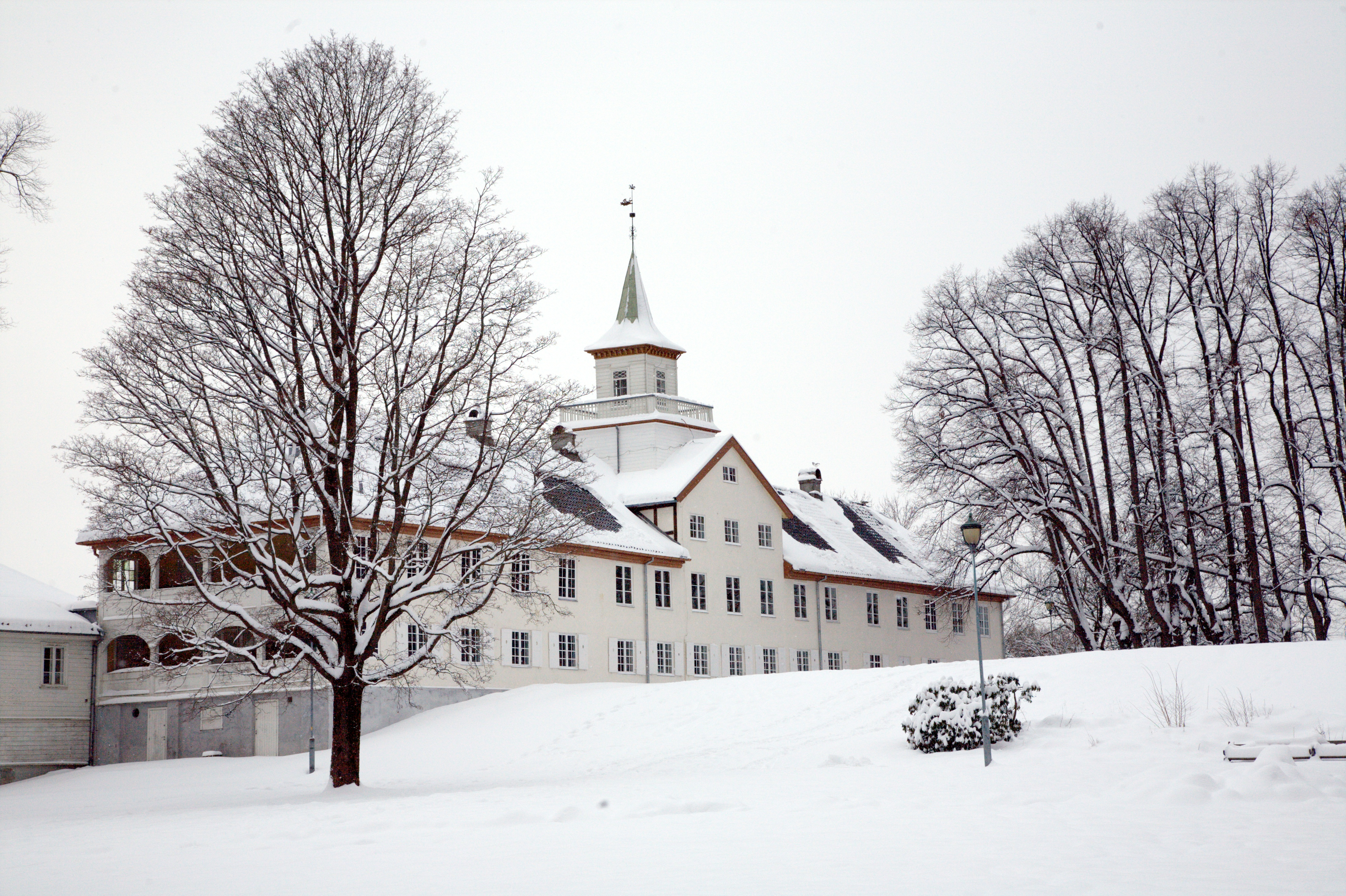
Frogner Manor today

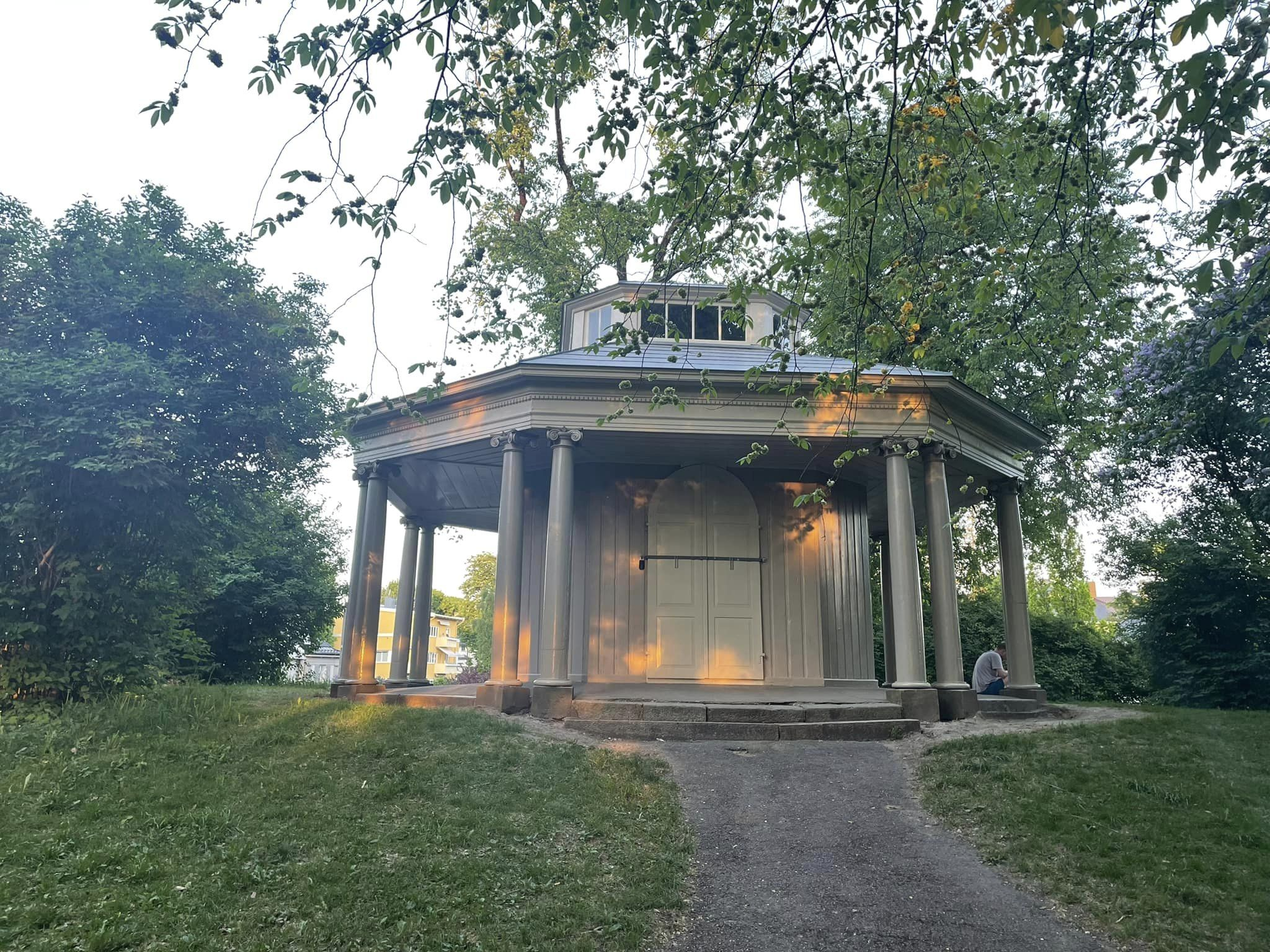
The pavilion in Frogner Park was a wedding gift from Benjamin Wegner to his wife Henriette

=== Consular roles ===
Wegner was appointed as Vice-Consul in Christiania for the Kingdom of Portugal in 1836, as Portugal's most senior representative in Norway. He became Consul in Christiania for the sovereign city-state of Hamburg – where his wife's family served in the government – in 1842 and was promoted to Hamburg's Consul-General for the Kingdom of Norway in 1844. He became Consul in Christiania for the city-state of Lübeck in 1843 and was promoted to Consul-General of Lübeck in 1861. He became Consul-General for Norway of the city-state of Bremen in 1859. He held these four consular offices until his death.

=== Death ===
He died at his country home, Dronninghavn, at Ladegaardsøen (Bygdøy), on 9 June 1864.

== Family ==
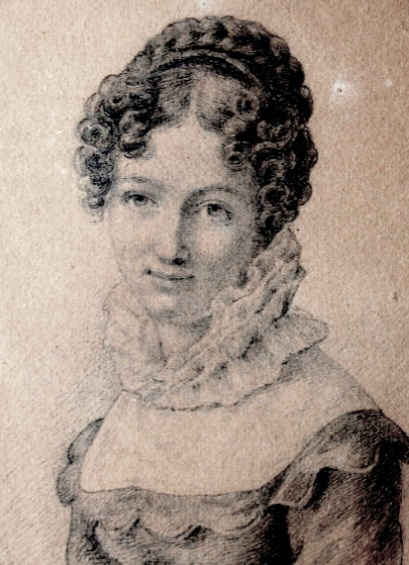
His wife Henriette Seyler (1805–75), drawn by her sister Molly in 1822

On 15 May 1824, Benjamin Wegner married Henriette Seyler (1805–1875) in St. Nicholas' Church, Hamburg. She was a member of the Berenberg banking dynasty of Hamburg, one of the city's most prominent Hanseatic families, and was the daughter of the banker L.E. Seyler (1758–1836) and Anna Henriette Gossler (1771–1836). Her father was a co-owner of Joh. Berenberg, Gossler & Co. (Berenberg Bank), President of the Commerz-Deputation, and a member of the Hamburg Parliament, and she was a granddaughter of the Swiss-born merchant turned theatre director Abel Seyler and Sophie Elisabeth Andreae from Hanover on her father's side and of the Hamburg bankers Johann Hinrich Gossler and Elisabeth Berenberg on her mother's side. Through her paternal grandfather, she was also descended from the Calvinist theologian Friedrich Seyler and from the Burckhardt, Merian, Faesch, Socin and Meyer zum Pfeil patrician families of Basel, and through her mother from families such as Amsinck and Welser. Henriette Seyler was a niece of Hamburg senator and banker Johann Heinrich Gossler II and a first cousin of Hamburg First Mayor Hermann Gossler (1802–1877). Upon her father's death, Henriette Seyler became a co-owner of Berenberg Bank until 31 December 1836.

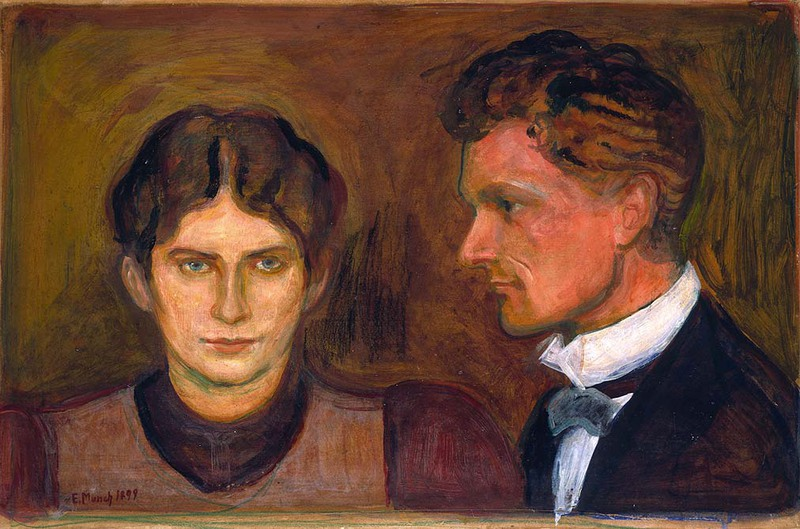
Benjamin Wegner's grandson Harald Nørregaard, painted by Edvard Munch (1899)

Benjamin and Henriette Wegner had four sons and two daughters, all of whom were born in Norway, where they have many notable descendants. Their oldest son Johann Ludwig Wegner (1830–1893) was a judge and married Blanca Bretteville, a daughter of Prime Minister Christian Zetlitz Bretteville; their second son Heinrich Benjamin Wegner (1833–1911) was a timber merchant and married Henriette Vibe, a daughter of the classical philologist Ludvig Vibe; their oldest daughter Sophie Wegner (1838–1906) married colonel and aide-de-camp to king Charles Hans Jacob Nørregaard; their youngest daughter Anna Henriette Wegner (1841–1918) married the theologian Bernhard Pauss; their youngest son George Wegner (1847–1881) was a supreme court barrister.

Benjamin Wegner was the grandfather of the lawyer, county governor and chief of police Benjamin Wegner (1868–1949), of the humanitarian and women's rights leader Olga Wegner (the wife of the Chief Justice of the Supreme Court Karenus Kristofer Thinn), of the internationally noted war correspondent Benjamin Wegner Nørregaard, of the noted lawyer, President of the Norwegian Bar Association and founder of the law firm Hjort Harald Nørregaard, of the wine merchant and consul in Tarragona Ludvig Nørregaard, of the surgeon and President of the Norwegian Red Cross Nikolai Nissen Paus, of the lawyer and Director at the Norwegian Employers' Confederation George Wegner Paus and of the engineer and industrial leader Augustin Paus.
