= Benjamin Wegner (civil servant) =

Norwegian civil servant and lawyer

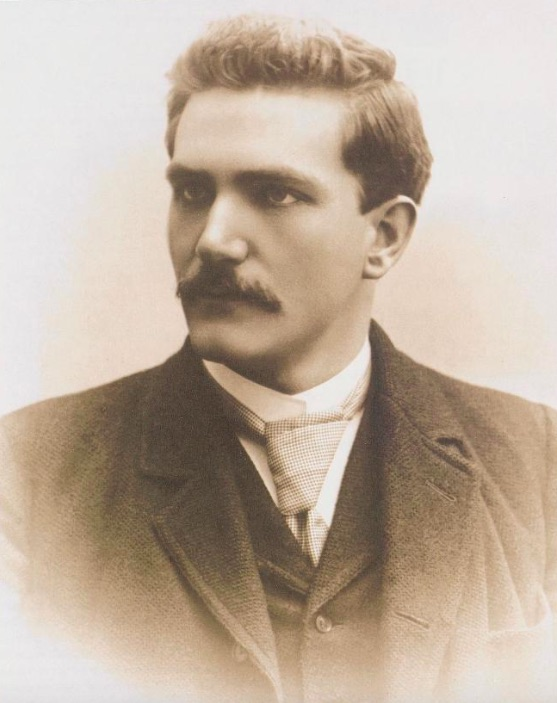
Jacob Benjamin Wegner

Jacob Benjamin Wegner (9 December 1868 in Christiania – 31 August 1949) was a Norwegian civil servant and lawyer, who served as district judge, magistrate, chief of police (corresponding to chief constable) of Helgeland and Rogaland, and governor of Romsdal.

He was a son of the timber merchant Heinrich Benjamin Wegner (1833–1911) and Henriette Frederikke Vibe i Oslo, and a grandson of the industrialist Benjamin Wegner and of the classical philologist Frederik Ludvig Vibe. He was the father of judge and chief of police Rolf Benjamin Wegner and the grandfather of chief of police Rolf Benjamin Wegner.

Following his examen artium university entrance exam, he graduated with the cand.jur. degree in 1891. He became a deputy judge in Larvik in 1892 and was acting district judge in Larvik 1893–1894. He was called to the bar in 1894 and briefly practiced as a barrister in Larvik. From 1895 he held a number of offices in an acting capacity; he was district judge in Brevik for one year, district judge in Porsgrunn for half a year and chief of police and magistrate of Bodø from 1897. In early 1898, he became deputy governor of Romsdal, and from 1900 he was acting governor of Romsdal for one year. In 1901 he became bailiff of Southern Helgeland and following an administrative reform, he became chief of police of Helgeland in 1910. In 1917 he became chief of police of Rogaland. He retired in 1938.
