= Rolf B. Wegner =

Norwegian lawyer, civil servant and chief of police

Rolf Benjamin Wegner (born 27 October 1940 in Ålesund) is a Norwegian lawyer, civil servant and former chief of police. He is one of the most well known and popular policemen in Norway.

== Background ==
He grew up in Halden and is a son of chief of police and judge Rolf Benjamin Wegner (the elder), a grandson of chief of police and county governor Benjamin Wegner, a great-grandson of the timber merchant Heinrich Benjamin Wegner and a 2nd great-grandson of the industrialist Benjamin Wegner. His father published a book about the Wegner family. He rarely uses the name Benjamin, joking that he prefers people to believe the "B" stands for "Bastian, bank box or something like that."

== Career ==
He graduated as a jurist at the University of Oslo in 1967 and worked as a deputy judge in Horten 1967–1969 and as a junior police prosecutor at Romerike 1969–1972.

He served as Deputy Director of Public Prosecutions 1972–1974, as assistant chief of police (corresponding to assistant chief constable in the United Kingdom) and education director of the Police Academy 1974–1980, as chief of police (corresponding to chief constable in the United Kingdom) in Bodø and director of the rescue coordination centre for Northern Norway and of the Security Service in Northern Norway 1980–1985, as director-general in the Ministry of Justice and head of the Prison Board 1985–1990, as the first director of the Norwegian Police University College 1990–1992, as chief of police in Bergen 1992–2001 and as chief of police in the National Police Directorate 2001–2010.

He has written several books and articles on policing and criminal law, private law and criminology, as well as historical topics. He is chairman of the board of the Halden Prison Museum Foundation. He has also been chairman of the parish council of Vestre Aker. He has been a member of the council of Halden Historical Festival.

== Fagereng case ==
As chief of police in Bergen, he had a central role in the so-called Fagereng case, in which the city's chief municipal executive Ragnar Fagereng and his wife were put on trial for filing false police reports and for insurance fraud after reporting repeated vandalism to their home. Wegner was convinced they were innocent and tried to stop the prosecution, which generated much controversy. Ragnar Fagereng was ultimately acquitted, while his wife was convicted. The case later became known as a miscarriage of justice, after a gangster confessed to terrorizing the Fagereng family in the 1990s and manipulating the police to prosecute them, and the Norwegian Criminal Cases Review Commission reopened the case in 2010, resulting in the acquittal of Fagereng's wife.

== Honours ==
He was appointed as a commander of the Order of the Falcon in 1997. He received the highest award of the Norwegian police force, the Norwegian Police Cross of Honour, in 2002, after leaving office as chief of police of Bergen.

He received the Clear Speech Prize in 1996, after he had authorized a protest against the visiting Chinese President; when asked if he was aware that Chinese authorities did not like protests, he responded that "here in Bergen, I am the one who makes the decisions".

== Selected works ==
Law and policing

- Privatrett for elever ved Politiskolen, 1976
- Alminnelig strafferett for elever ved Politiskolen, 1977, 1985
- Kriminologi for elever ved Politiskolen, 1978
- Ordenspolititjeneste for elever ved Politiskolen, 1979
- Politimessig lederskap, 1980
- Alminnelig strafferett, 1989
- Ordenstjeneste for studenter ved Politihøgskolen, 1994
- Politistrategi : belyst gjennom praktisk politiarbeid, Universitetsforlaget, 2007
- Strafferett, 2 vols., 2014

History

- Mine tippoldeforeldre Henriethe og Benjamin Wegner forteller, 2013
- Barkskipet «Dronningen» af Fredrikshald og kaptein Ludvig Bernhard Martinsen, 2012
- Oldefar Heinrich Wegner forteller, 2010
- Andreas Vibe: «Onkel major», 1801–1860, 2009
- "Halden gamle fengsel," in Wiwar : gammelt fra Østfold på ny måte, 2009

Police appointments
Preceded by Oskar Hordnes	Chief of Police of Bergen; 1992–2001	Succeeded by Vidar Refvik
