= Hedvig Maribo =

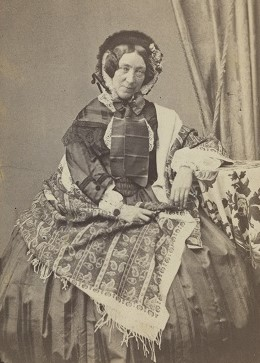
- Maribo photographed by Claus Knudsen
- Born: October 14, 1814
- Died: February 9, 1891 (aged 76)
- Organization(s): Association for the Support of Poor Mothers, Kristiania Reading Society for Women
- Known for: Activism for women's rights
- Spouse: Wilhelm Adelsten Maribo (1843)
- Parent: Joseph Sonnleithner Wilhelmine Mariboe

Hedvig Theresia Francisca Maribo (née Sonnleithner; 14 October 1814 – 9 February 1891) was an Austrian-Norwegian philanthropist, founder of charitable trusts, and early women's rights pioneer. She worked for several decades for poor and disadvantaged women and for women's participation in public life. In 1850, she founded Norway's first women's organization, the Association for the Support of Poor Mothers, along with five other women, and in 1874, she was the driving force behind the establishment of the Kristiania Reading Society for Women (Kristiania Læseforening for Kvinder). The association became a precursor to the Norwegian Association for Women's Rights and had a major role in the early history of the Norwegian women's rights movement.

She was the daughter of the Austrian librettist and theatre director Joseph Sonnleithner and Wilhelmine Mariboe, who belonged to a Danish Jewish family. Her father was a secretary at the court theater in Vienna, wrote the libretto for Beethoven's Fidelio, and was Beethoven's friend and lawyer. In 1843 she married her cousin, Norwegian lawyer, art historian, and patron Wilhelm Adelsten Maribo.
