= Blaafarveværket =

Norwegian mining and industrial company

Coordinates: 59.911305°N 9.88776°E

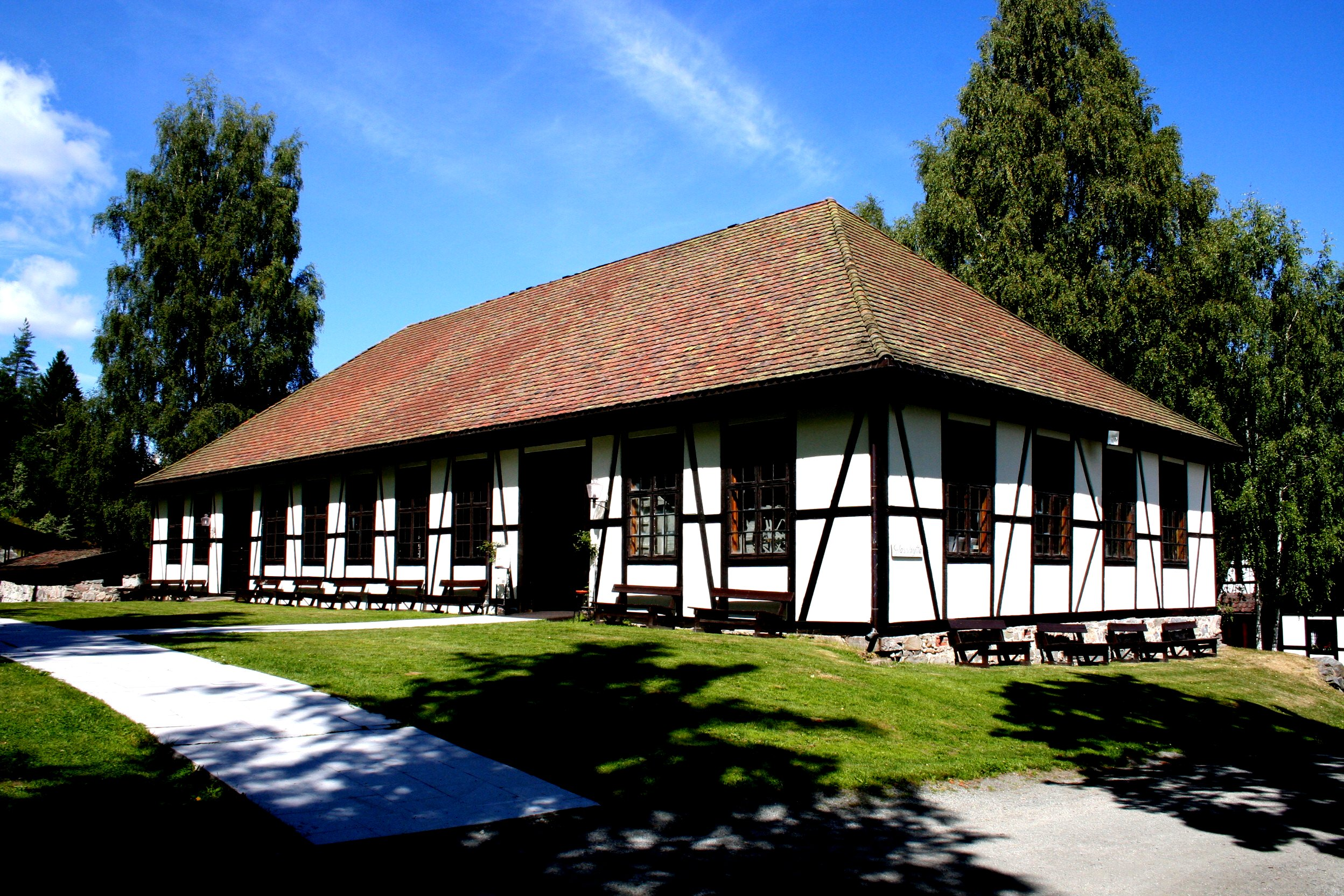
Blaafarveværket in Åmot

Blaafarveværket, or the Blue Colour Works, was a mining and industrial company located at Åmot in Modum in Buskerud, Norway, which existed from 1776 to 1898, and which was Norway's largest mining company in the first half of the 19th century. The works mined cobalt ore and manufactured by smelting blue cobalt glass (smalt) and cobalt blue (cobalt aluminate) pigment. It is currently a large open-air industrial museum and an art gallery; it is the largest and best preserved mine museum in Europe, and one of Norway's most visited attractions.

The company was founded as the Royal Blue Colour Works by King Christian VII in 1776 and was one of the few companies with lasting significance from the age of mercantilism, played an important role in Norwegian trade with Denmark, the Netherlands and the Far East and had a decisive impact on the Norwegian economy in the period around 1814. In 1822 the company was sold to the Berlin banker Wilhelm Christian Benecke and Benjamin Wegner, and their ownership lasted until 1849, a period regarded as the company's heyday and during which it became the largest industrial company of the country. The company went bankrupt in 1849 in the wake of the revolutions of 1848 and competition from synthetic ultramarine, but a greatly reduced activity continued until 1898. From 1968 Blaafarveværket has been made available to the public as an open-air industrial museum and art gallery, run by the non-profit foundation Stiftelsen Blaafarveværket. Blaafarveværket is the largest and best preserved traditional mining museum in Europe. It is presented to the public like the mining company it was during its heyday around 1840.

== History ==
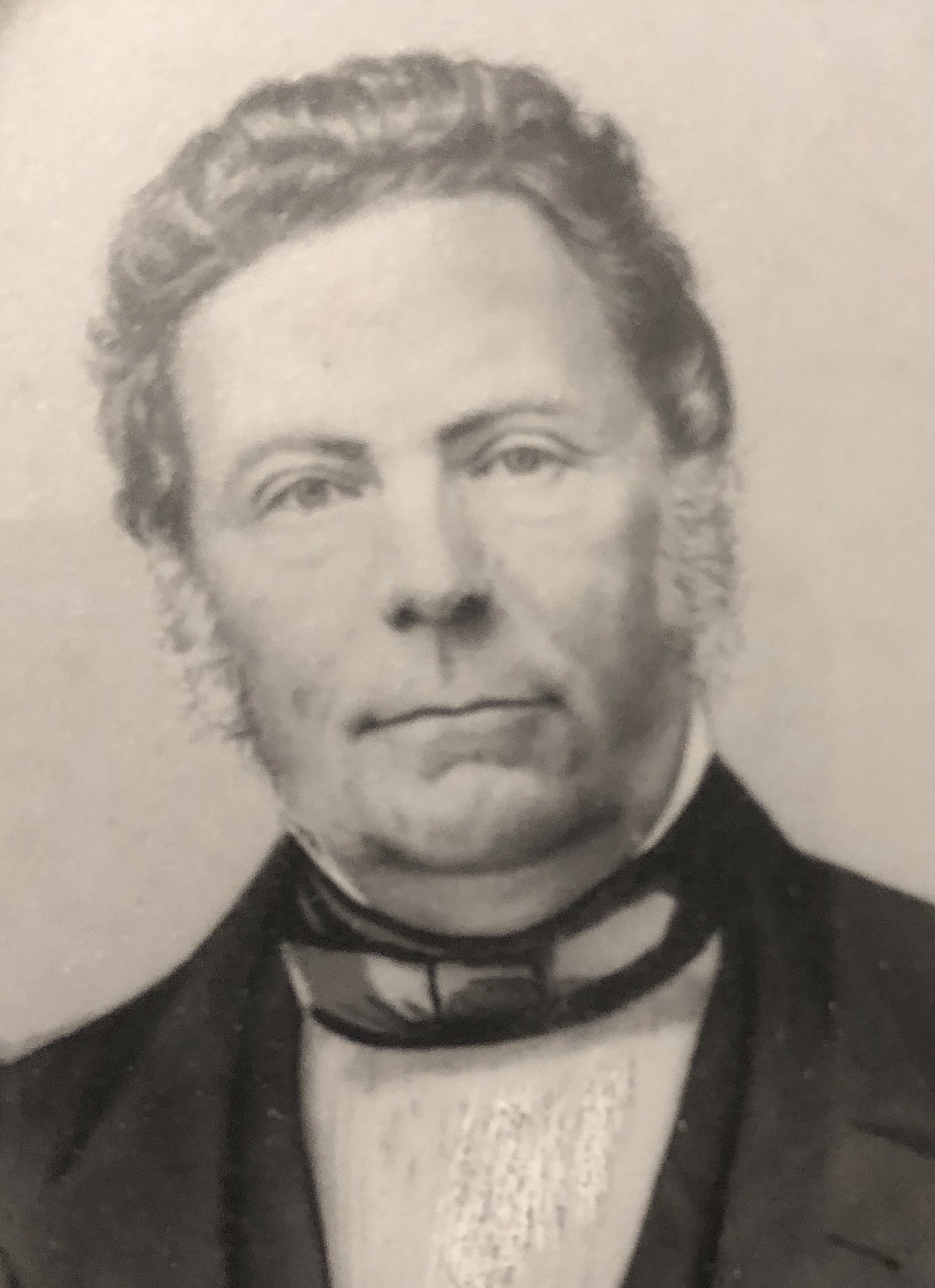
Benjamin Wegner, the director-general from 1822 to 1849, during Blaafarveværket's heyday

=== Royal ownership ===
Blaafarveværket was founded by King Christian VII of Denmark-Norway in 1776. Its early history is closely tied to that of the Royal Porcelain Factory in Copenhagen, as cobalt was essential for decorating porcelain. The establishment of the company represented an enormous investment on the part of the King, equivalent to the tax revenues for all of Denmark-Norway for a whole year. According to historian Ingerid Hagen, Blaafarveværket was one of the few Dano-Norwegian companies with lasting significance from the mercantilist era, played an important role in Norwegian trade with Denmark, the Netherlands and countries in Asia and had a decisive impact on the Norwegian economy in the period around 1814.

=== The Benecke–Wegner era ===
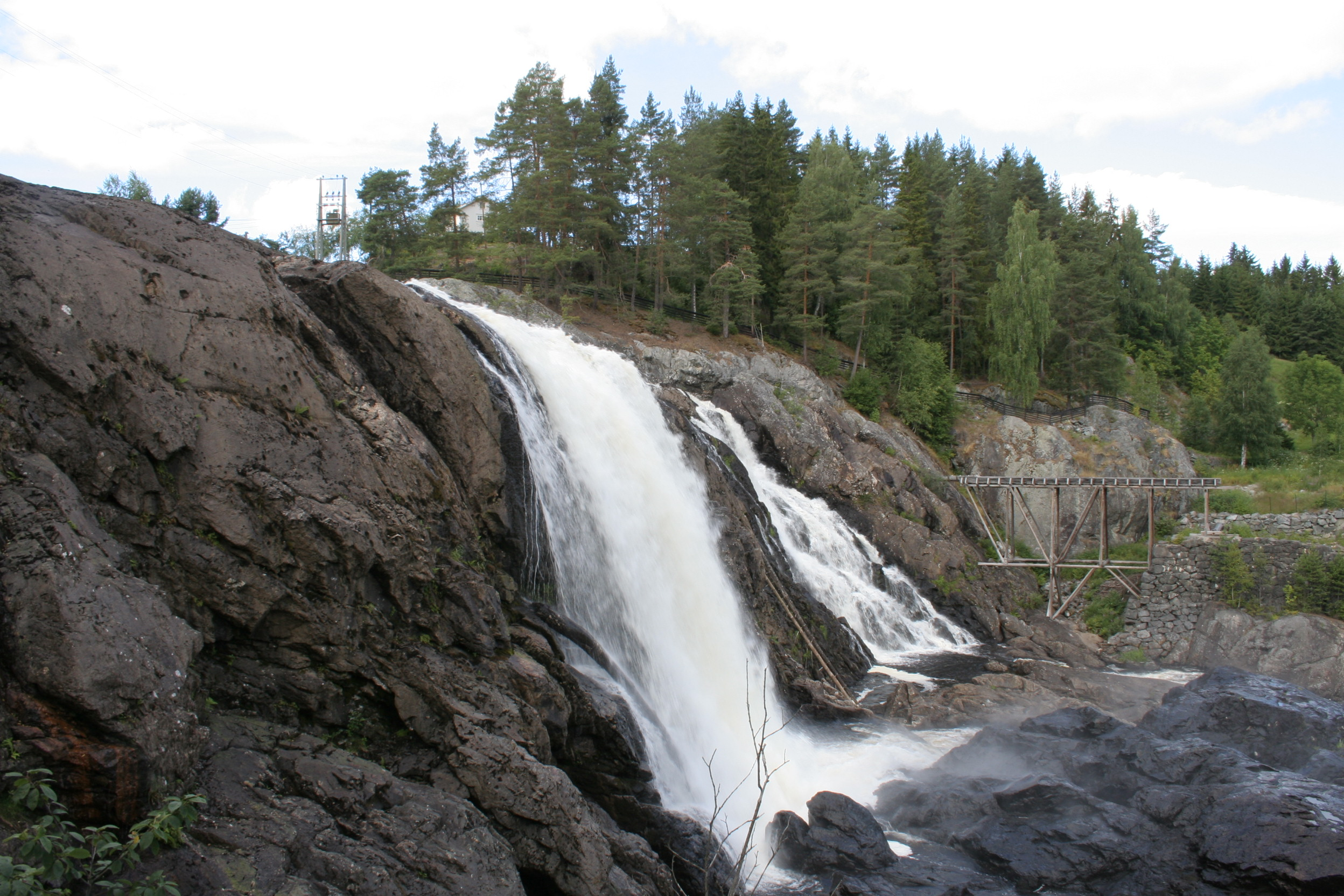
Haugfossen

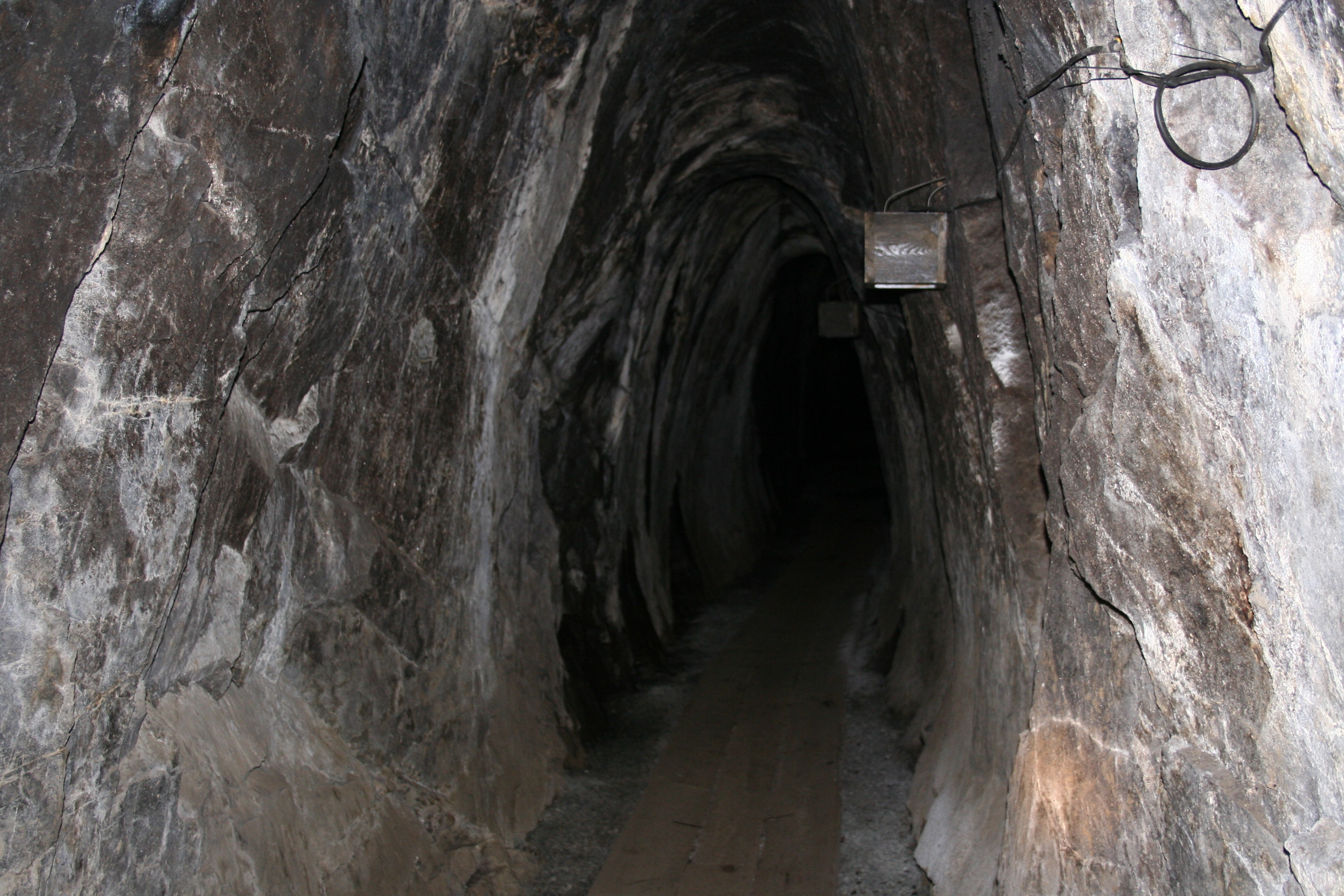
Mines

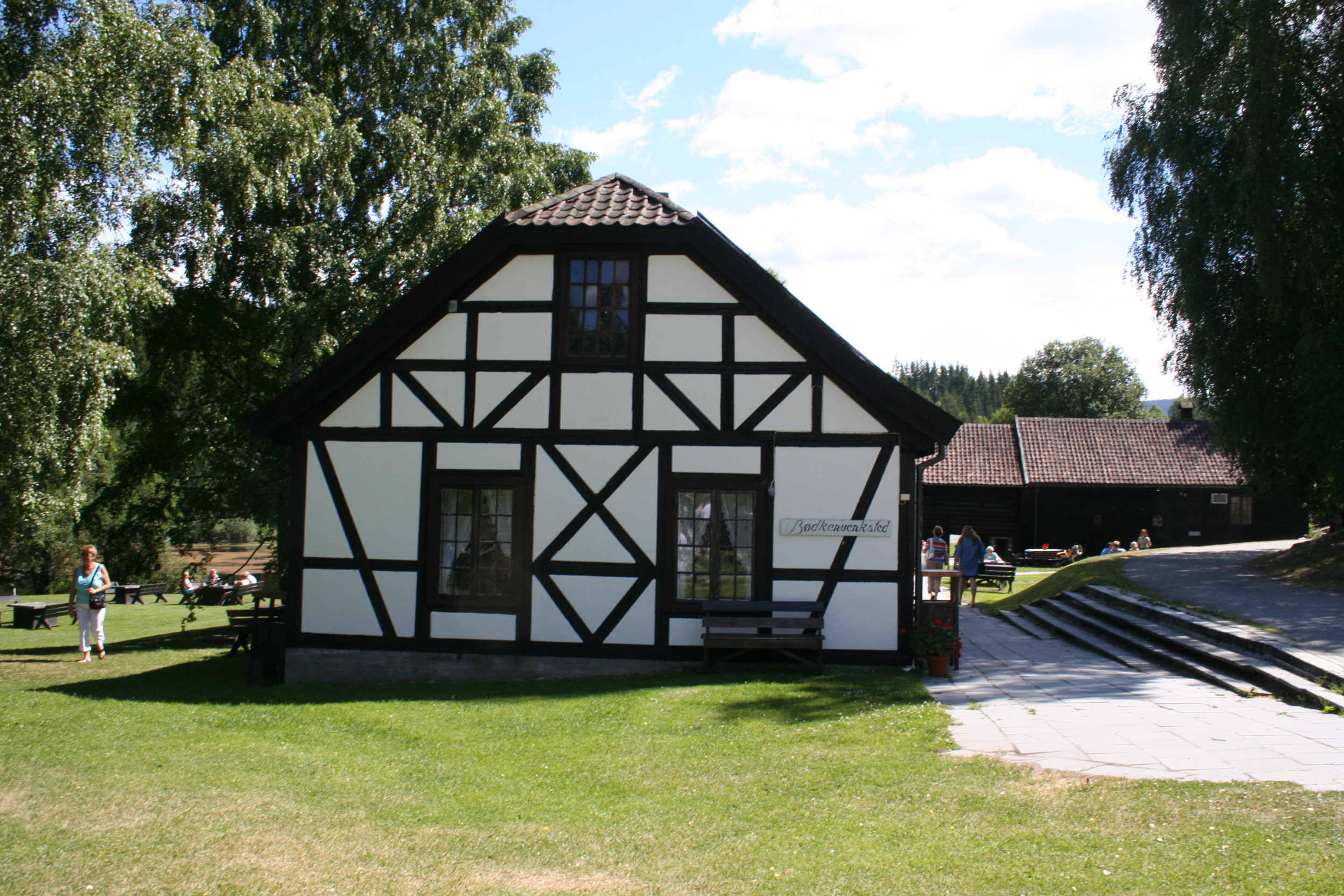
Bøtkerverkstedet (cooper workshop)

During the Napoleonic Wars the royal company was pledged by the king as security for a loan, and when the state could not redeem the pledge after the Napoleonic Wars, it was taken over by the bankruptcy estate of the Swedish businessman Peter Wilhelm Berg, and sold at a public auction to a group of investors led by the prominent Berlin banker Wilhelm Christian Benecke (since ennobled as Baron Benecke). The purchase, officially in the name of a Christiania-based merchant who acted as a strawman, was orchestrated by Benecke's young associate Benjamin Wegner, who came to Norway to evaluate the company and buy it if he saw fit. After few years Benecke and Wegner formally acquired all the shares, and the company legally operated as Benecke & Wegner. Wegner also took over as director-general (CEO), a position he held from 1822 until 1849. During Benecke and Wegner's ownership, the company saw a large expansion and became the largest company in the country. It employed more than 2,000 workers, and in its peak supplied 80 percent of the world market for cobalt pigments. Wegner also instituted many important social reforms for the workers.

=== Reduced activity 1849–1898 ===
The economic crisis resulting from the revolutions of 1848, in addition to the competition from the new and cheaper synthetic blue dye, ultramarine, led to the bankruptcy of Blaafarveværket in 1849. The company was sold to its most important business partner, Goodhall & Reeves of England. However, due to the economic recession, the new owners did not succeed in making the company profitable again, and in 1855 it was sold to a German company, Sächsischer Blaufarbenwerkverein. The production of pigment at the works ceased in 1857, but mining was kept up until 1898, when the company was dissolved.

=== Museum and art gallery ===
Today Blaafarveværket is a large open-air industrial museum and art gallery.

In 1968 a project to make Blaafarveværket available to the public as an industrial museum was started, on the initiative of Kjell Rasmus Steinsvik and his wife Tone Sinding Steinsvik. In 1970 the non-profit foundation Stiftelsens Modums Blaafarveværket was founded. Blaafarveværket has since become one of the most important art galleries in Scandinavia, and has over the years exhibited the works of many major Norwegian and foreign artists. In the summer of 2003, the gallery hosted an exhibition of the paintings of Queen Margrethe II of Denmark. In 1993, the old cobalt mines opened as a tourist attraction, and the entire area now serves as a large open-air museum. Since the 1990s Blaafarveværket has been the largest and best preserved traditional mining museum in Europe, and one of Norway's most visited attractions. It is presented to the public like the mining company it was during its heyday around 1840. The museum and art gallery are operated by the foundation on a non-profit basis and are funded partially by public and private grants and partially by tickets sales and related activities.

The former Kongsberg Silver Mines with the current Norwegian Mining Museum is located about 30 kilometres from Blaafarveværket, but the museum and the parts of the former silver mines that are open to the public are significantly less extensive, and the preserved parts of the mining environment are more limited.
