= Karenus Kristofer Thinn =

Norwegian judge (1850–1942)

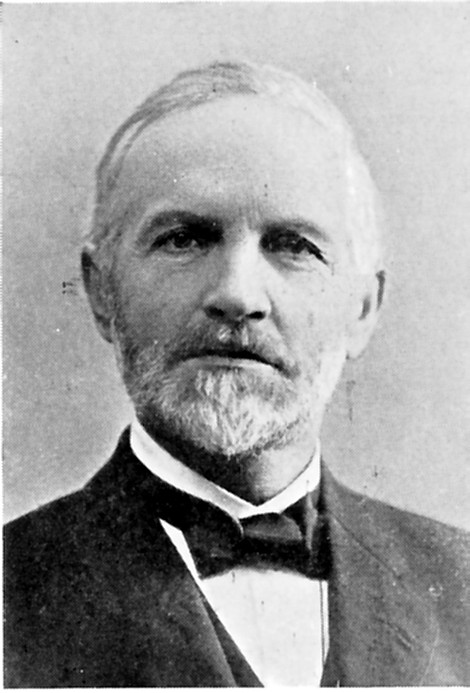
Karenus Kristofer Thinn.

Karenus Kristofer Thinn (19 December 1850 – 24 March 1942) was a Norwegian judge, born in Østre Toten Municipality. In 1891, he was a presiding judge (lagmann) in Hålogaland, Borgarting and Agder. In 1902, he was appointed extraordinary Supreme Court assessor. From 1909 to 1920, he served as its tenth Chief Justice.

Legal offices
Preceded by Einar Løchen	Chief Justice of the Supreme Court of Norway; 1909–1920	Succeeded by Herman Scheel
