= Grønn =

Grønn is a surname of Norwegian origin, cognate to the English-language surname Green. People with that name include:

- Birger Grønn (1898-1988), Norwegian engineer
- Hans Finne-Grønn (1903-2001), Norwegian painter
- Jørgen Finne-Grønn (1905-1998), Norwegian diplomat
- Karen Grønn-Hagen (1903-1982), Norwegian politician
- Ole Henrik Grønn (born 1984), Norwegian politician
- Stian Herlofsen Finne-Grønn (1869-1963), Norwegian lawyer, archivist, genealogist and museum director

Or the word "Grønn" could just refer to the colour green itself.

Not be confused with Gronn, a neighbourhood in the city of Luxembourg.

== See also ==
- Grønning (disambiguation)
