= Finne =

Finne may refer to:

== People ==
- Bård Finne (born 1995), Norwegian footballer
- Ewa Thalén Finné (born 1959), Swedish Moderate Party politician
- Ferdinand Finne (1910–1999), Norwegian artist
- Finne Jager, also known as Phynn (born 1984), Dutch disc jockey
- Gabriel Finne (1866–1899), Norwegian writer
- Geir Finne (1948–2020), Norwegian politician
- Gunnar Finne (1886–1952), Finnish sculptor
- Hans Finne-Grønn (1903–2001), Norwegian painter
- Julie Finne-Ipsen, Danish golf player
- Jørgen Finne-Grønn (1905–1998), Norwegian diplomat
- Severin Finne (1883–1953), Norwegian fencer
- Stian Herlofsen Finne-Grønn (1869–1963), Norwegian lawyer, archivist, genealogist and museum director

== Places ==
- Baile na Finne or Fintown, Ireland
- Finne, Saxony-Anhalt, Germany
- Finne (hills), Germany
- Loch Finne or Lough Finn, Ireland
- Loch Bó Finne or Lough Bofin (Galway), Ireland

== See also ==
- Finns
