= Hans Povelsson Paus the Elder =

Norwegian priest (1587–1648)

Sir Hans Povelsson Paus the Elder (1587 – 1648) (Note: Although the family name Paus is attested in his lifetime, he usually omitted it in everyday use in accordance with the custom of the time, and was often known by his given name and patronymic; the exact spelling of both names could vary, both in Latinized and Norwegian versions. In formal documents his name would typically be rendered in Latin, e.g. as Johannes Paulli[nus] Asloensis [Hans Paulson of Oslo] in the records of the University of Copenhagen. As a member of the clergy, one of the two privileged estates, he was styled as herr in Norwegian or Dominus in Latin, conventionally rendered as Sir as an ecclesiastical title in English; the Norwegian style herr was (until the 19th century) reserved for members of the clergy and the nobility; its predecessor sira (sir) had been introduced as the style for clergymen in Norway in the 13th century and gradually been replaced by the Norwegianized version herr from the 15th century.) was a Norwegian priest.

== Early life and education ==
He grew up in Oslo together with his brother, fellow priest Peder Povelsson Paus (b. 1590); the brothers have long been known as the earliest certain ancestors of the Paus family. The fact that both brothers received the best and most costly education available in Denmark-Norway and their apparent social connections to powerful men in Oslo/Eastern Norway show that they clearly belonged to the elite of 16th century Oslo. According to S. H. Finne-Grønn, the brothers were almost certainly the sons of burgher of Oslo Povel Hansson (born ca. 1545–50), a son of canon at St Mary's Church Hans Olufsson (died 1570), who held personal noble rank.

He became a student at the University of Copenhagen around 1607–08 under the name Johannes Paulli[nus] Asloensis. Returning as a tutor at the Oslo Cathedral School, he was chosen as the first singer by Bishop Niels Claussøn Senning on 11 May 1609. Like his younger brother, he sang alto. In 1616, he earned his bachelor's degree in Copenhagen.

== Career ==
In 1616, he became the head tutor at the Oslo Cathedral School. Shortly after, he was appointed chaplain at Oslo Cathedral. In late 1622, he was elected parish priest in Fredrikstad, succeeding Anders Flor, and took his office oath before the bishop on 22 January 1623.

== Personal life ==
Hans Paus was married twice; S. H. Finne-Grønn suggested in two articles in Norsk Personalhistorisk Tidsskrift in 1910 that his first wife was "most likely" the daughter of Oslo mayor Anders Nilssøn (brother of Bishop Jens Nilssøn), but later modified this in his book Slekten Paus [The Paus Family]. Hans Paus's second marriage was to Ingeborg Lemmich (died 1696), daughter of Hans Henningsen Lemmich. Ingeborg had been previously married to the wealthy Fredrikstad merchant Oluf Holck, bringing a substantial fortune with her.

Hans was the father of, among others, Povel Hansson Paus (1620–1658), who, after studying at the University of Franeker, earned his magister's degree at the University of Copenhagen in 1649 and, in 1655, parish priest in Lier, Bragernes, and Strømsø; and Anders Hansson Paus (1622–1689), who, like his brother, studied at the University of Franeker and from 1663 was the parish priest in Jevnaker. Povel Hansson Paus participated in the homage to Prince Christian in 1656 and the estates meeting in 1657 as a representative of the clergy in the Oslo diocese. From Anders Hansson Paus, there is an academic oration printed in Greek at the University of Franeker in 1644, where he lists chancellor Jens Bjelke, Bjelke's son-in-law Daniel Ottesen Bildt of Hafslund, Admiral Sten Willumsen Rosenvinge of Tose, and Bishop Oluf Boesen as patrons of his father who funded his education. It is dedicated to these four as well as to his father. "The text ends with a Latin verse praising the speaker by the contemporary Hungarian student Nicolaus Szoboszlai, who proudly states that Paus's honor will resound as long as the world stands," writes Finne-Grønn. Anders Hansson Paus was, among other things, the grandfather of timber merchant and sawmill owner in Ringerike, Anders Hansen Paus (1691–1745), who was first married to Annichen Larsdatter Thue (1695–1740), daughter of Christiania merchant Lars Thue, and later to Barbara Sophie Akeleye. His daughter from his first marriage, Karen Paus (born 1721), was married to Andreas Jensen Stoltenberg (1724–1751).
