= Povel Hansson Paus =

Norwegian priest

Sir Povel Hansson Paus (1620 – 1658) (Note: As a member of the clergy, one of the two privileged estates, he was styled as herr in Norwegian or Dominus in Latin, conventionally rendered as Sir as an ecclesiastical title in English; the Norwegian style herr was (until the 19th century) reserved for members of the clergy and the nobility; its predecessor sira (sir) had been introduced as the style for clergymen in Norway in the 13th century and gradually been replaced by the Norwegianized version herr from the 15th century.) was a Norwegian priest.

== Biography ==
He was born in Oslo in 1620 as the son of the priest Hans Povelsson Paus the Elder (1587–1648). He attended Latin school in Frederiksborg, Denmark.

He then went abroad for university studies together with his brother Anders Hansson Paus. From November 1642 the brothers studied philosophy and theology at the University of Franeker. From Anders Hansson Paus, there is an academic oration printed in Greek at the University of Franeker in 1644, where he lists some of the country's most prominent men—chancellor Jens Bjelke, Bjelke's son-in-law Daniel Ottesen Bildt of Hafslund, Admiral Sten Willumsen Rosenvinge of Tose, and Bishop Oluf Boesen—as patrons of his father who funded his education, and S. H. Finne-Grønn writes that the same patrons certainly also paid for Povel's studies. In May 1649 Povel earned the Magister's degree at the University of Copenhagen. (Note: The Magister's degree was the highest degree at the Faculty of Philosophy. Only a small minority of priests possessed this degree; many of them rose to prominent positions such as bishop or provost.)

He then served as tutor at Oslo Cathedral School before becoming the school's conrector.

In 1653 he received a royal decree that promised him a position as parish priest of a parish to which the Crown held right of patronage. In September 1655 he became parish priest of Lier, Bragernes and Strømsø (i.e. Drammen and surroundings). He celebrated his first mass in Bragernes Church on 21 October 1655.

Povel Hansson Paus participated in the homage to Prince Christian in 1656 and in the meeting of the estates of the realm—the closest thing the kingdom had to a parliament—in 1657 as a representative of the clergy in the Diocese of Oslo. He died aged only 38 in February 1658. He was interred inside Bragernes Church, an honor reserved for notables. He married Magdalene Eriksdatter in Christiania in 1652.
