= Oslo Museum =

Museum in Oslo, Norway

Coordinates: 59.9240°N 10.7033°E

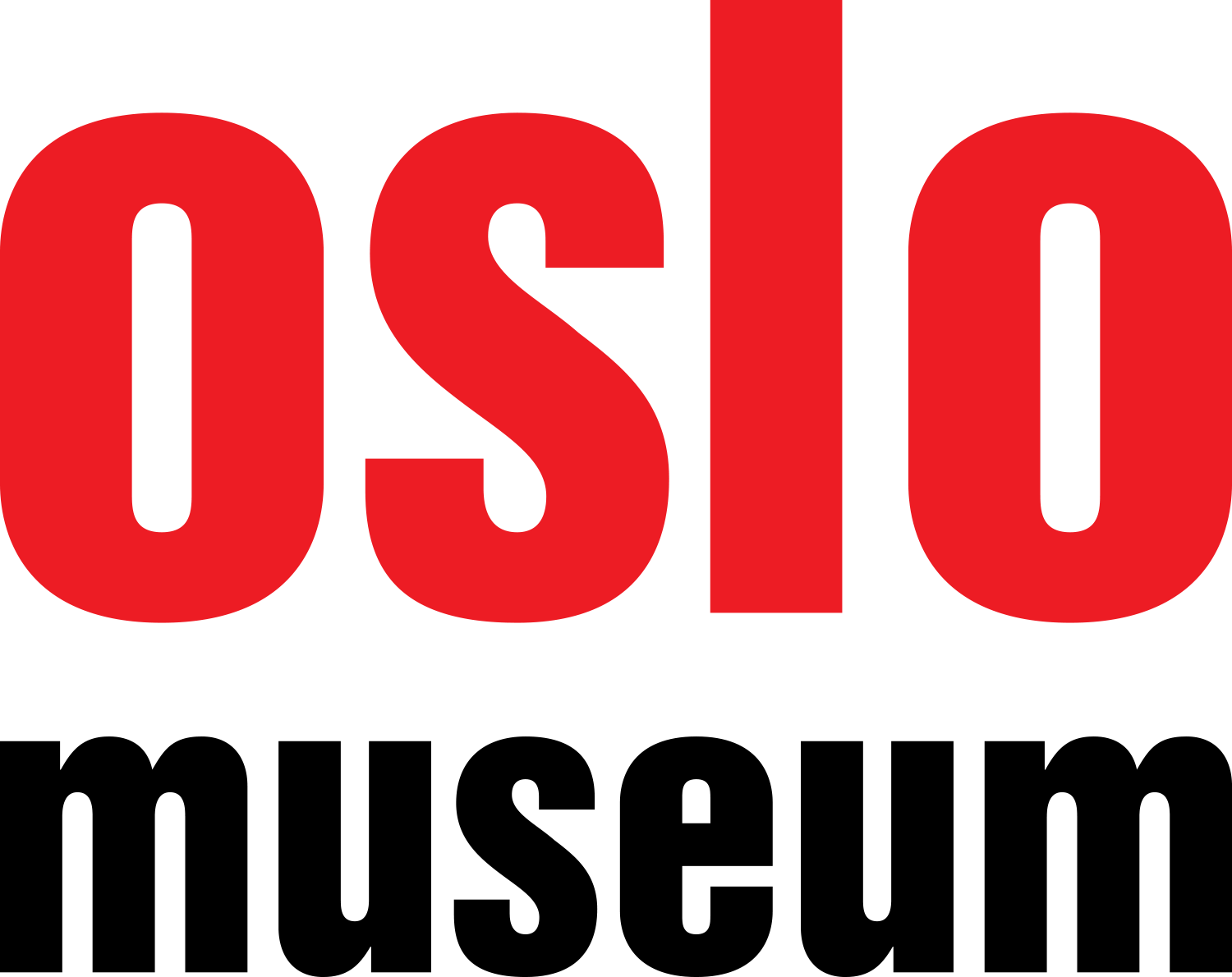

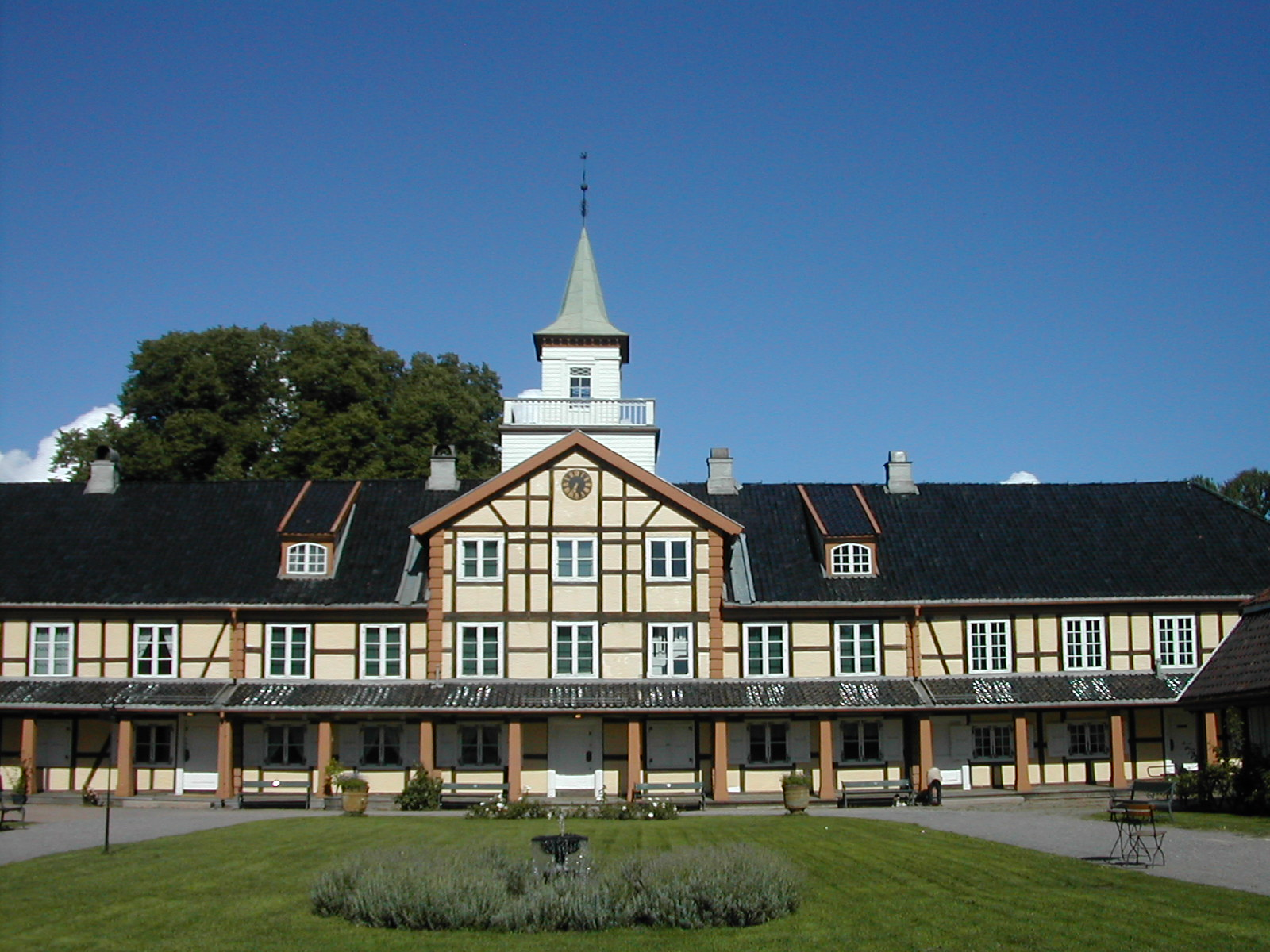
- Established: 1 January 2006
- Location: Frogner Park and Grønland and Sagene
- Director: Marie Skoie

Oslo Museum (Norwegian: Oslo museum) is a museum of cultural history focusing on the history of Oslo, Norway, covering city history and urban development, labour history, theatre history and cultural diversity. The museum's four departments are located in Frogner Park (Oslo City Museum and Theatre Museum), Grønland, Oslo (Intercultural Museum) and Sagene (Labour Museum). The museum is headquartered at Frogner Manor in Frogner Park, together with two of its departments; Oslo City Museum and Theatre Museum.

== History ==
It was formed in 2006 by the merger of Oslo City Museum (Bymuseet), the Intercultural Museum (Interkulturelt Museum) and the Theatre Museum (Teatermuseet), which are now departments within Oslo Museum. A fourth museum, the Labour Museum (Arbeidermuseet), joined in 2013. Oslo City Museum, Intercultural Museum, and Theatre Museum joined forces to create the new museum as a consequence of the State Museum reform. The new museum foundation functioned under the working title "Capital Museum", but from December 2006, it adopted the name "Oslo Museum".

== Departments at Oslo Museum ==
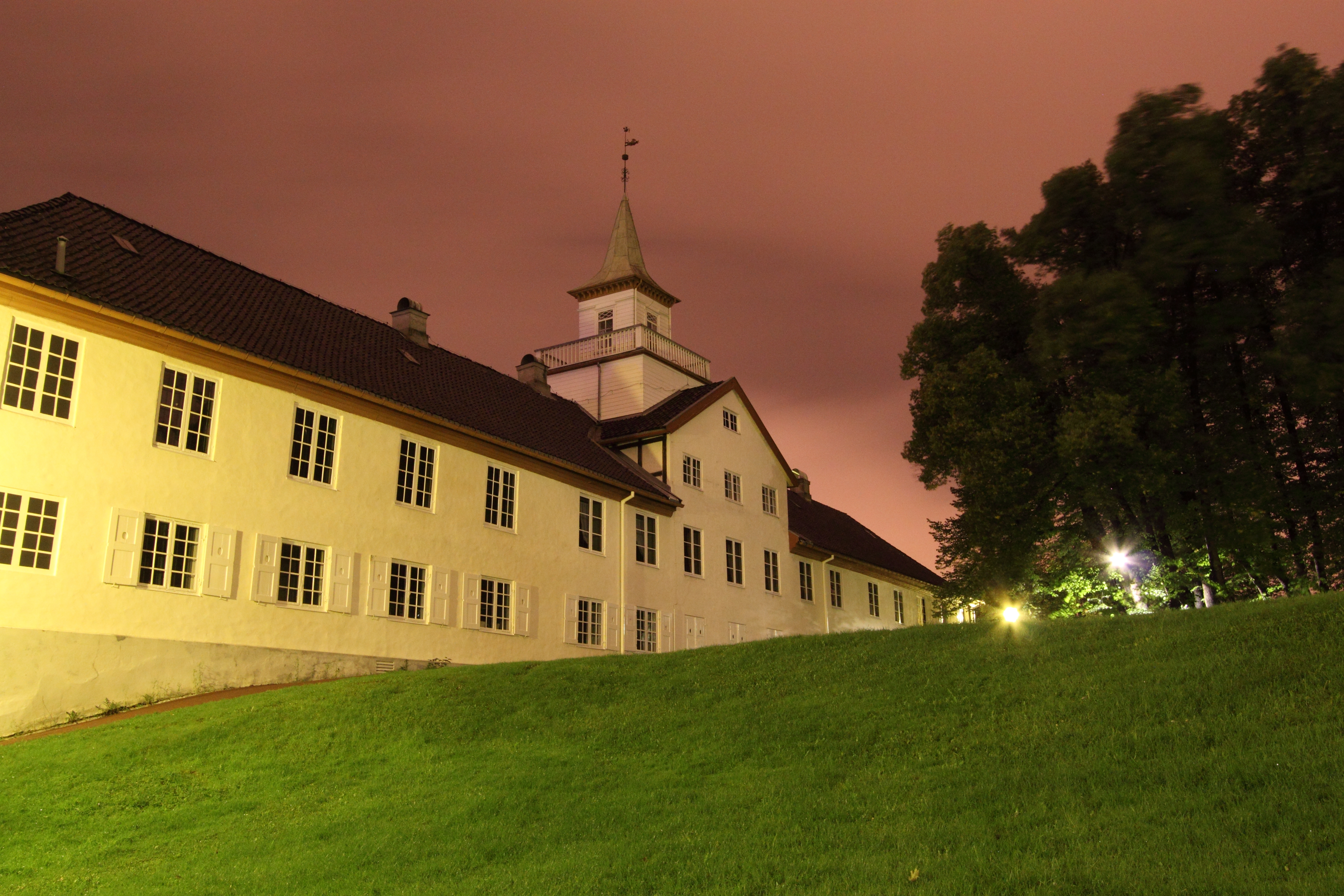
Oslo City Museum and Theatre Museum are located at Frogner Manor

=== Oslo City Museum ===
The Oslo City Museum was first founded in 1905 as the association Foreningen Det gamle Christiania. Initiator and curator until 1912 was architect Fritz Holland (1874-1959). A committee members included Bishop of Oslo Anton Christian Bang, architects Torolf Prytz and Harald Olsen, artist Eilif Peterssen and military officer Thomas Heftye. The museum moved into the main building at Frogner Manor in 1909. Stian Herlofsen Finne-Grønn (1869–1963) became curator of this organization in 1912 and was the director from 1920 to 1949.

=== Theatre Museum ===
The Theatre Museum is dedicated to the history of theatre and performing arts. The museum was established in 1972, but the precursor Christiania Theatre Historical Society opened in 1939, as a theatrical exhibition in Rådmannsgården, a preserved building in Gamle Oslo. Founding members of the Christiania Theatre Historical Society in 1922 was actor/theater director/artist Johan Fahlstrøm (1867-1938), actress Sophie Reimers (1853-1932), actor Harald Otto (1865-1928) and director/theatre historian Johan Peter Bull (1883-1960). Bull was the Society's first chairman and the driving force behind the collection of artifacts. The objects were in 1947 transferred to Norwegian Actors' Equity Association. In 1956 the Theatre History company created a successor of the Theatre History Association. The purpose was to support the museum and promote theatre research. The museum was formerly organized as a foundation in 1972.

The Theatre Museum acquired new premises in the former town hall of Christiania, Gamle rådhus, under the support for semi-public museums with grants from Oslo. Author and playwright Carl Fredrik Engelstad (1915–1996) took over as chairman. After a fire on 5 May 1996, Teatermuseet was closed but regained a new location at Rådmannsgården in 1997. By the end of 2010 Oslo Museum discontinued tenancy in Gamle rådhus for economic reasons.

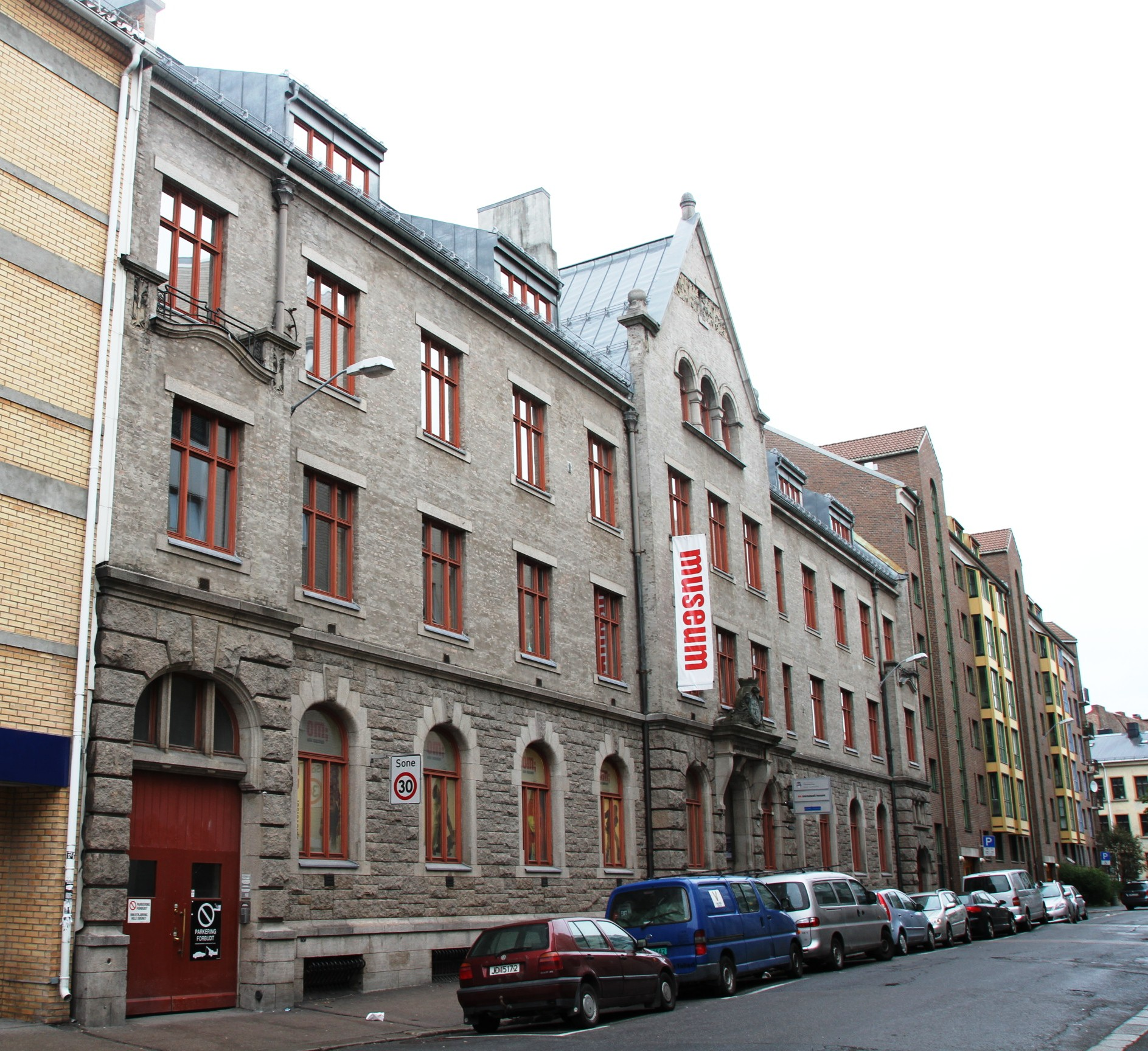
Intercultural Museum is located at the Grønland Cultural Station

=== Intercultural Museum ===
The Intercultural Museum, formerly the International Cultural Center and Museum, is located in Grønland Culture Station at Tøyenbekken 5 in Oslo. The museum was started in 1990 by Bente Guro Møller and works to promote understanding and respect for cultural diversity. On the ground floor the museum has a permanent exhibition focusing on immigration history and cultural changes in Norwegian society. The gallery exhibits topical art from artists with immigrant backgrounds. In addition, the museum organizes seminars, concerts, lectures and discussion evenings. In 1999 the museum moved to Grønland Culture Station and the old prison cells were converted into a museum. The house includes an art gallery, concert hall, seminar rooms, and a culture workshop.

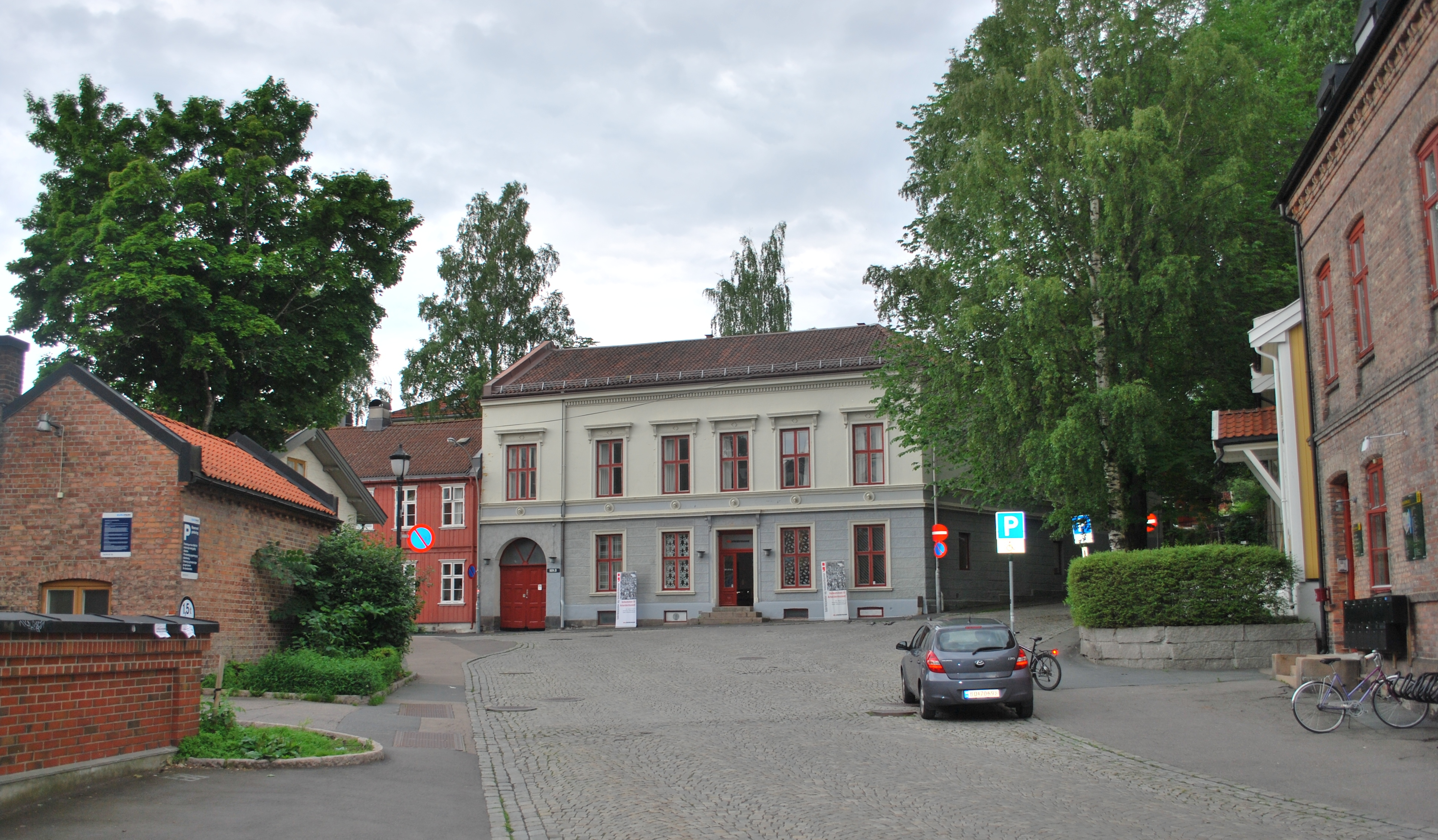
Labor Museum is located in Apotekergården at Sagveien 28

=== Labour Museum ===
The Labour Museum opened during June 2013 in Apotekergarden at Sagveien 28 in the district of Sagene. In 2011 Oslo Museum had received 2.5 million kroner from the Ministry of Culture for the new labour museum. The museum shows the industrial and work history of the industrial areas along the Akerselva, which was important in the development of Norwegian industry from the 1840s.

== Collections ==
Oslo Museum collects all types of cultural material that can illuminate the historical and contemporary Oslo. The objects are stored in reservoirs at Frogner Manor, and in some satellites around Oslo. Many of these are digitized and made available to the public on DigitalMuseum. Particularly valuable are the art collection and photo collection with Oslo scenes and portraits. The photo collection is one of the largest and documents the city's development from photography's infancy to the present. In 2010 Oslo Museum along with the Oslo City Archives established the site Oslobilder as an online image base with searchable access to the digitized parts of photo collections from both institutions.

Oslo Museum displays the museum's exhibitions and also has satellite exhibitions at sites in Tøyen and Sagene. The museum manages events and city tours in the Kjenn din by program and publishes the journal of cultural history, Byminner. The museum has at any given time several traveling exhibitions on tour in the country.
