= Grønning (disambiguation) =

Grønning is a small village in the municipality of Hadsel in Nordland county, Norway.

Grønning may also refer to:

== Places ==
- Grønning Church, in the village of Grønning

== People ==
- Kurt Grønning (1936–2025), Danish footballer
- Jeppe Grønning (born 1991), Danish footballer
- Pia Grønning (born 1949), Danish film actor
- Sebastian Grønning (born 1997), Danish footballer

== See also ==
- Grønn, a surname
