= Frogner Manor (painting) =

Painting by Johan Christian Dahl

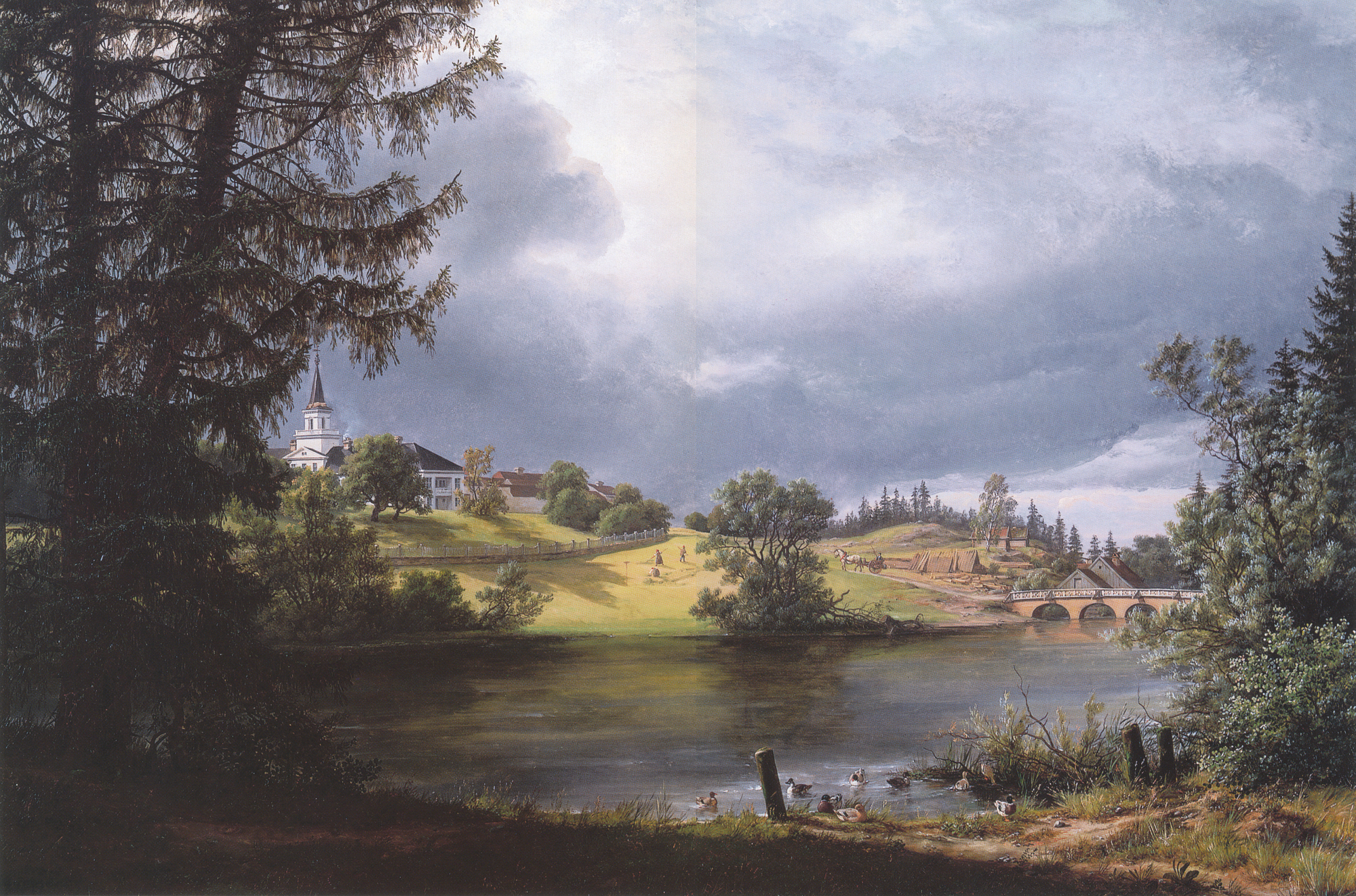
- Artist: Johan Christian Dahl
- Year: 1842
- Type: Oil on canvas
- Dimensions: 65.9 cm × 99 cm (25.9 in × 39 in)
- Location: Private collection

Frogner Manor is an oil on canvas painting by the Norwegian artist Johan Christian Dahl, executed in 1842. It shows the eponymous Frogner Manor and its surrounding landscape gardens. It is held in a private collection in the United States.

== History ==
The painting was executed in 1842 on behalf of landowner Benjamin Wegner, the owner of Frogner Manor. Dahl was already a world-famous artist, and was on one of his rare visits to Norway, where he was treated almost as if on a state visit. He was then a guest at Frogner Manor and was asked to create the painting. The canvas was exhibited in the Art Association of Christiania in 1852. It was in a private collection in Dresden, Germany, until 1945 and has a somewhat enigmatic provenance. In 1998, it was sold by 3.3 million NOK to a Norwegian-American couple through Count Wedels Plass Auctions, which was then the Norwegian auction record for a painting at the time. The work was exhibited for a time at Frogner Manor, at the current Oslo City Museum, through loans from the new owners. It is now in a private collection in the United States.
