= Hellfjorden (Vesterålen) =

Fjord in Nordland, Norway

- Interactive map of the fjord
- Location: Nordland county, Norway
- Coordinates: 68.6784°N 14.7856°E
- Type: Fjord
- Basin countries: Norway
- Max. length: 6.5 kilometres (4.0 mi)
- Max. width: 1.3 kilometres (0.81 mi)

Hellfjorden is a fjord in Nordland county, Norway. The 6.5-kilometre (4.0 mi) long fjord is an arm off of the main Eidsfjorden and the border between Sortland Municipality and Bø Municipality runs right down the middle of the fjord.The narrow fjord cuts into the large island of Langøya in the Vesterålen archipelago. The fjord lies in a very rugged, sparsely populated area.

The bay has an inlet between the Oksneset headland, just east of the village of Guvåg on the west side of the fjord and the Hellfjordklubben peninsula on the east side of the fjord. There are many islands in the outer part of the fjord including Storøya, Ramnøya, Torskøya, and Slåttøya. Further into the fjord lie the islands of Reinøya and Teistøya. Vestpolløya is a small peninsula near the head of the fjord. There are no major settlements along the fjord and no road connections to the fjord, so it is only accessible by boat or by hiking. The now-abandoned farm named Hellfjorden is located on the east side of the bay in Sortland Municipality.

== See also ==
- List of Norwegian fjords
