= Intercultural Museum =

Museum in Oslo, Norway

Coordinates: 59.9131°N 10.7634°E

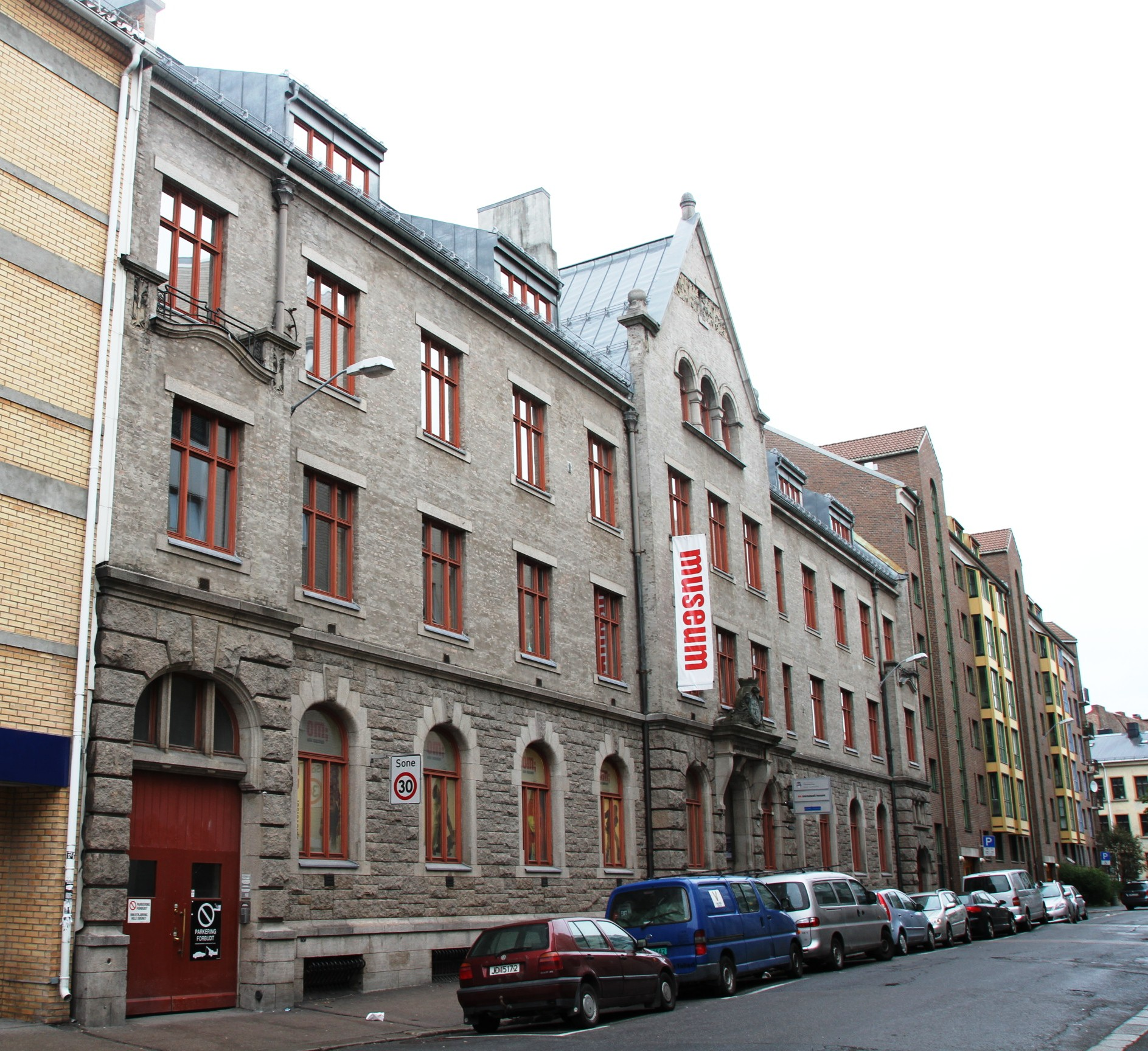

The Intercultural Museum (Interkulturelt Museum) is located at Tøyenbekken 5 in Oslo, Norway. The Intercultural Museum is a migration museum, and is primarily concerned with the collection, preservation and dissemination of Norwegian immigration history. Since 2006, the Intercultural Museum has been part of the Oslo Museum. It is situated in the district of Grønland and housed in a former police station which was built in 1900–1902 under design by architect Balthazar Lange (1854-1937).

Intercultural Museum was founded in 1990 by Bente Guro Møller who was head of the museum until 2007. Mass immigration is a relatively recent phenomenon in Norway, starting with the influx of Pakistani migrant workers in the 1970s. The Intercultural Museum was established as a response to the immigration and the cultural changes it entailed. It has received much attention for its pioneer work with the new minority groups in Norway. In 2006, it was selected as "Museum of the Year" by the Norwegian Museums Association.

The museum is open daily (except Mondays), and offers free entry for all under the age of 26 to the main exhibits and the gallery of contemporary art (free for all every first Thursday of the month). It also offers guided tours around Grønland, the historical "transit area" in downtown Oslo and one of the most obviously multicultural districts in the city.
