= Jørgen Finne-Grønn =

Norwegian diplomat (1905–1998)

Jørgen Magnus Finne-Grønn

Ambassador of Norway to Czechoslovakia and Hungary
- In office 1952–1958

Ambassador of Norway to Chile, Peru and Bolivia
- In office 1960–1966

Ambassador of Norway to Portugal
- In office 1966–1975

Personal details
- Born: July 30, 1905 Kristiania, Norway
- Died: October 3, 1998 (aged 93)
- Citizenship: Norwegian
- Spouse: Margareta Christiansen
- Relations: Hans Finne-Grønn (brother); Sofie Borchgrevink (grandmother)
- Parents: Stian Herlofsen Finne-Grønn; Margrethe Borchgrevink
- Education: Royal Frederick University
- Occupation: Diplomat
- Awards: Commander of the Order of St. Olav (1967); Order of the Polar Star; Officer of the Order of the Crown of Belgium; Grand Officer of the Order of Merit of Ecuador; Grand Cross of the Order of the Merit of Chile

Jørgen Magnus Finne-Grønn (30 July 1905 – 3 October 1998) was a Norwegian diplomat.

== Early life and family ==
He was born in Kristiania as a son of genealogist Stian Herlofsen Finne-Grønn (1869–1953) and Margrethe Borchgrevink (1873–1963). He was a brother of painter Hans Finne-Grønn and a grandson of Sofie Borchgrevink. 1947 he married Margareta Christiansen, a daughter of businessperson Christian Christiansen.

== Education and early career ==
He finished his secondary education in 1924, and graduated from the Royal Frederick University with the cand.jur. degree in 1931. He started working in the Norwegian Ministry of Foreign Affairs in the same year, and he was stationed as a secretary at the consulate in Marseille from 1933 to 1934, the legation in Ankara from 1934 to 1936, in Norway from 1936 to 1937, in New York City in 1937, the legation in London from 1941 to 1946, and in Brussels from 1946.

== Diplomatic career ==
He became an assistant secretary in the Ministry of Foreign Affairs in 1948. He was the Norwegian ambassador to Czechoslovakia and Hungary from 1952 to 1958, to Chile, Peru and Bolivia from 1960 to 1966, and Portugal from 1966 to 1975. During his time as ambassador to Czechoslovakia, there was a spying scandal. Czechoslovak citizen Vladimír Veselý was convicted for spying for Norway, and sentenced to 25 years of prison. Veselý had allegedly had contact with Norwegian intelligence officer Einar Nord Stenersen, who had indeed been dispatched to the Norwegian embassy, officially to locate surveillance bugs (which he did), but Finne-Grønn was aware of the clandestine nature of Stenersen's work.

== Decorations ==
Finne-Grønn was decorated as a Commander of the Order of St. Olav (1967) and the Order of the Polar Star, Officer of the Order of the Crown of Belgium, Grand Officer of the Order of Merit of Ecuador and held the Grand Cross of the Order of the Merit of Chile.

== Death ==
He died in October 1998 and was buried at Vestre gravlund.

== See also ==
- Czechoslovakia–Norway relations
