= Ole Henrik Grønn =

Norwegian politician

deputy representative to the Norwegian Parliament
- In office 2005–2009

Personal details
- Party: Christian Democratic Party

Ole Henrik Grønn (born 22 September 1984) is a Norwegian politician, formerly of the Christian Democratic Party.

He served as a deputy representative to the Norwegian Parliament from Østfold during the term 2005–2009. He was also a member of Sarpsborg municipal council.

In 2008, he received national attention when he came out as gay, and left the Christian Democratic Party. He did not immediately join another party, but rather continued as an independent.
