= Grønning Church =

Church in Nordland, Norway

Grønning Church Ytre Eidsfjord Church
- Grønning kirke / Ytre Eidsfjord kirke
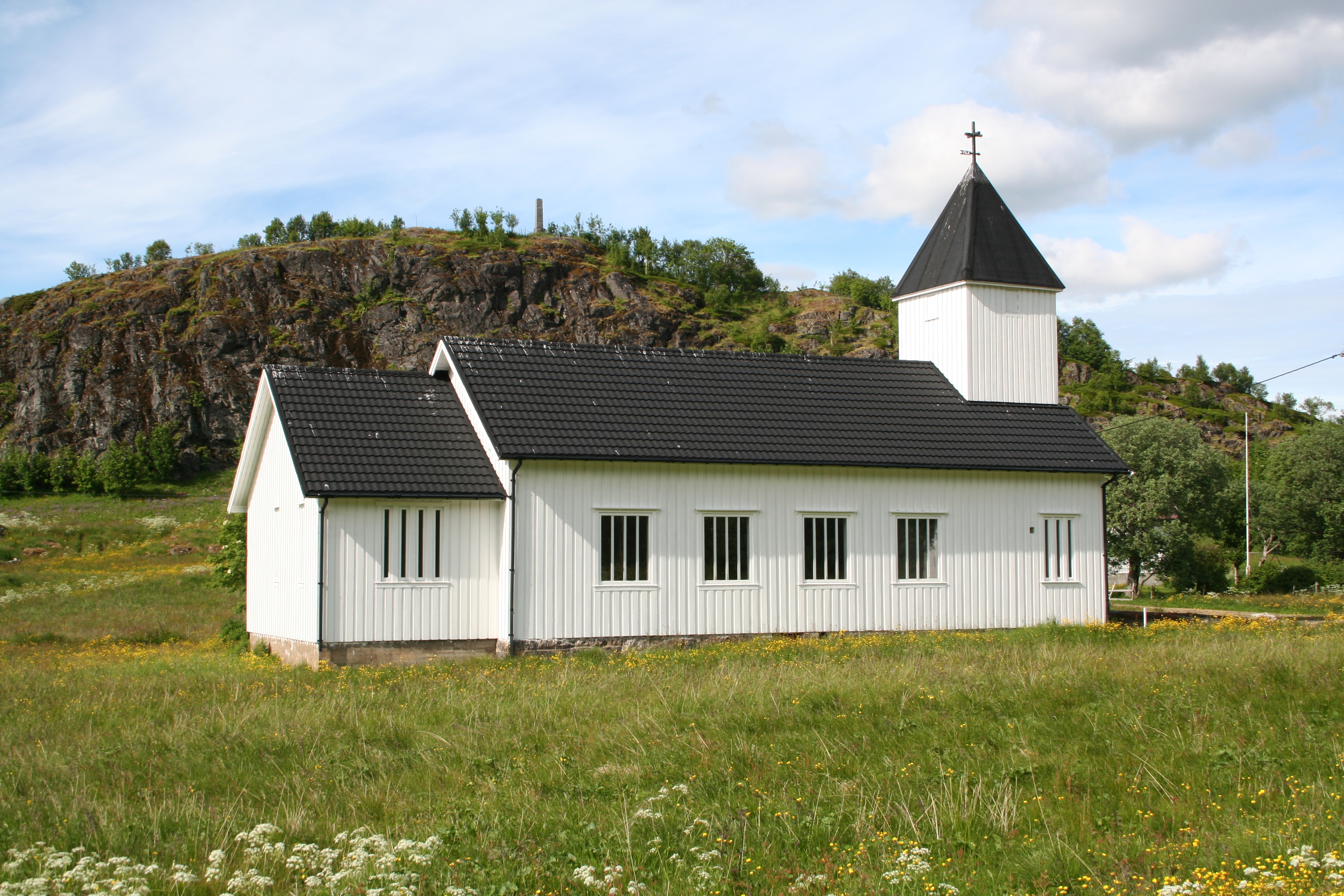
- View of the church
- Grønning Church; Ytre Eidsfjord Church
- 68.66778054°N 14.94838535°E
- Location: Hadsel, Nordland
- Country: Norway
- Denomination: Church of Norway
- Churchmanship: Evangelical Lutheran

History
- Status: Parish church
- Founded: 1882
- Consecrated: 1968

Architecture
- Functional status: Active
- Architect: Ola Stavseth
- Architectural type: Long church
- Completed: 1968 (58 years ago)
- Closed: 1935-1968

Specifications
- Capacity: 220
- Materials: Wood

Administration
- Diocese: Sør-Hålogaland
- Deanery: Vesterålen prosti
- Parish: Ytre Eidsfjord
- Norwegian Cultural Heritage Site
- Type: Church
- Status: Not protected
- ID: 84442

Grønning Church or Ytre Eidsfjord Church (Norwegian: Grønning kirke / Ytre Eidsfjord kirke) is a parish church of the Church of Norway in Hadsel Municipality in Nordland county, Norway. It is located in the tiny village of Grønning along the Eidsfjorden on the island of Langøya. It is the church for the Ytre Eidsfjord parish which is part of the Vesterålen prosti (deanery) in the Diocese of Sør-Hålogaland. The white, wooden church was built in a long church style in 1968 using plans drawn up by the architect Ola Stavseth. The church seats about 220 people.

== History ==
The first church built on this site was completed in 1882 using designs by the architect J.H. Nissen. That church burned down in 1935, but it was not rebuilt. The present building was constructed in 1968 out of the materials from an old school.

== Media gallery ==
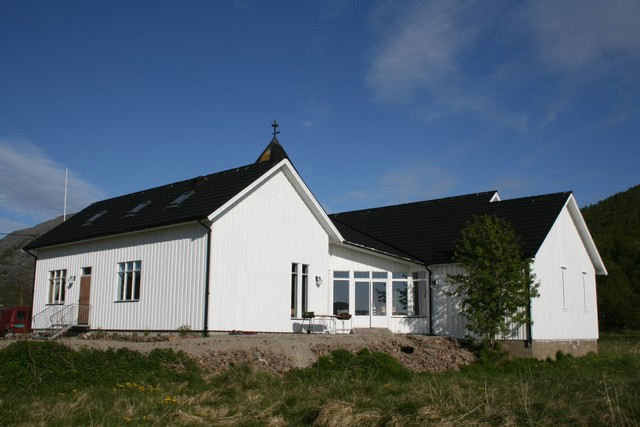
Exterior view

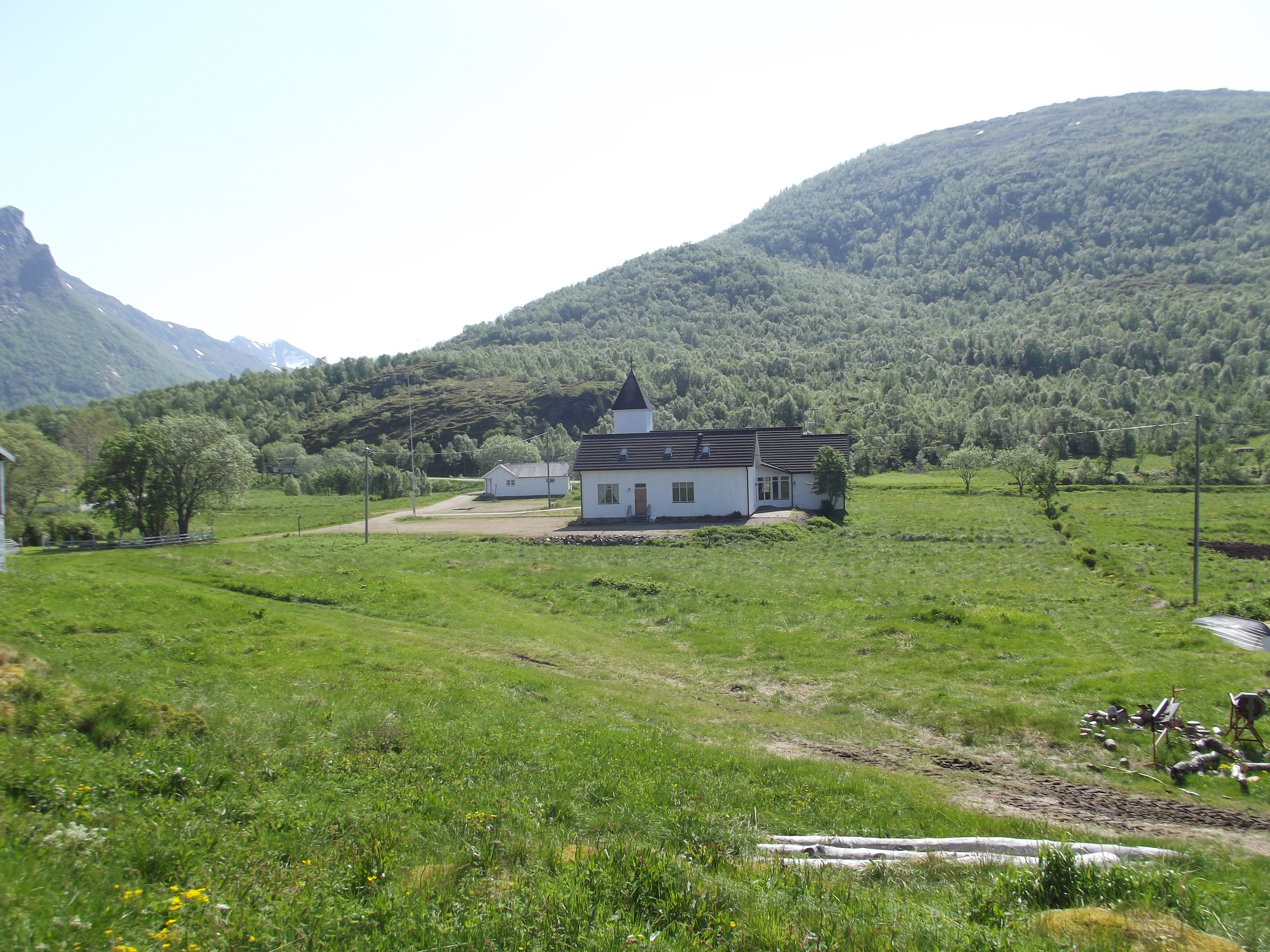
Exterior view from a distance

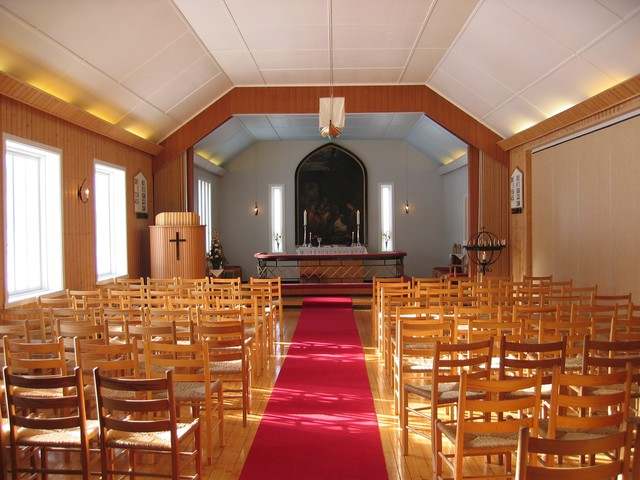
Interior view (front)

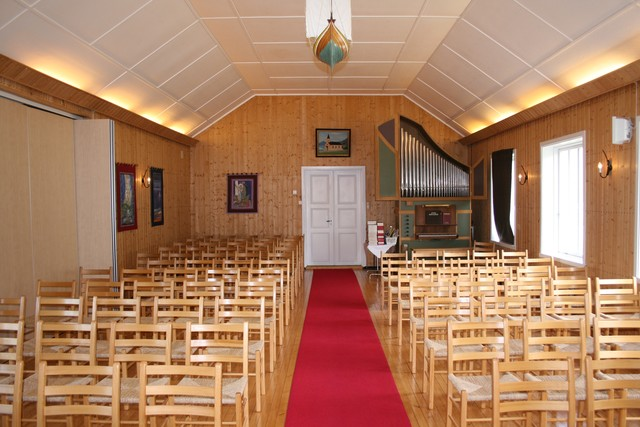
Interior view (back)

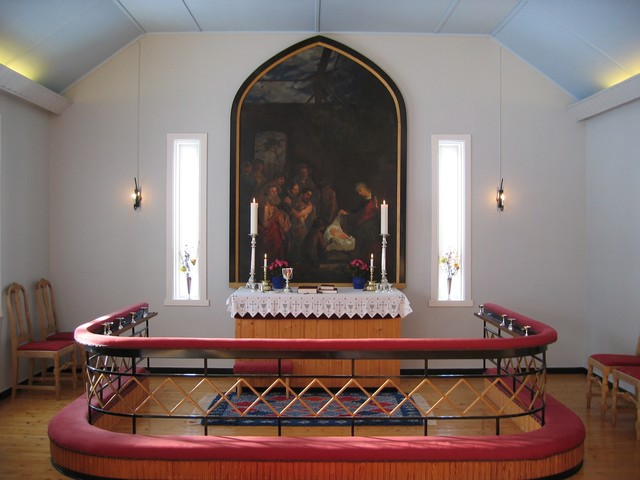
Altar

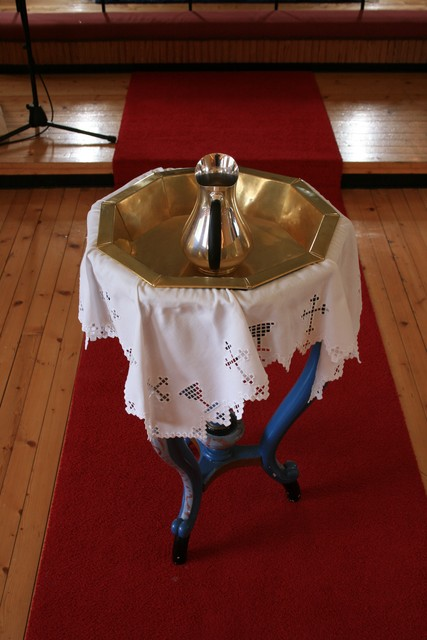
Baptismal font

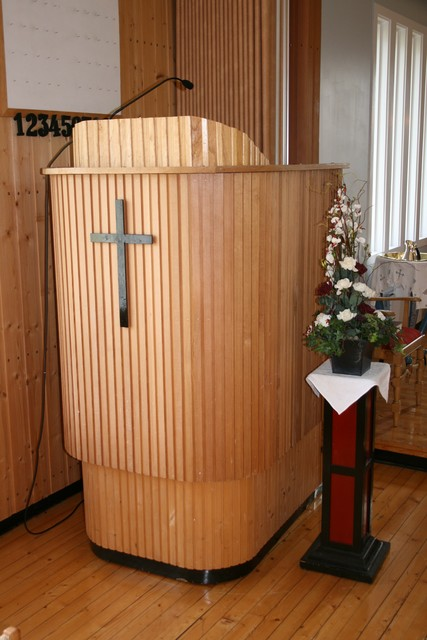
Pulpit

== See also ==
- List of churches in Sør-Hålogaland
