= Frogner Manor =

Manor house in Oslo, Norway

Coordinates: 59°55′27.41″N 10°42′10.98″E

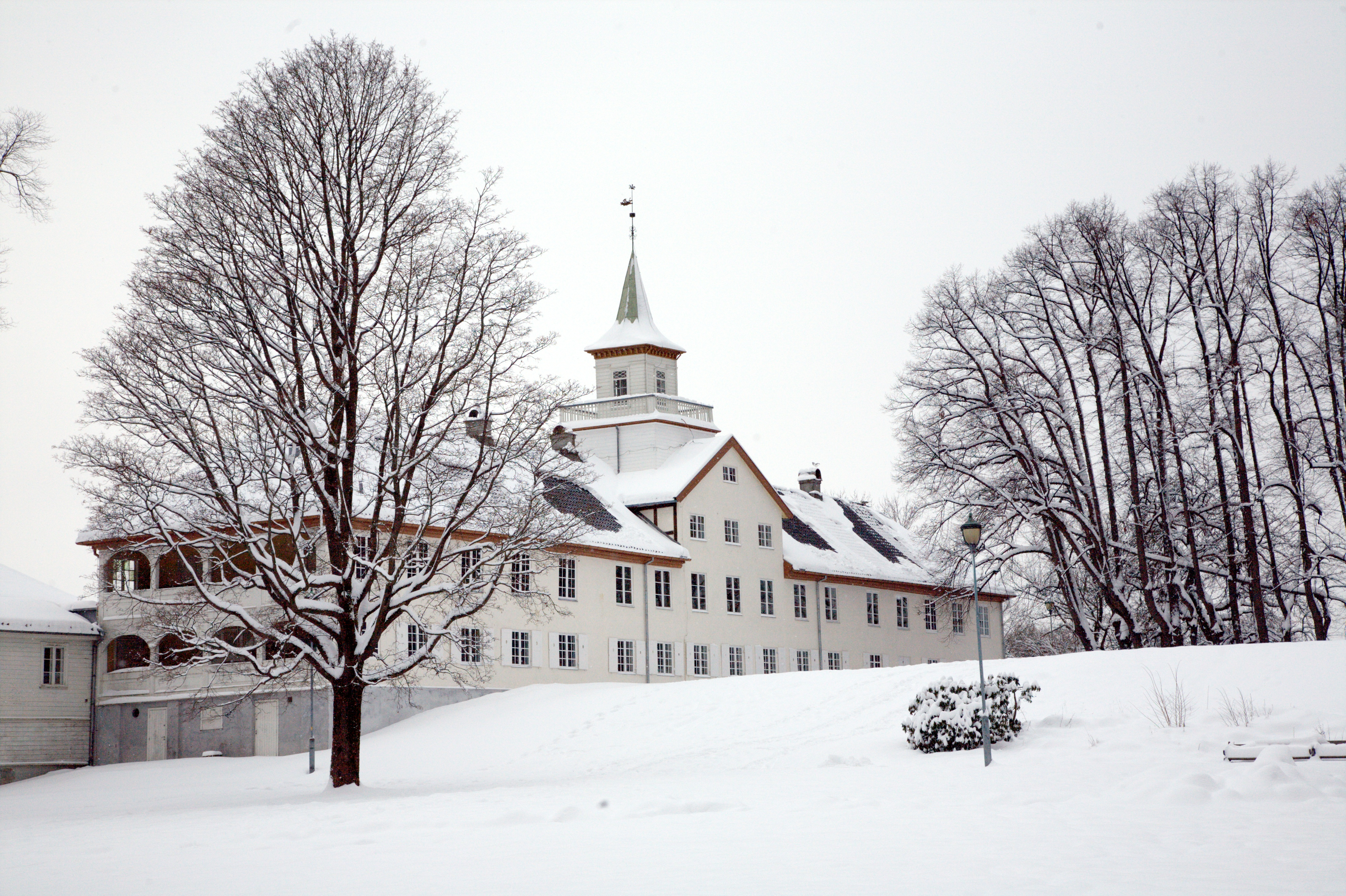
Frogner Manor

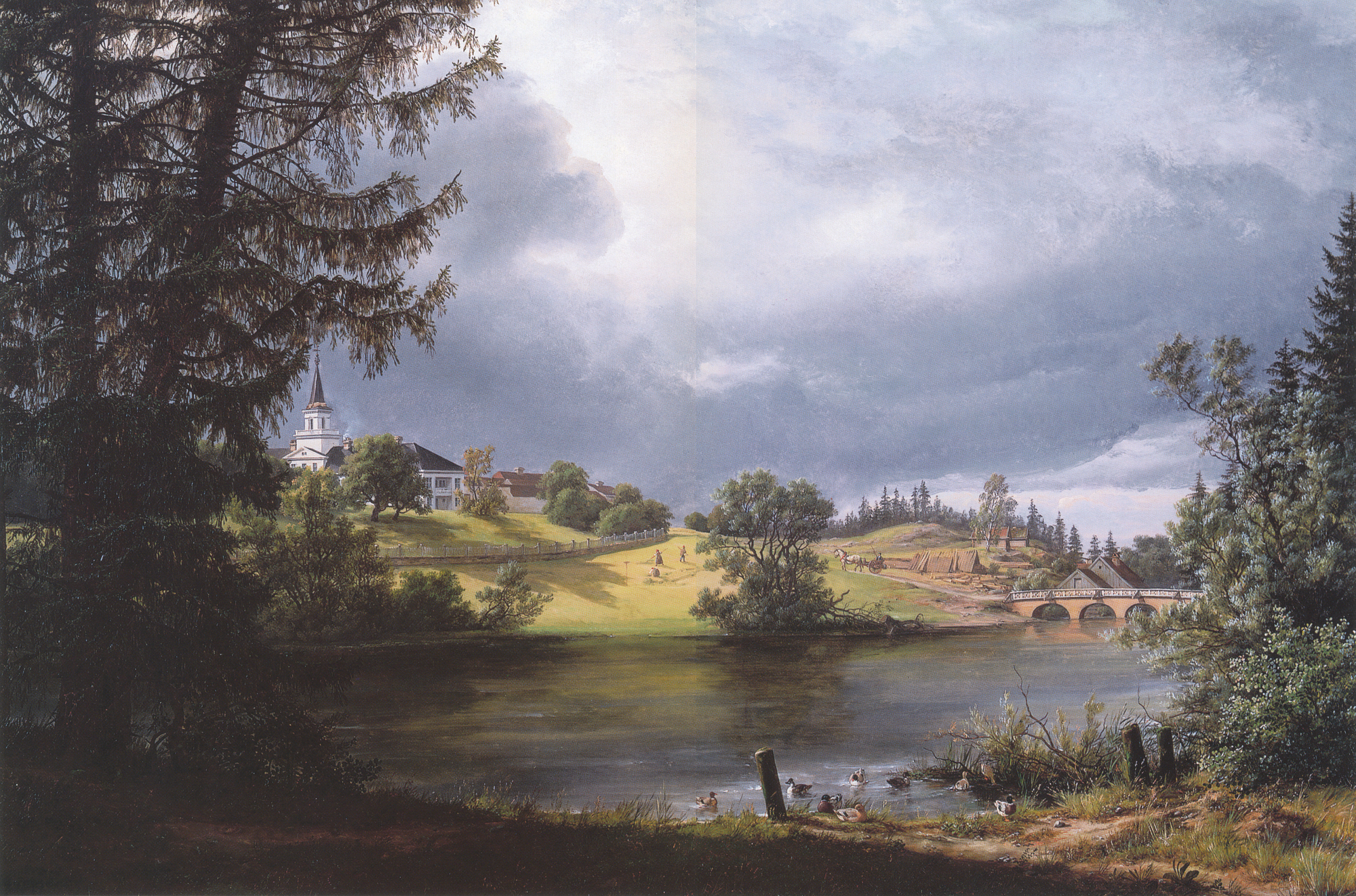
Frogner Manor (1842) by J.C. Dahl, for Benjamin Wegner

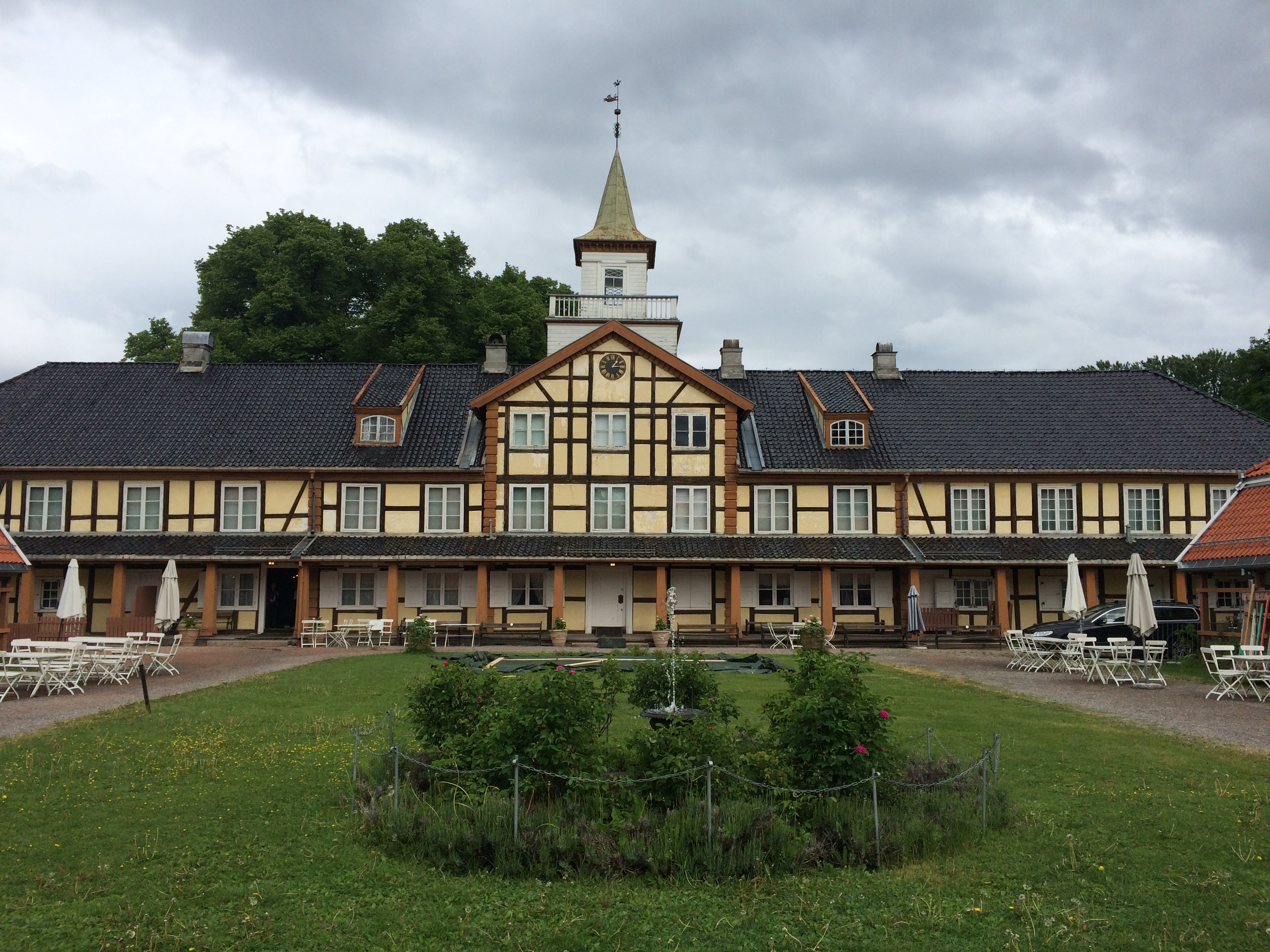
Frogner Manor

Frogner Manor (Frogner Hovedgård) is a manor house and former estate in today's borough of Frogner in Oslo, Norway. The estate comprised most of the modern borough of Frogner, which has been named after the estate, and Frognerseteren with parts of the Nordmarka forest (Frognerseterskogen). The remaining part of the estate is now the site of the Frogner Park, with the manor house found in the south of the park and the Vigeland installation in the park's centre. The 18th century buildings on the grounds now house the Oslo City Museum.

Frogner was one of the largest and oldest agricultural properties in the Oslo area. In the Middle Ages, Frogner became ecclesiastical property, mostly owned by the Hovedøya Abbey, but was confiscated by the Crown in 1532, preceding the Reformation. From the mid 17th century to the late 19th century it was owned by wealthy officials or burghers of Christiania, then sold to the municipality of Kristiania in 1896 to make room for urban expansion and a new cemetery (Vestre gravlund). Significant parts of the estate instead became a public park.

== History ==
Frogner Manor was built in 1750 by Major Hans Jacob Scheel (1714–1774), the first owner to make Frogner his permanent residence. He erected four wings around a square courtyard, accessed through a porte-cochère in the south wing. His residence opposite was a log house, still intact as the middle section of the present main building. Behind it, a Baroque garden was laid out, its axis parallel to the main building. Scheel's log house was probably intended for a farm manager, and his plan may have been to build a more monumental residence as the focal point of the garden, symmetrical to its axis, and with a splendid view to the Frogner lake on the opposite side. However, his finances were overextend, and he had to postpone this plan, and instead convert the log house to a more representative manor. He added a timber-framed extension to the west to complete the symmetry, and a central wall dormer, in front of a grand reception room in the attic. Scheel completed the transformation by covering the log walls behind timber-framing with brick infill, all finished with white-washed plaster, looking like masonry. In 1760 Scheels was nearly broke and had to sell his manor.

In 1790 the estate was bought by timber merchant and shipowner Bernt Anker (1746–1805), Norway's richest person at the time. He and his wife Mathia inhabited his family's town house during winter, and used Frogner as their summer residence. They entertained extensively and invited the wealthy elite of Christiania to assemblés every week. In order to accommodate guests indoors on rainy days, they needed a large banquet hall. They fit it into an extension to the main building eastward, and to preserve symmetry they extended the building equally far westwards, to its present length of 54 metres. Among many foreign visitors Thomas Malthus enjoyed dancing in the ballroom in 1799

Bernt Anker died a childless widower in 1805. Frogner was bought by his nephew Morten Anker in 1807. His business was hard hit by the economic depression during and after the Napoleonic wars, and he eventually went bankrupt and was forced to sell Frogner by auction in 1836. The buyer was the director-general of the Modum Blue Colour Works, Benjamin Wegner, who was married to Henriette Seyler of the Hamburg Berenberg banking dynasty. They demolished the southern wing of the manor and opened the courtyard. The turret above the porte-cochère was dismantled and rebuilt on the roof of the main building during their time as owners. The Wegners, in their turn, went through economic problems during the financial crisis of 1848 and had to sell Frogner by auction.

In 1848 Fredrik Georg Gade (1807–1859), a wealthy merchant from Bergen, purchased the manor. His heirs held the property in joint ownership, under the management of his son Gerhard Gade (1839–1909). He was married to an American, Hellen Allyne, and was the United States consul in Christiania. The former U.S. president and general Ulysses S. Grant visited Kristiania in the summer of 1878, and attended a gala dinner at Frogner with his entourage.

Major parts of the farmland belonging to the manor was sold and built up through the end of the 19th century as the city expanded, but around one square kilometer remained when the city of Oslo bought the property in 1896 to secure space for further urban development and a new cemetery. The last private owner, Gerhard Gade, retained the right to inhabit the house until his death in 1909. This spared the house from demolition, and an economic recession prevented further building on the land.

In the meantime, the house was recognised as an important cultural monument. It was restored and placed at the disposal of the Oslo City Museum.

== Oslo City Museum ==
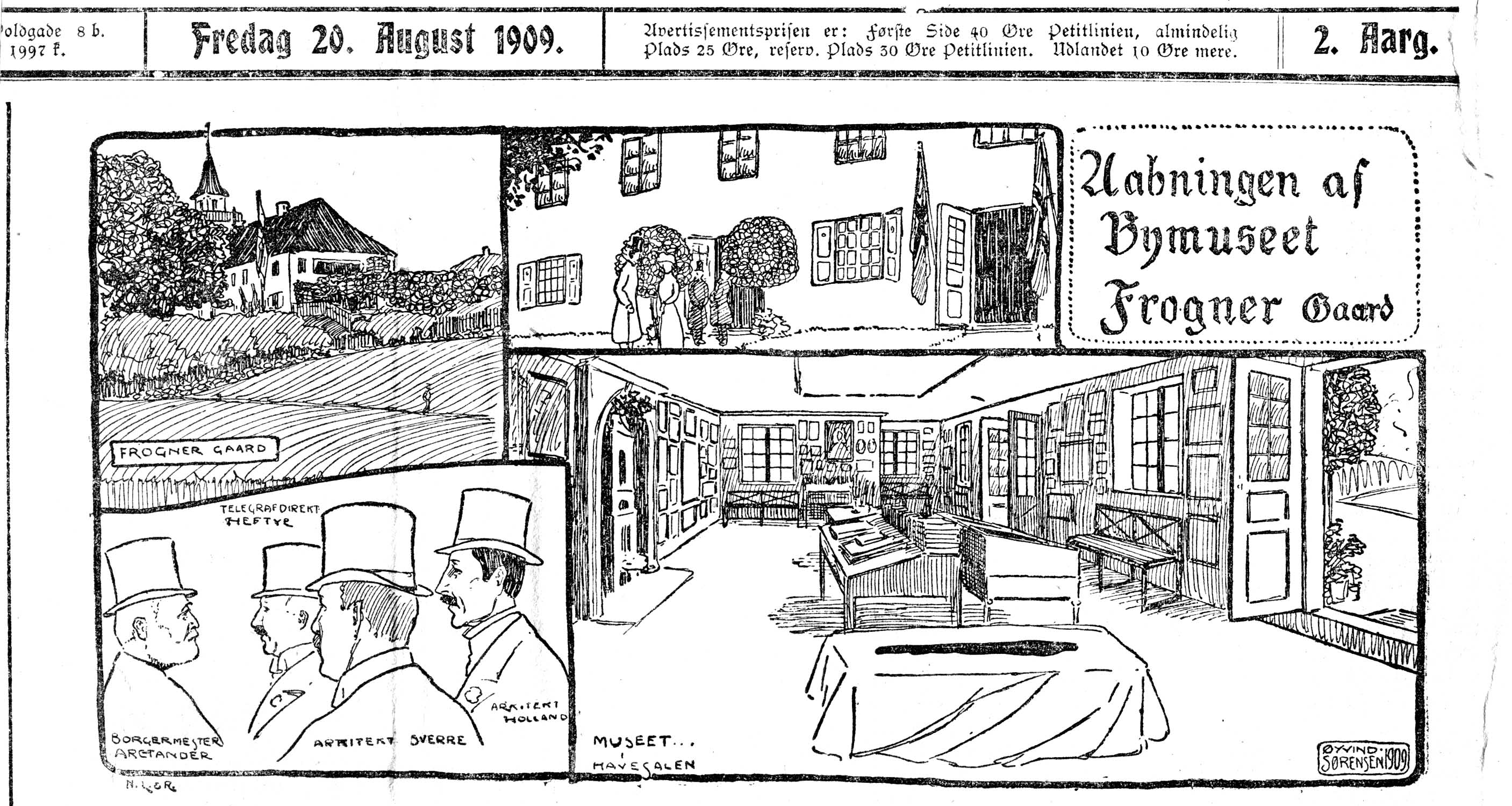
The opening of the Oslo City Museum at the Frogner Manor's main building in 1909. Reportage image by Øyvind Sørensen in Aftenposten.

In the main house at the Frogner Manor, the local historical museum of the City of Oslo is located. The museum gives an impression of the capital city's historical development.

== Frogner Park ==
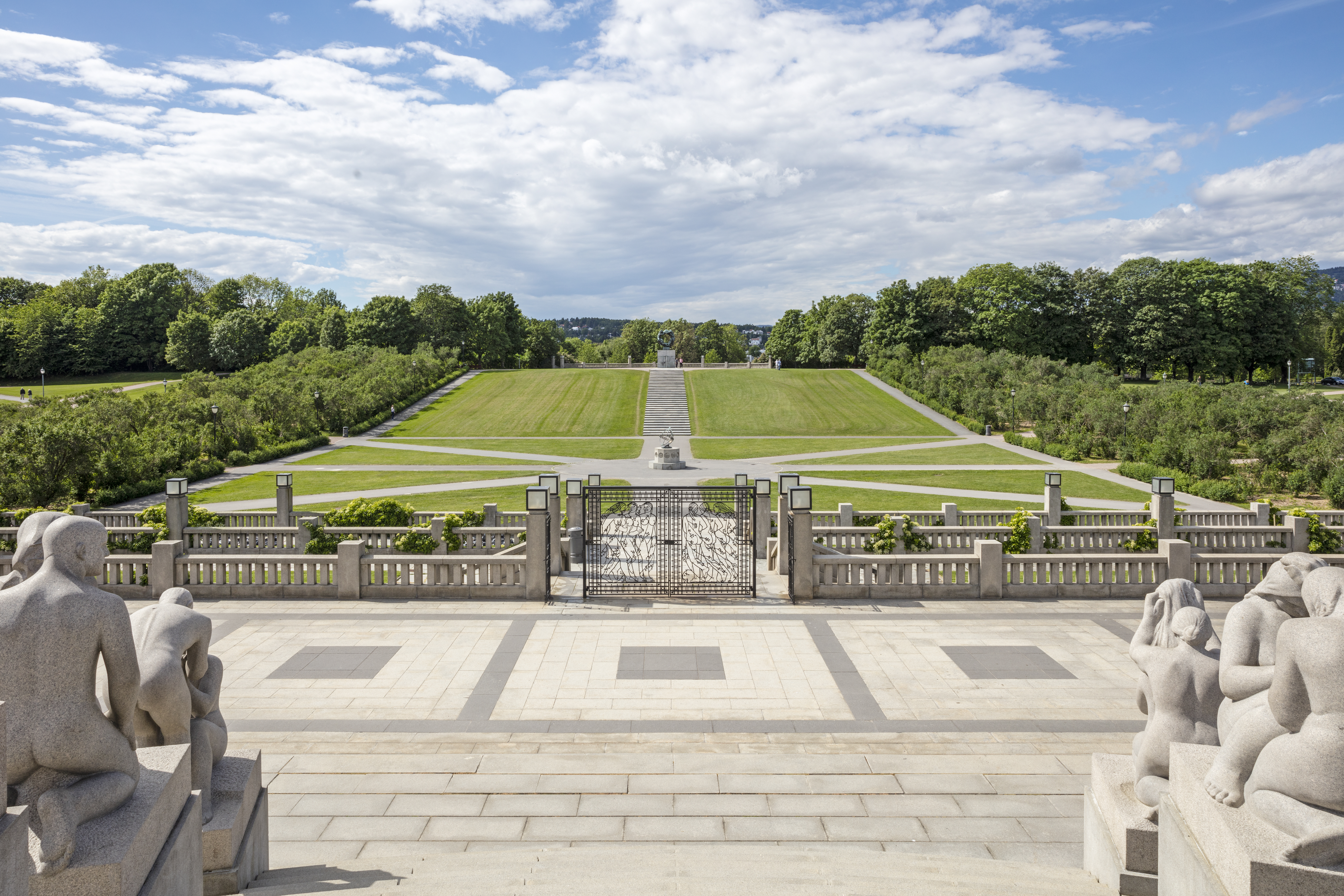
Part of Frogner Park (2016)

The private garden surrounding the manor house was historically much smaller. After Oslo municipality acquired the estate, much of the remaining agricultural land was turned into a public park, the Frogner Park, with Gustav Vigeland's sculpture arrangement (Vigelandsanlegget or the Vigeland installation) erected in the centre from 1928 to 1943. In 1914 the area was the site of the 1914 Jubilee Exhibition.

On the outskirts of Frogner Park is Frognerbadet (Frogner Baths), which opened in 1956. Old Frogner Stadium opened in 1901 and was the city's main arena for skating. In 1914 the current Frogner Stadium was built right next to the old stadium. At the site of the old Frogner Stadium, there are now tennis courts.

== Frognerseteren ==
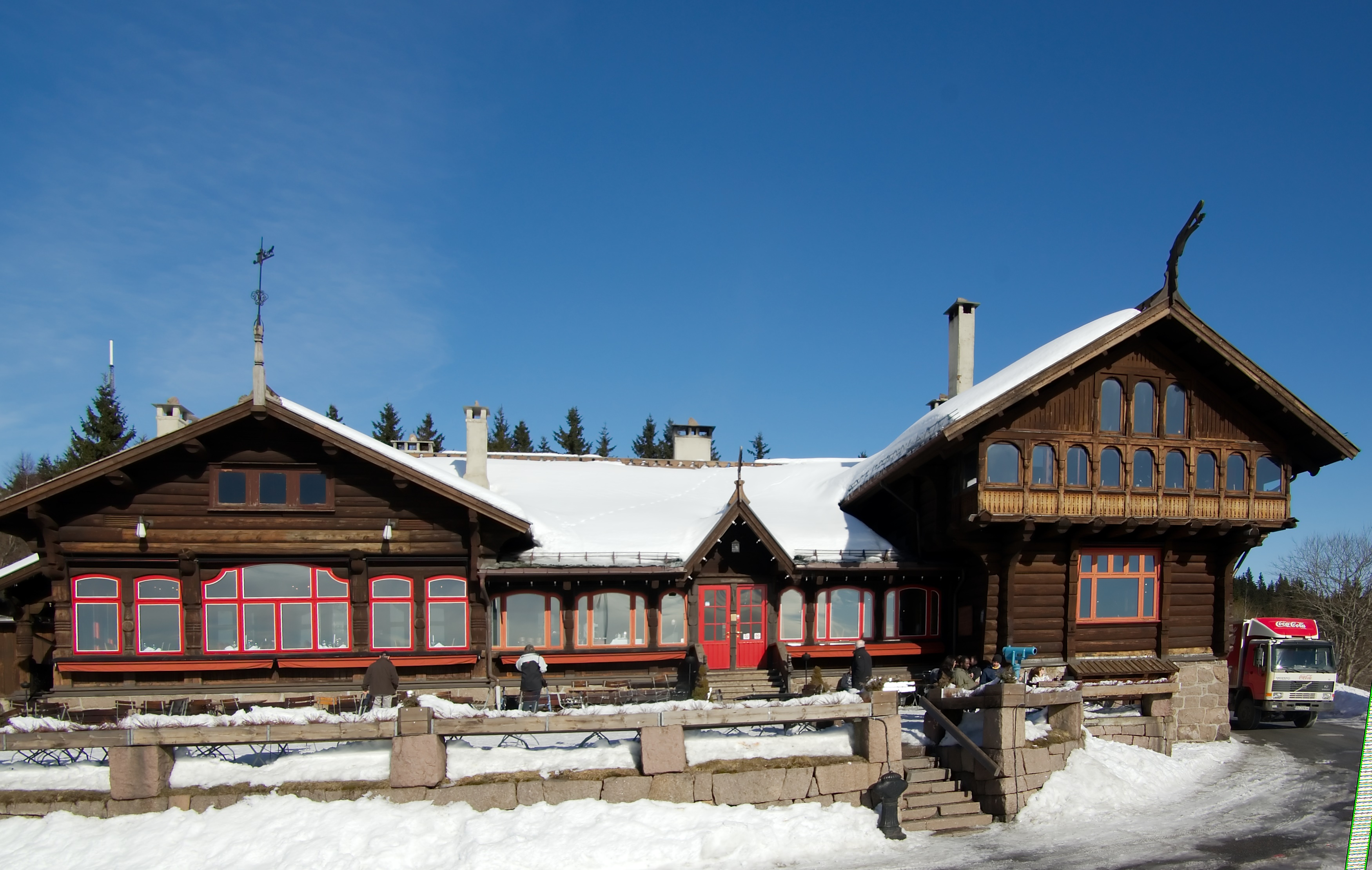
The current restaurant at Frognerseteren

The seter (mountain dairy farm) of Frogner was situated near the summit of the Holmenkollen hill north of Oslo, and included parts of the Nordmarka forest. The name is still preserved in the terminal Frognerseteren station of the suburban Holmenkoll Line, opened in 1898 and extended in 1916. Frognerseteren and the forest was split from Frogner Manor when Benjamin Wegner sold the manor but kept Frognerseteren in 1848. Wegner's heirs sold it to Thomas Johannessen Heftye in 1864, and his heirs sold it to the municipality in 1889, thus making it the first forest owned by Oslo municipality.

== Etymology ==
The Norse form of the name was Fraunar (plural form). The name is probably derived from the word frauð 'manure' - and then with the meaning 'fertilized fields'.

See also Frogn and Tøyen).

== People ==
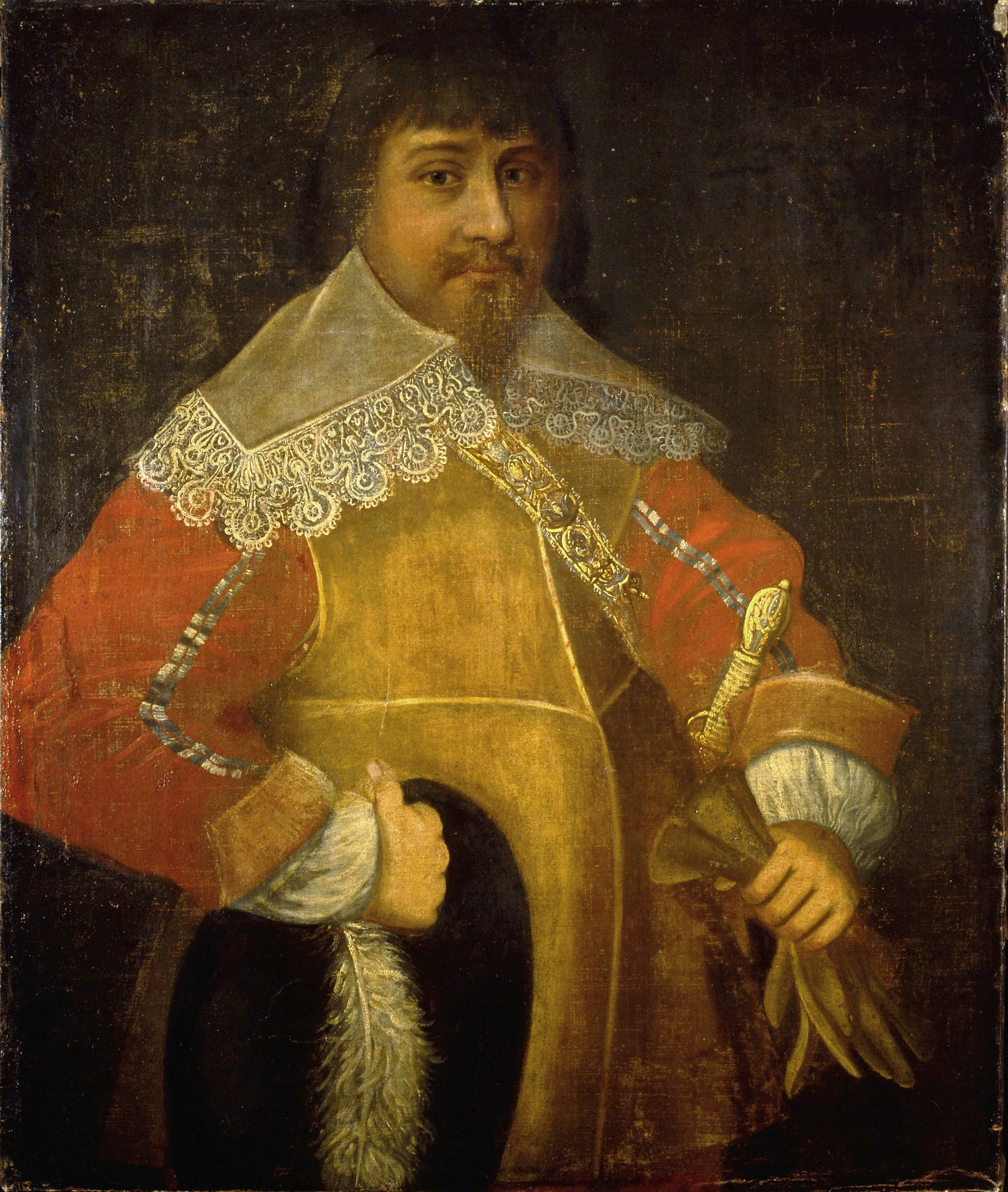
Selius Marselis (1600-1663)

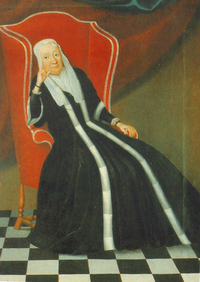
Karen Toller, married Hausmann, (1662-1744)

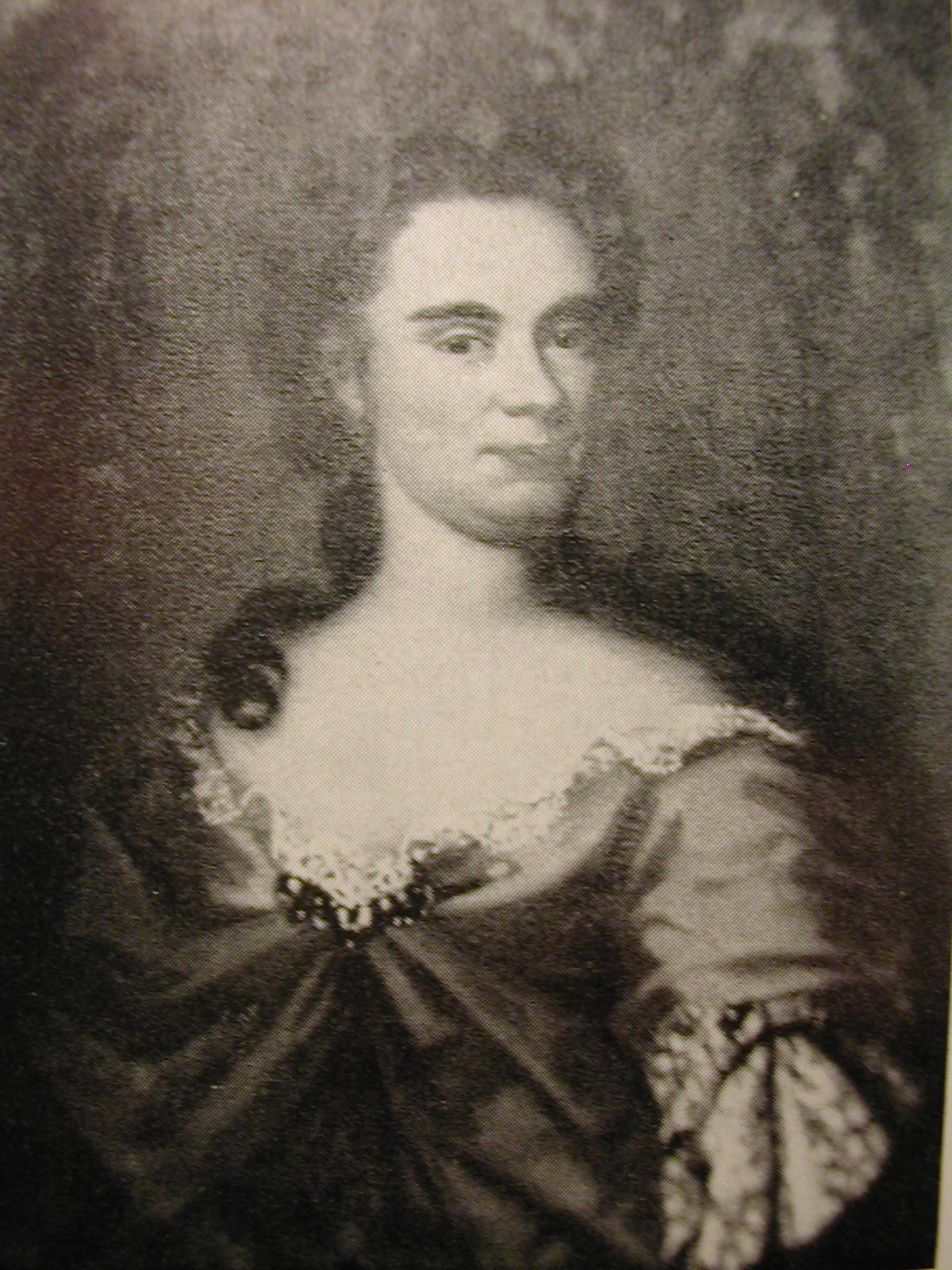
Anne Cathrine Toller, married Tritzschler and Garmann

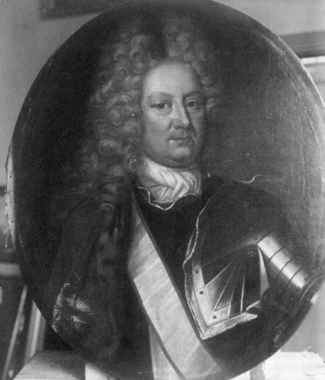
Caspar Herman Hausmann

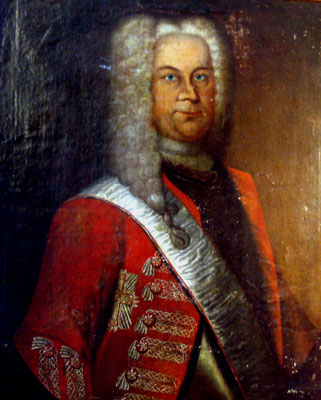
Hans Ernst von Tritzschler (1647-1718)

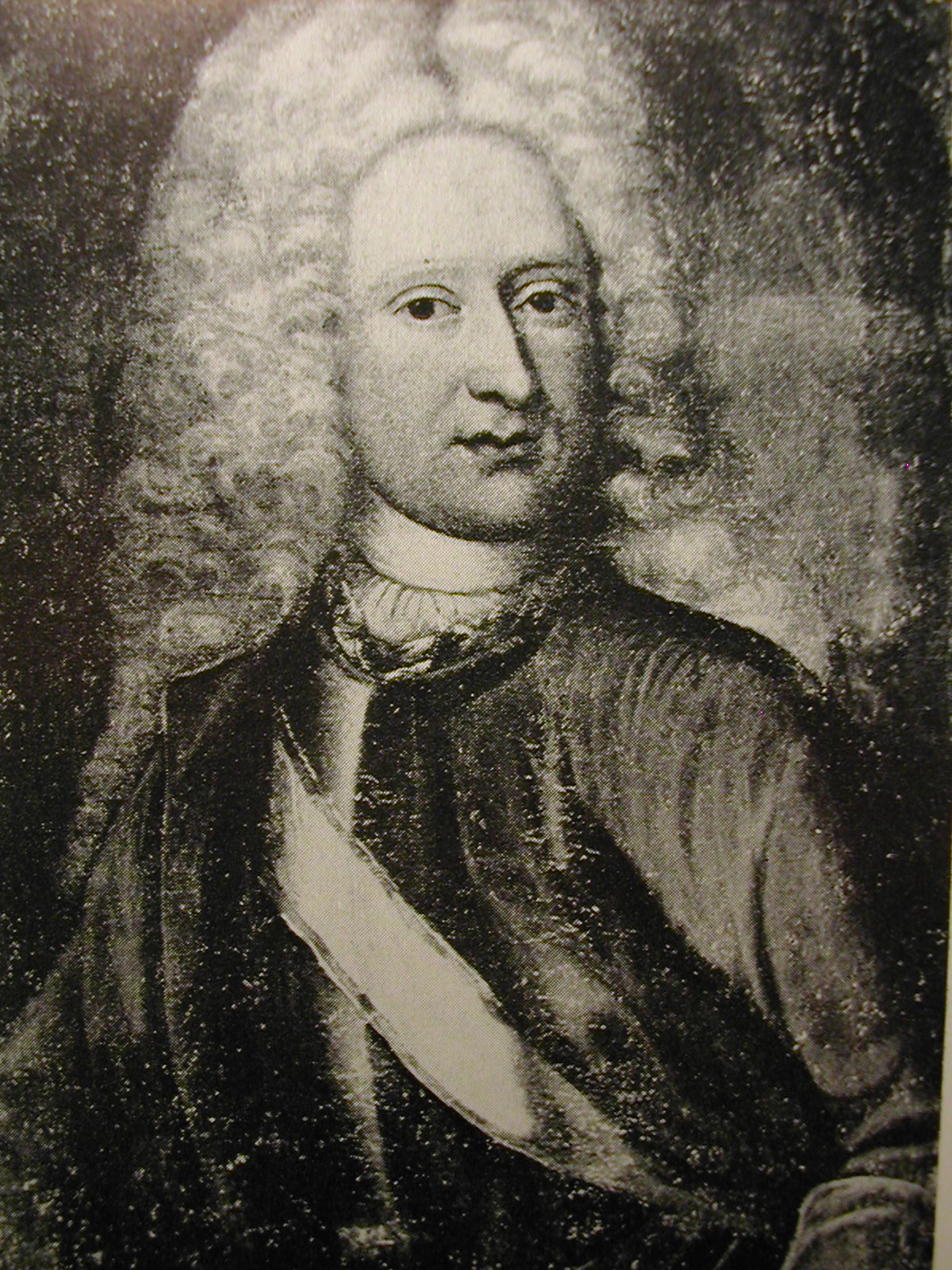
Ulrik Frederik de Cicignon (1698-1772)

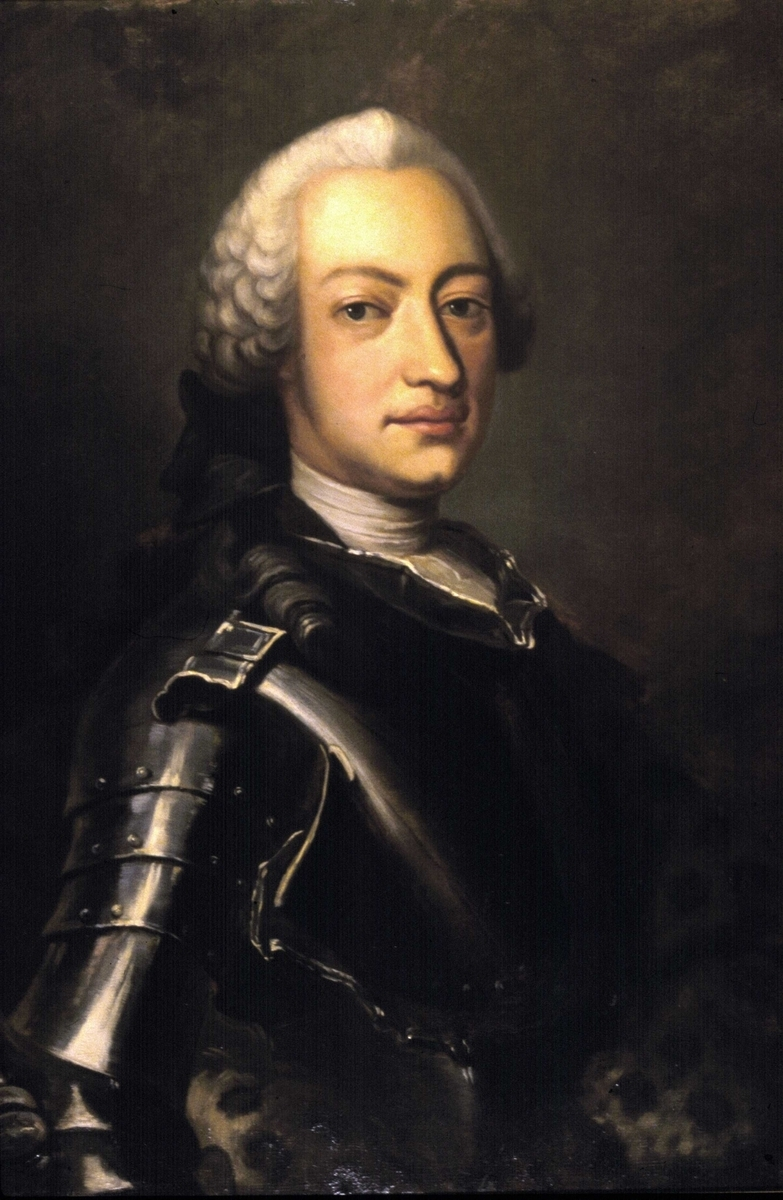
Hans Jacob Scheel (1714–1774)

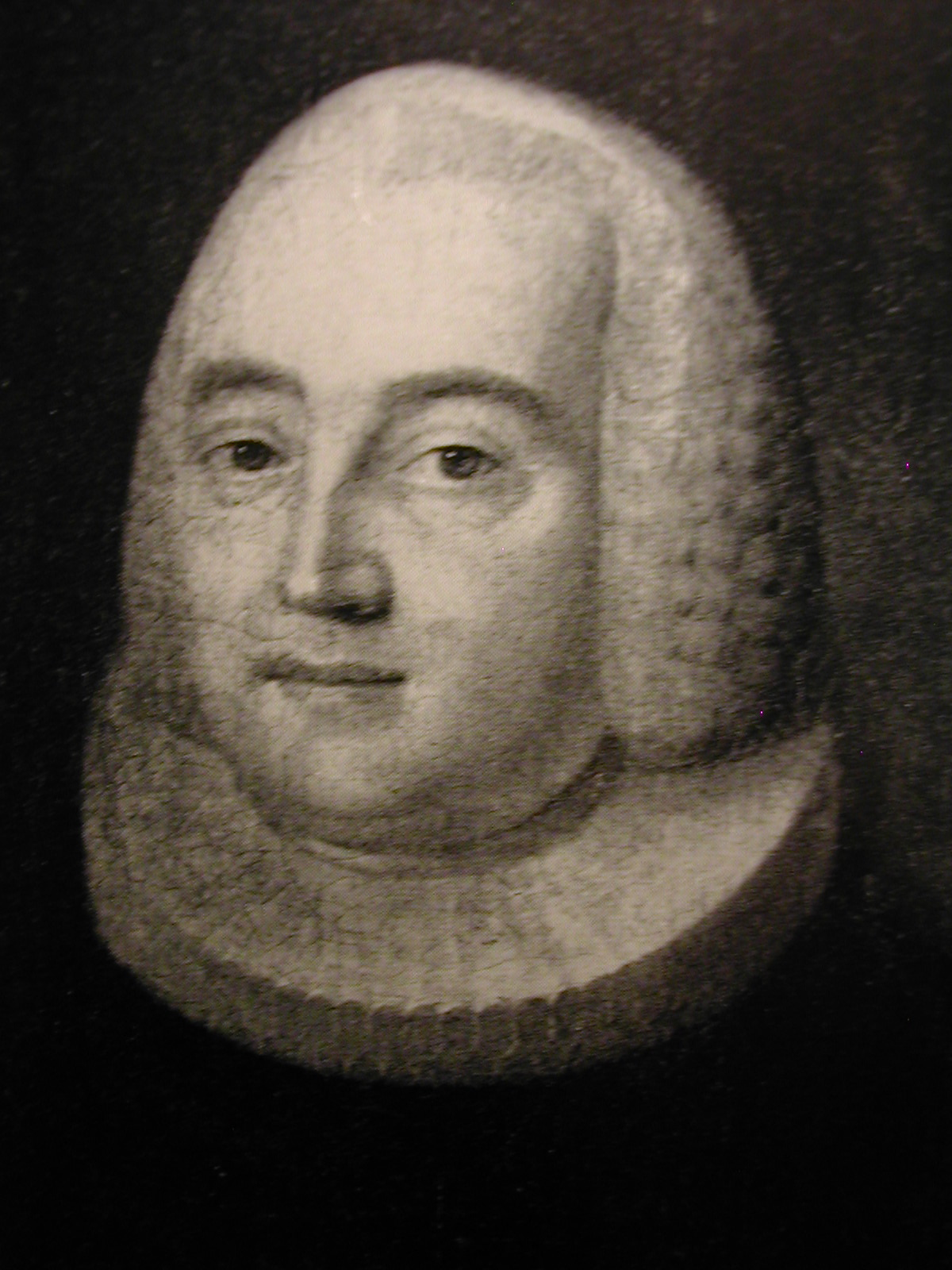
Bernt Ancher Sverdrup (1734–1809)

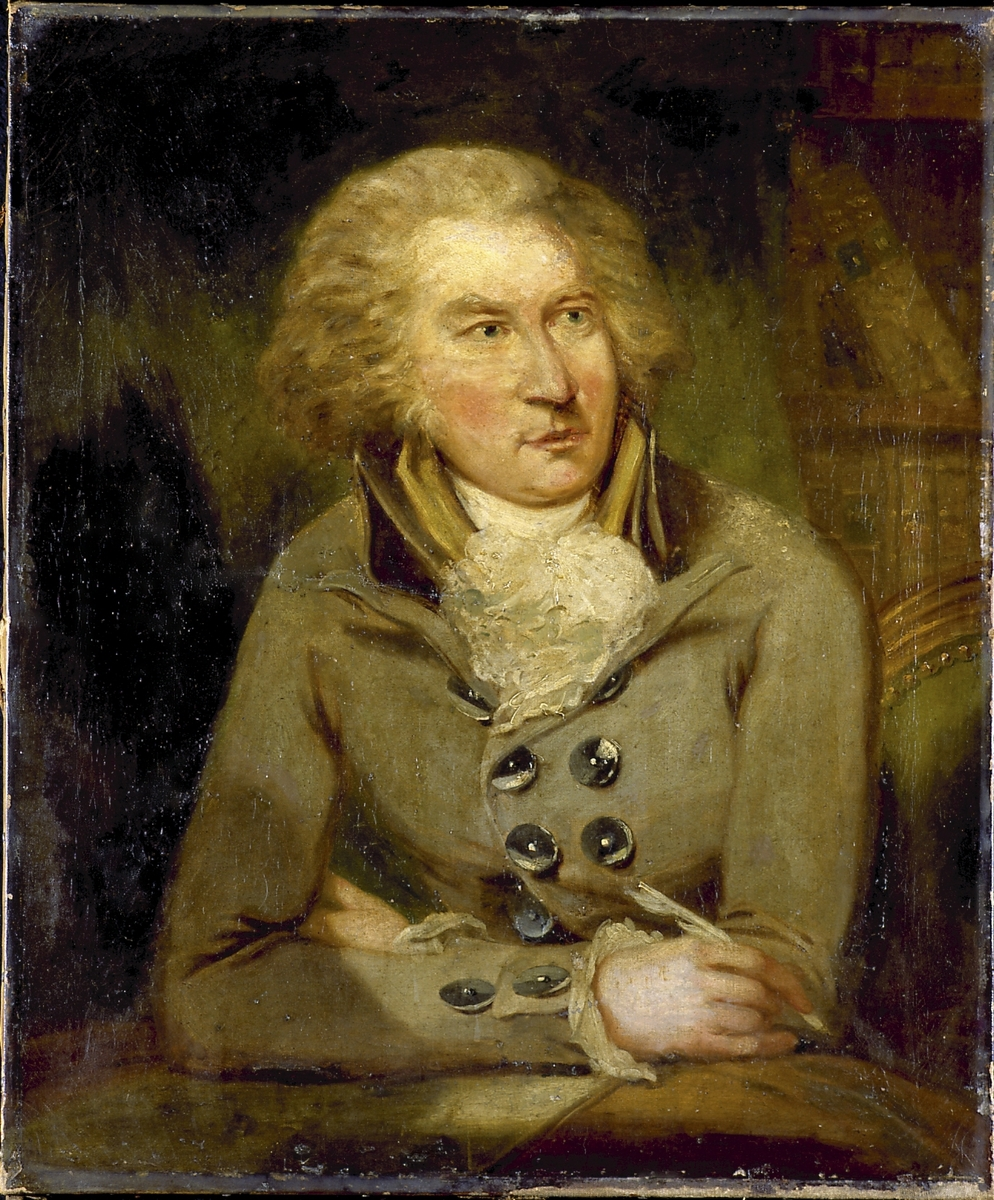
Bernt Anker (1746-1805)

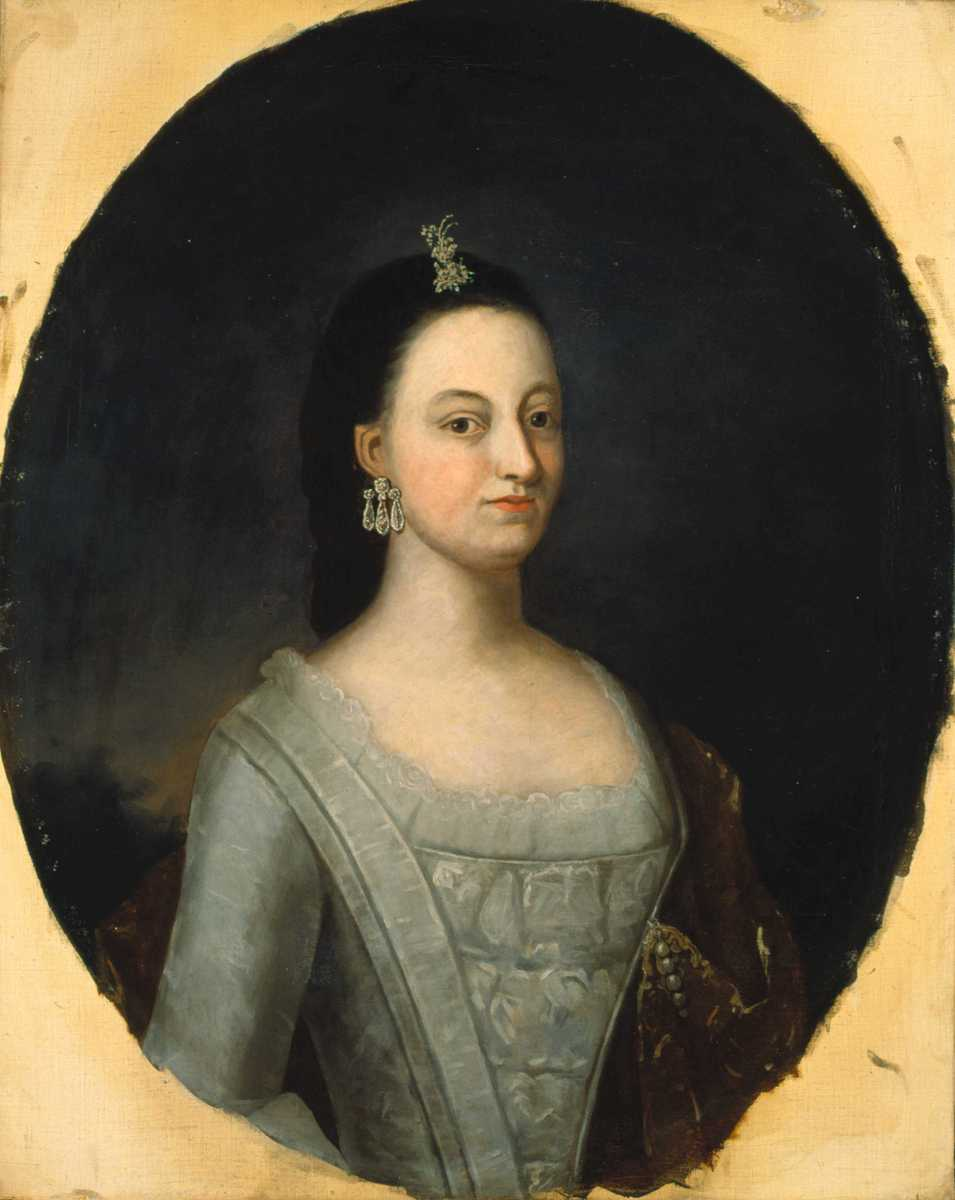
Mathia Anker (1737–1801), née Collett, wife of Bernt Anker

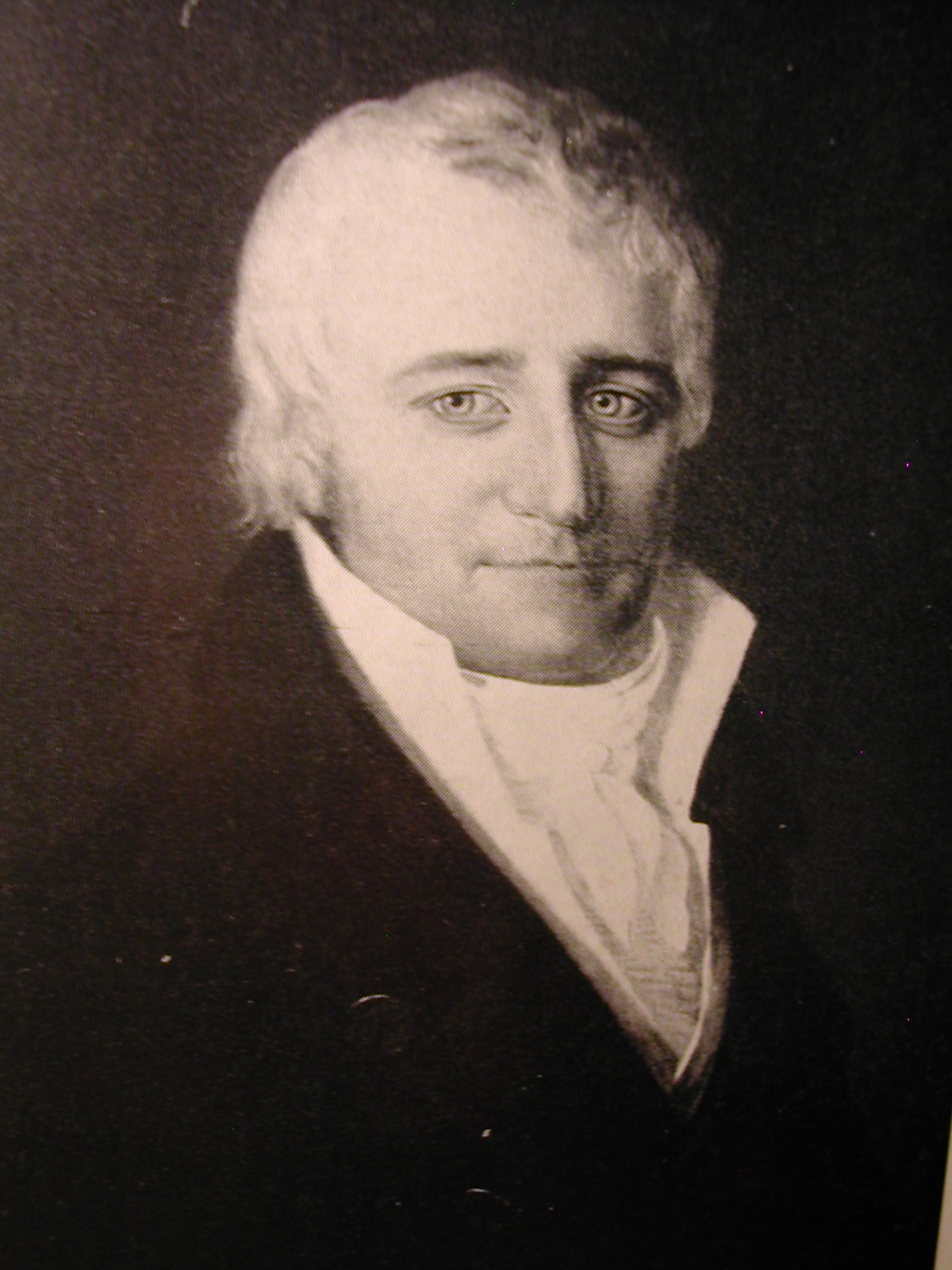
Morten Anker (1780–1838)

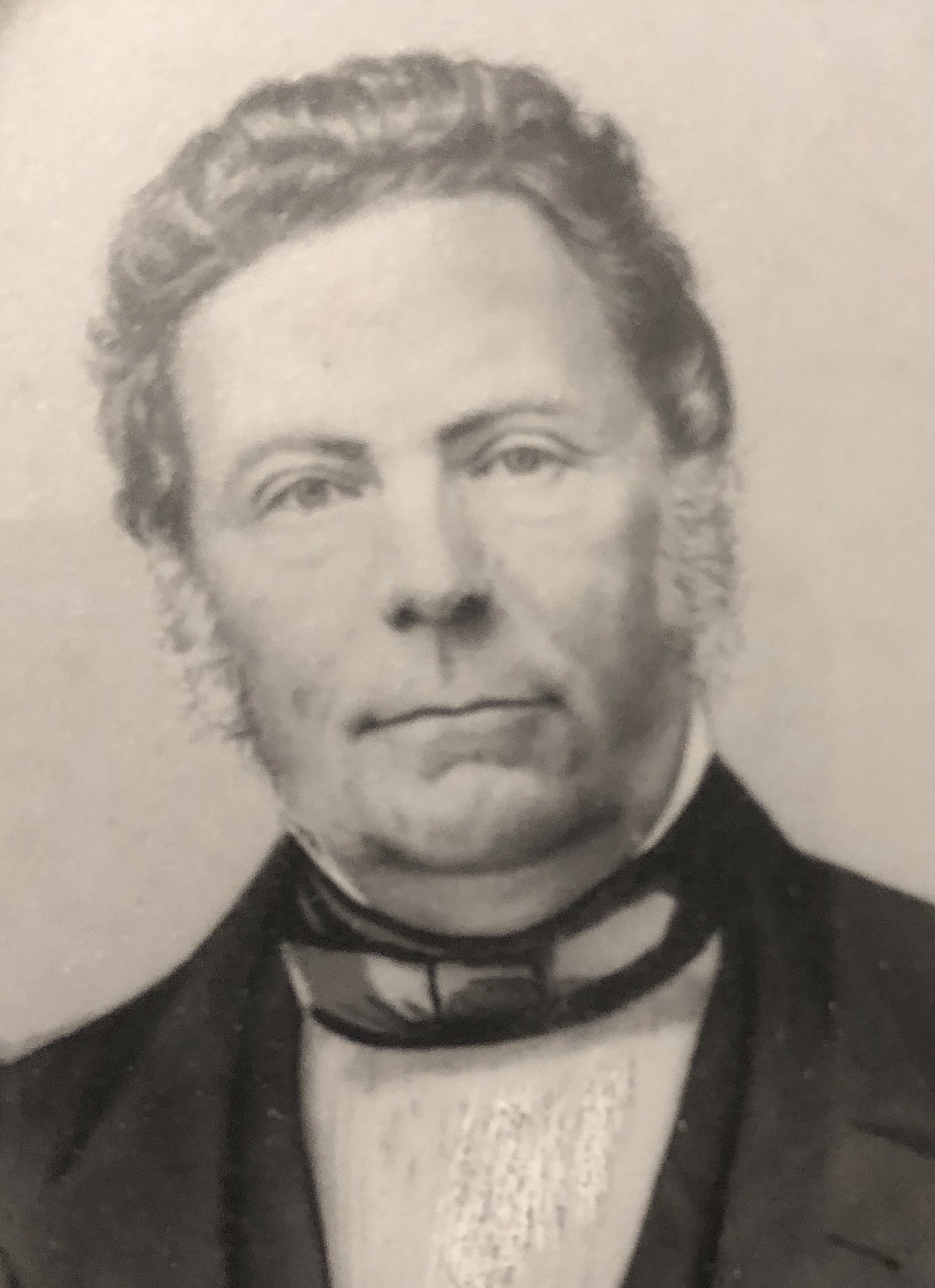
Benjamin Wegner (1795-1864)

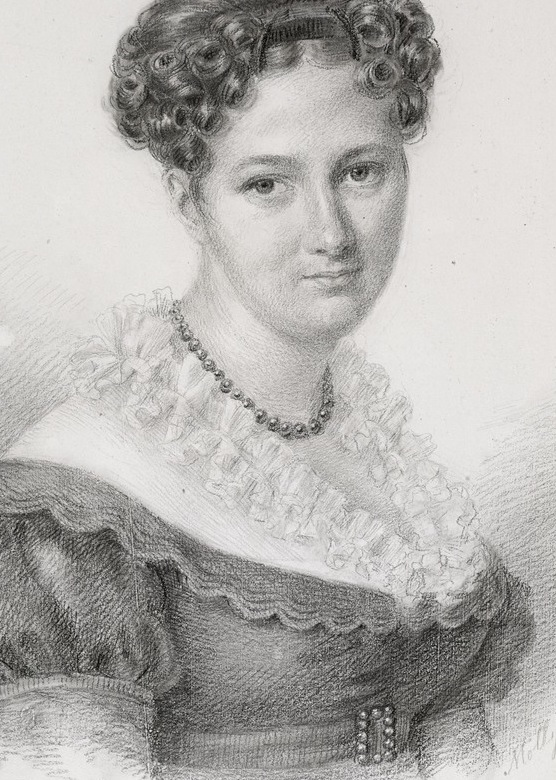
Henriette Wegner (1805–1875), née Seyler, wife of Benjamin Wegner

== Other sources ==
- Roede, Lars (2012) Frogner hovedgård. Bondegård, herskapsgård, byens gård (Oslo: Pax Forlag)
- Magnussen, Kjeld (1967) Gaarden Store Frogner (Oslo: Bymuseum)
- Gade, Ingeborg (1921) Stamtavle over slegterne Gade og Wallem (Kristiania: Det Mallingske Bogtrykkeri)
- Gade, John A. (1942) All My Born Days. Experiences of a Naval Intelligence Officer in Europe (New York, Charles Scribner's Sons)
- Wegner, R. B.(1963) Familien Wegner (Halden)
