= Hans Finne-Grønn =

Norwegian painter (1903–2001)

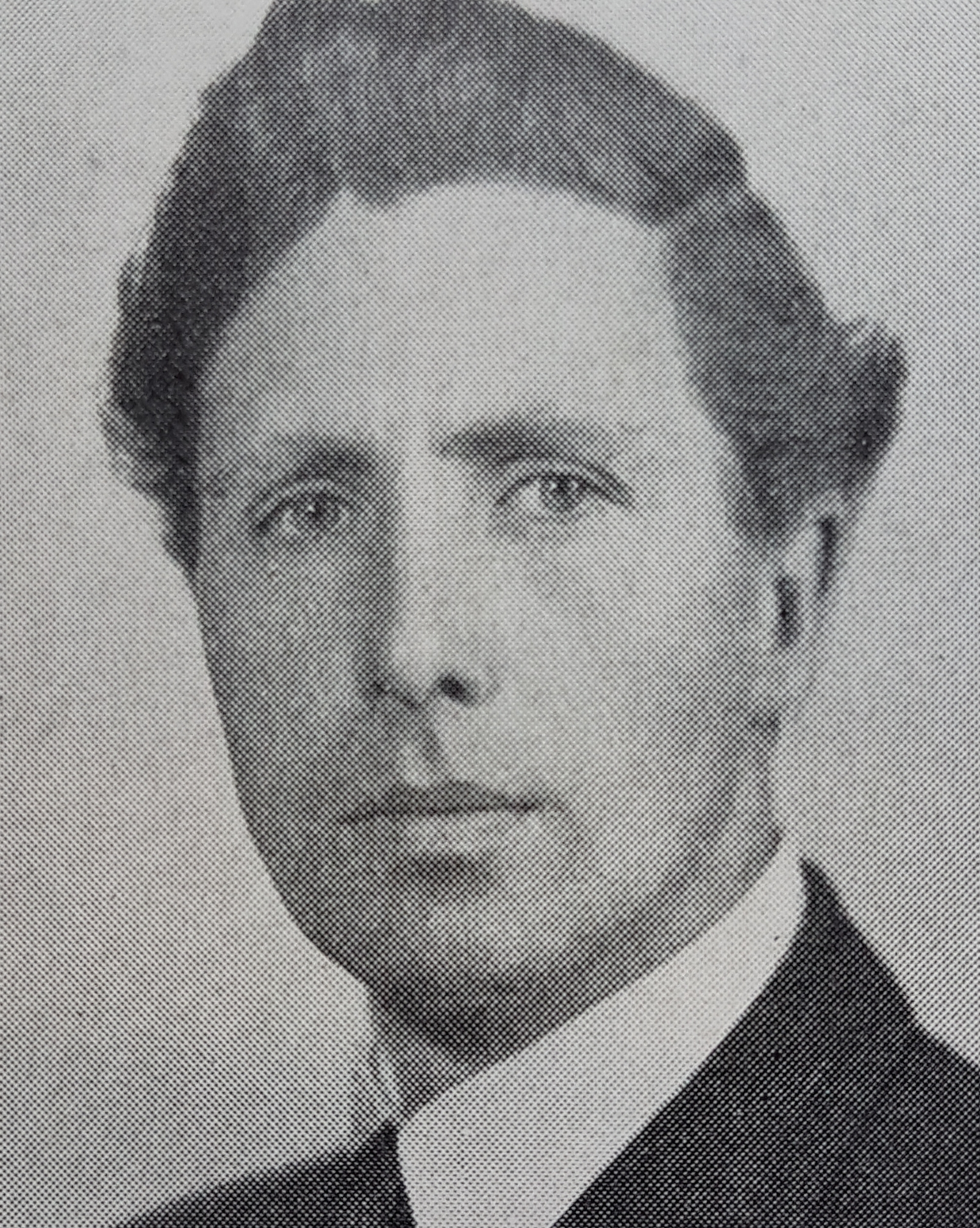

Hans Fredrik Leganger Finne-Grønn (25 September 1903 – 9 March 2001) was a Norwegian painter.

== Biography ==
He was born in Kristiania as a son of lawyer and museum director Stian Herlofsen Finne-Grønn (1869–1953) and Margrethe Borchgrevink (1873–1963). He was a brother of ambassador Jørgen Finne-Grønn (1905–1998). His grandmother Sofie Borchgrevink (1846–1911) was principal at Kristiania kvinnelige industriskole. In 1931 he married Liv Friis Holler.

He attended Norwegian National Academy of Craft and Art Industry, then several academies in Paris, France, then the Norwegian National Academy of Fine Arts from 1925 to 1928. He made his debut in 1934 and made a career as a portrait painter. The most prominent people portrayed by Finne-Grønn include Haakon VII of Norway (displayed several places, including Skaugum and the Royal Palace, Oslo) and President of the Storting Gustav Natvig Pedersen (displayed in the Parliament of Norway).

He died in March 2001 and was buried at Ris, Oslo. Several portraits of business leaders are displayed in Oslo Stock Exchange. The work Kveld på Brunlanes is owned by the National Gallery of Norway.
