= Sofie Borchgrevink =

Norwegian educator (1846–1911)

- Born: Sofie Augusta Pauline Klouman; 26 September 1846; Christiania, Norway
- Died: 5 December 1911 (aged 65); Kristiania
- Occupation: Educator
- Relatives: Stian Finne-Grønn (son-in-law)
- Awards: King's Medal of Merit

Sofie Augusta Pauline Borchgrevink (26 September 1846 – 5 December 1911) was a Norwegian educator.

== Personal life ==
Born in Christiania on 26 September 1846, Borchgrevink was a daughter of Major General Fredrik Laurentius Klouman and Wilhelmine Kristine Juell. In 1869 she married Hans Fredrik Leganger Borchgrevink. Their daughter Margrethe married museologist Stian Finne-Grønn.

== Career ==
Borchgrevink graduated from teachers' college in 1878, and worked as a teacher at Gjertsens Skole in Kristiania. She served as principal at Kristiania kvinnelige industriskole from 1888 to 1911. Taking part in local politics, she was elected member of the city council of Kristiania for the period 1902 to 1905.

She was a board member of Den norske Husflidsforening from 1898 to 1911, and of the Norwegian Museum of Decorative Arts and Design from 1902 to 1911. Borchgrevink died in Kristiania on 5 December 1911.
