= Oslo City Museum =

Museum in Oslo, Norway

Coordinates: 59°55′27.41″N 10°42′10.98″E

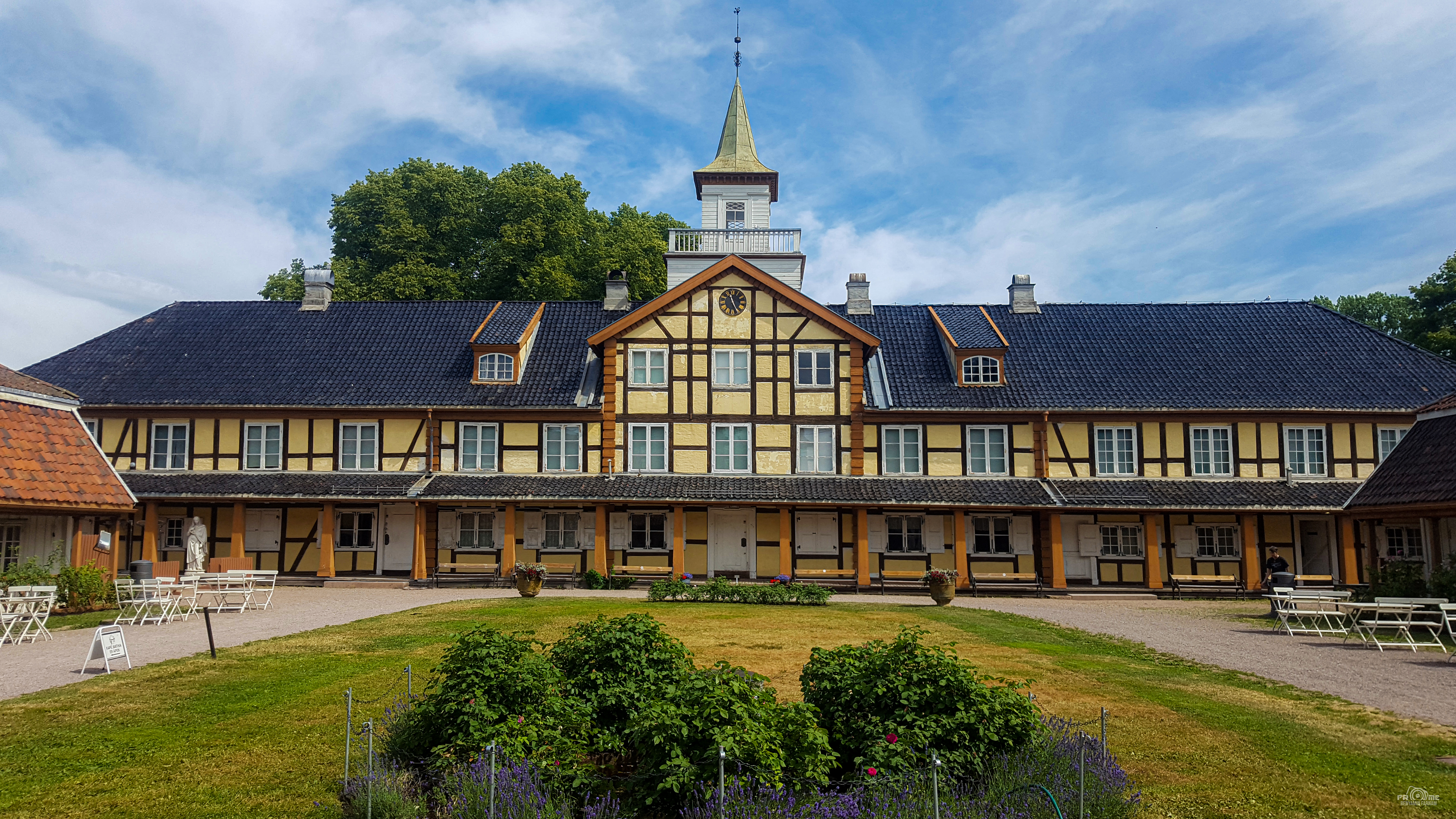
Frogner Manor

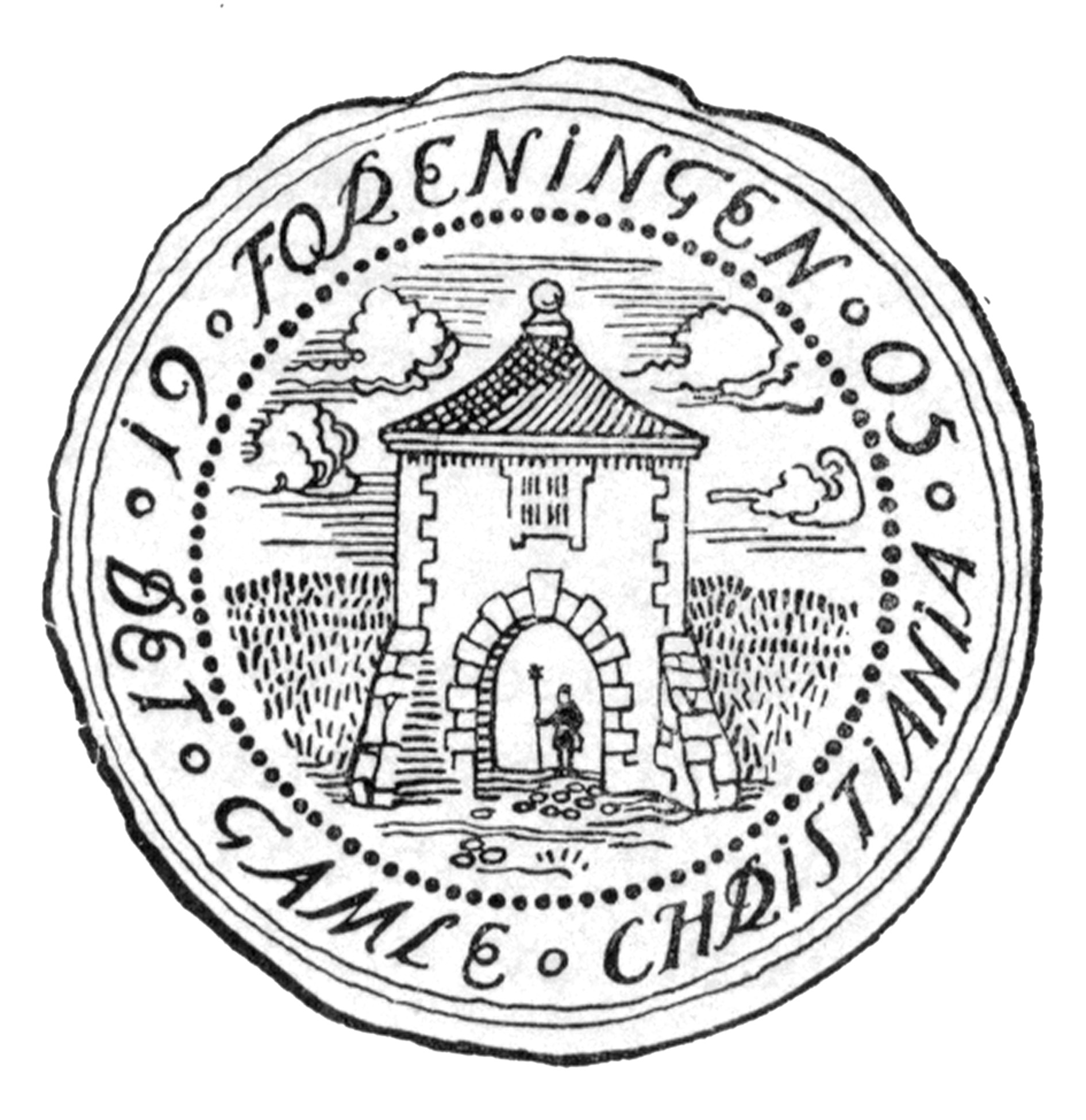
Det gamle Christiania seal drawn by Fritz Holland

Oslo City Museum (Oslo Bymuseum) is a department of Oslo Museum in Oslo, Norway since 2006. The museum is located at Frogner Manor (Frogner Hovedgård) in Frogner Park (Frognerparken).

The museum was first founded in 1905 as the association Det gamle Christiania. Initiator and committee leader until 1912 was architect Fritz Holland (1874-1959). A committee members included Bishop of Oslo Anton Christian Bang, architects Torolf Prytz and Harald Olsen, artist Eilif Peterssen and military officer Thomas Heftye. The museum moved into the main building at Frogner Manor in 1909.

Oslo City Museum was a private association until the end of 2005. In 2006 it became part of the newly established Oslo Museum, together with two other museums; the Intercultural Museum and the Theatre Museum. Oslo Museum is now headquartered at Frogner Manor.

Oslo City Museum has an extensive library with the purpose of documenting the history of the City of Oslo, as well as the former municipality Aker. Particularly valuable is the museum's art collection and photo collection with Oslo motifs and portraits. The museum has one of the largest and most important photo collections in Norway. Additionally the museum has an art collection which contains around 1,000 paintings and around 6,000 other works.
