= Stian Finne-Grønn =

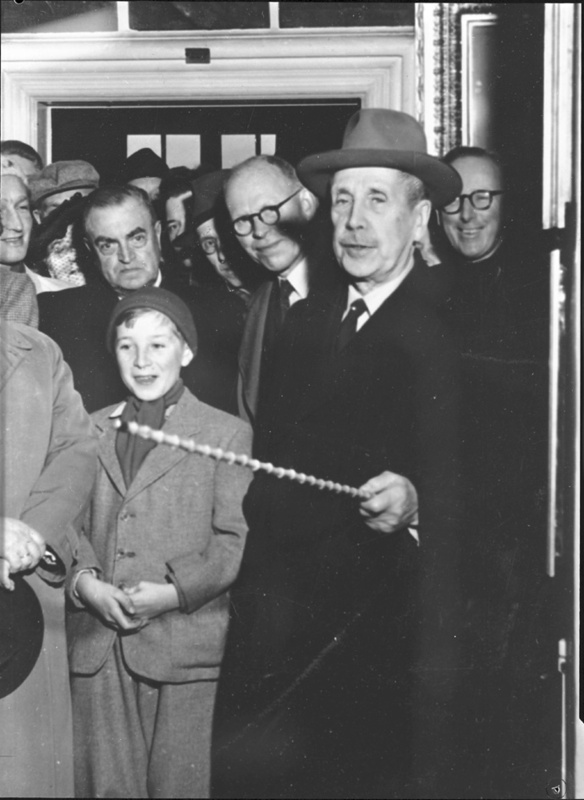
Stian Herlofsen Finne-Grønn, ca. 1950

Stian Herlofsen "S. H." Finne-Grønn (31 August 1869 – 1 November 1963) was a Norwegian lawyer, archivist, genealogist and museum director. He was widely regarded as Norway's preeminent genealogist of the 20th century. He founded and chaired the Norwegian Genealogical Society and edited the main Norwegian journals of genealogy and personal history, Norsk Personalhistorisk Tidsskrift and Norsk Slektshistorisk Tidsskrift. He served as director of Oslo Museum and as the archivist of Oslo Municipality.

== Biography ==
He was born in the town of Risør in Aust-Agder, Norway. He was the son of engineer Samuel Grønn (1838–1898) and Jacobine Finne (1845–1912). In October 1900 he married Margrethe Borchgrevink (1873–1963), a daughter of Sofie Borchgrevink. They had the sons Hans Finne-Grønn, a painter, and Jørgen Finne-Grønn, an ambassador.

He attended the Royal Drafting School (Den Kongelige Tegneskole) in Christiania (now Oslo) graduating examen artium in 1888. He worked as an assistant architect in Christianssand for several years. He graduated cand.jur. from Det Kongelige Frederiks Universitet (now University of Oslo) in 1899. He was a secretary in Statistics Norway from 1900 to 1907, then worked in the National Archival Services of Norway from 1907 to 1914. From 1914 to 1939 he worked in the archival services of the city of Oslo. He also had an early involvement with what is today known as Oslo City Museum, which developed from the organization Foreningen Det gamle Christiania in 1905. He became curator of this organization in 1912, and was the director from 1920 to 1949.

His first genealogical work was about lineages in his native Risør, and was published in several volumes between 1895 and 1901. In 1906 he created the periodical Norsk tidsskrift for genealogi, personalhistorie, biografi og litteraturhistorie, which was Norway's first periodical on genealogy. Editors were Finne-Grønn, Erik Andreas Thomle and Christoffer Morgenstierne Munthe. Norway did not have a national genealogical society, rather there was a Dano-Norwegian organization Samfundet for dansk-norsk Genealogi og Personalhistorie. Finne-Grønn chaired the Norwegian branch from 1919 to 1920. In 1926 Finne-Grønn founded the Norwegian Genealogical Society together with Munthe and Sigurd Segelcke Meidell, among others. He was the first chairman from 1926 to 1929, and as the organization launched a new periodical Norsk Slektshistorisk Tidsskrift, Finne-Grønn edited it from 1926 to 1936 and from 1947 until his death in 1963.

Finne-Grønn was decorated as a Knight, First Class of the Order of St. Olav in 1945. In 1942, he was created an honorary member of the Norwegian Genealogical Society and the Genealogical Society of Finland. A festschrift was issued in his honor at the time of his seventy-fifth birthday in 1944. He died in Oslo in 1963, aged 94, and was buried at Vestre gravlund.

Cultural offices
Preceded by position created	Chairman of the Norwegian Genealogical Society; 1926–1929	Succeeded by Halvdan Koht
