= Frogner Church =

- Frogner kirke
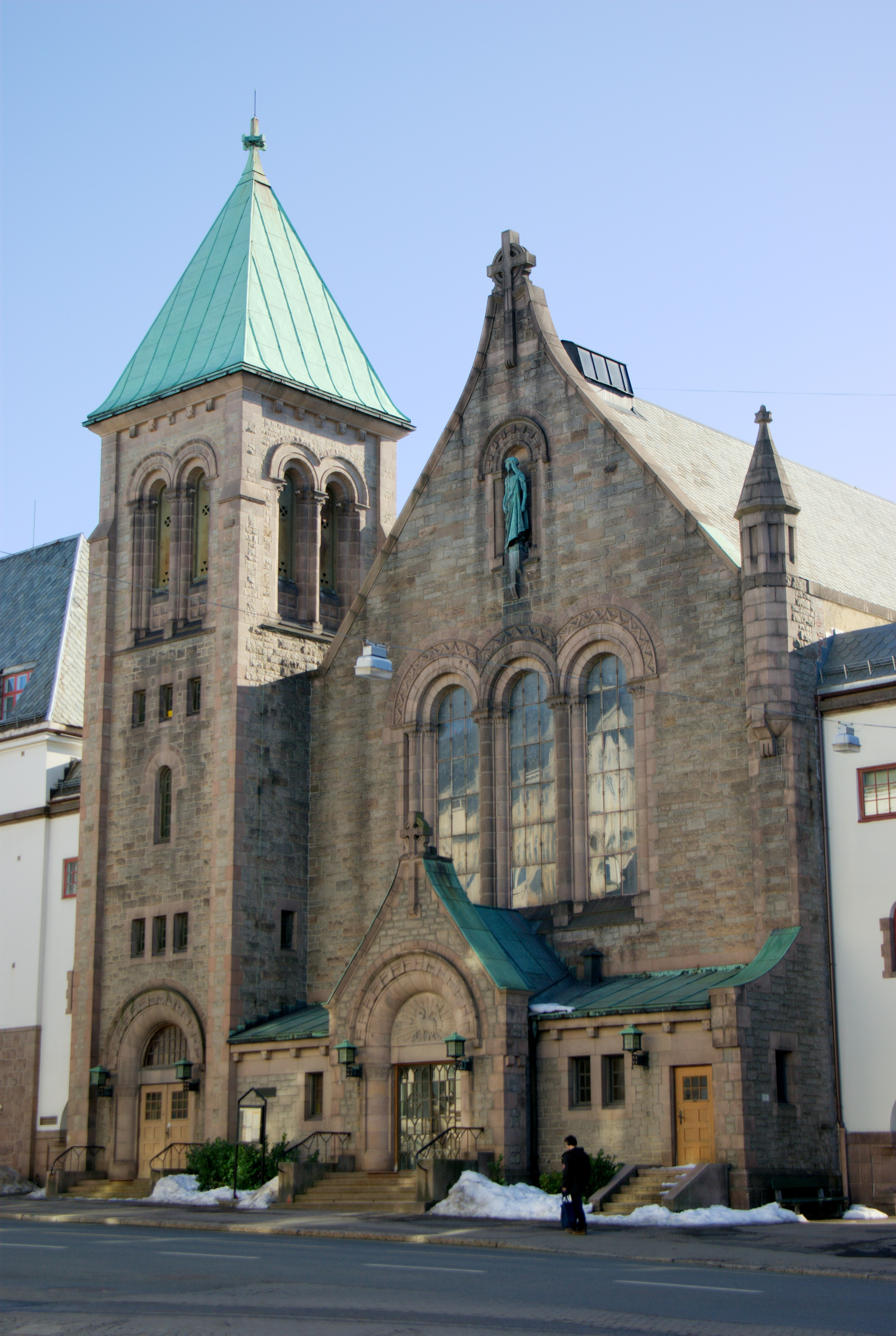

- Location within Oslo Location within Norway
- 59°55′03″N 10°42′24″E
- Location: Bygdøy allé 36, Oslo,
- Country: Norway
- Denomination: Church of Norway
- Churchmanship: Evangelical Lutheran
- Website: frognerkirke.no

History
- Status: Parish church
- Consecrated: December 6, 1907

Architecture
- Functional status: Active
- Architect: Ivar Næss
- Style: Jugendstil

Specifications
- Materials: Stone; Brick

Administration
- Diocese: Diocese of Oslo
- Parish: Frogner

Frogner Church (Norwegian: Frogner kirke) is a parish church in the Frogner borough of the city of Oslo, Norway. The congregation is part of the Oslo arch-deanery within the Diocese of Oslo in the Church of Norway.

== History ==
Frogner Church was designed by the architect Ivar Næss (1878–1936) and built in 1907. The Church's main facade is made of granite, while the secondary facades against courtyards are made of brick. The church is integrated into a row of houses and apartment buildings. A chapel associated with the church was built in 1937–39 by the architect Johan Meyer. The Gimlehøyden district surrounding the church was built in the years 1916–1925 and designed by architects Harald Hals, Harald Aars and Lorentz Harboe Ree.

The pulpit and the altar of clay stone were carved by Ivar Næss in 1907. It was decorated with gold mosaics by Per Vigeland in 1947. Vigeland also made the decorations at the organ gallery and the stained glass windows. Maria Vigeland completed the last window. The altar image as made by sculptor Valentin Kielland in 1907. Kielland also featured images of Olav the Saint, Martin Luther and Hans Nielsen Hauge. Kielland additionally designed the stone relief of the Lamb of God over the front door. In the side gallery there is a painting by Christian Skredsvig.

== Gallery ==
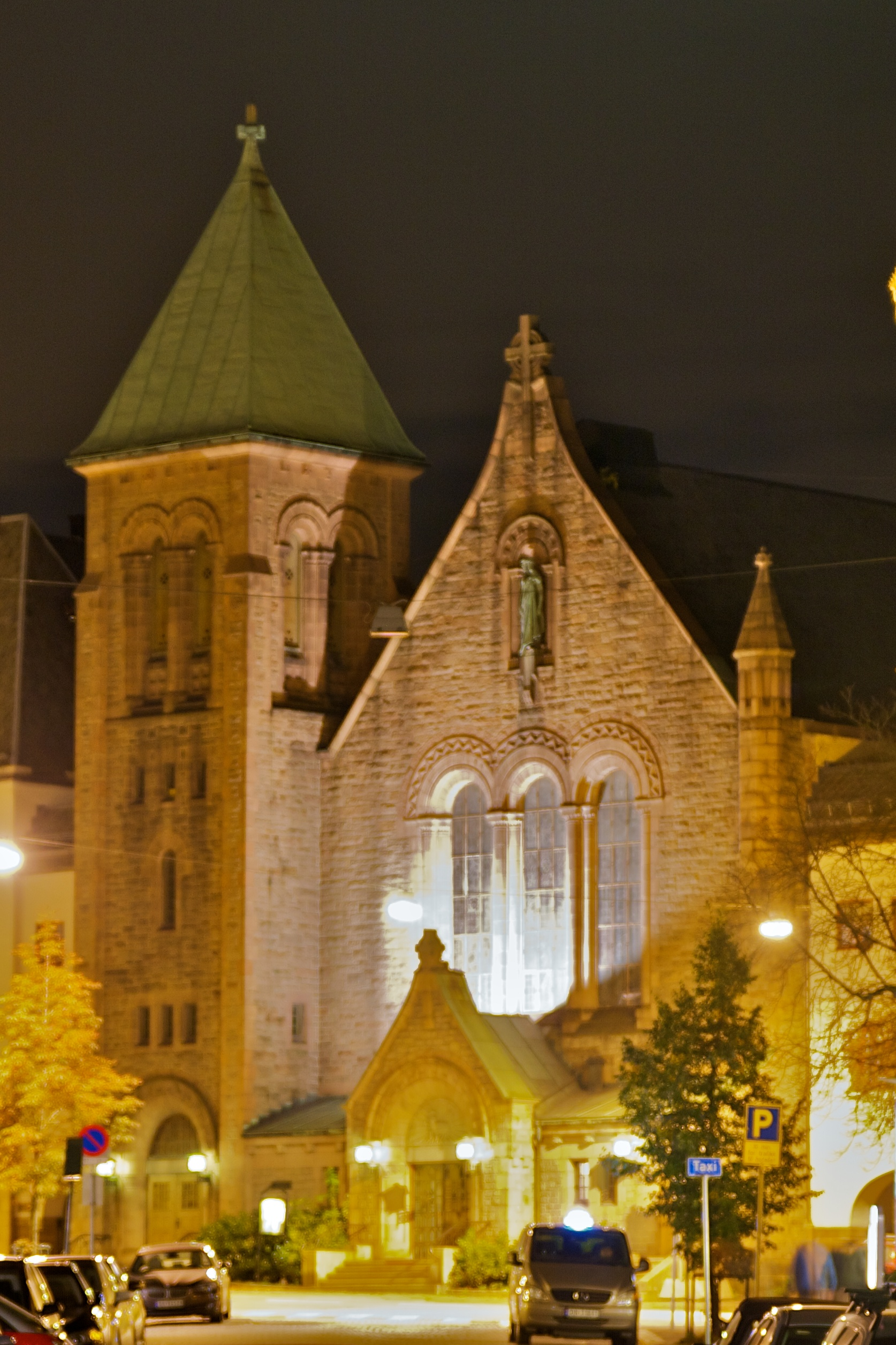
Frogner Church by night

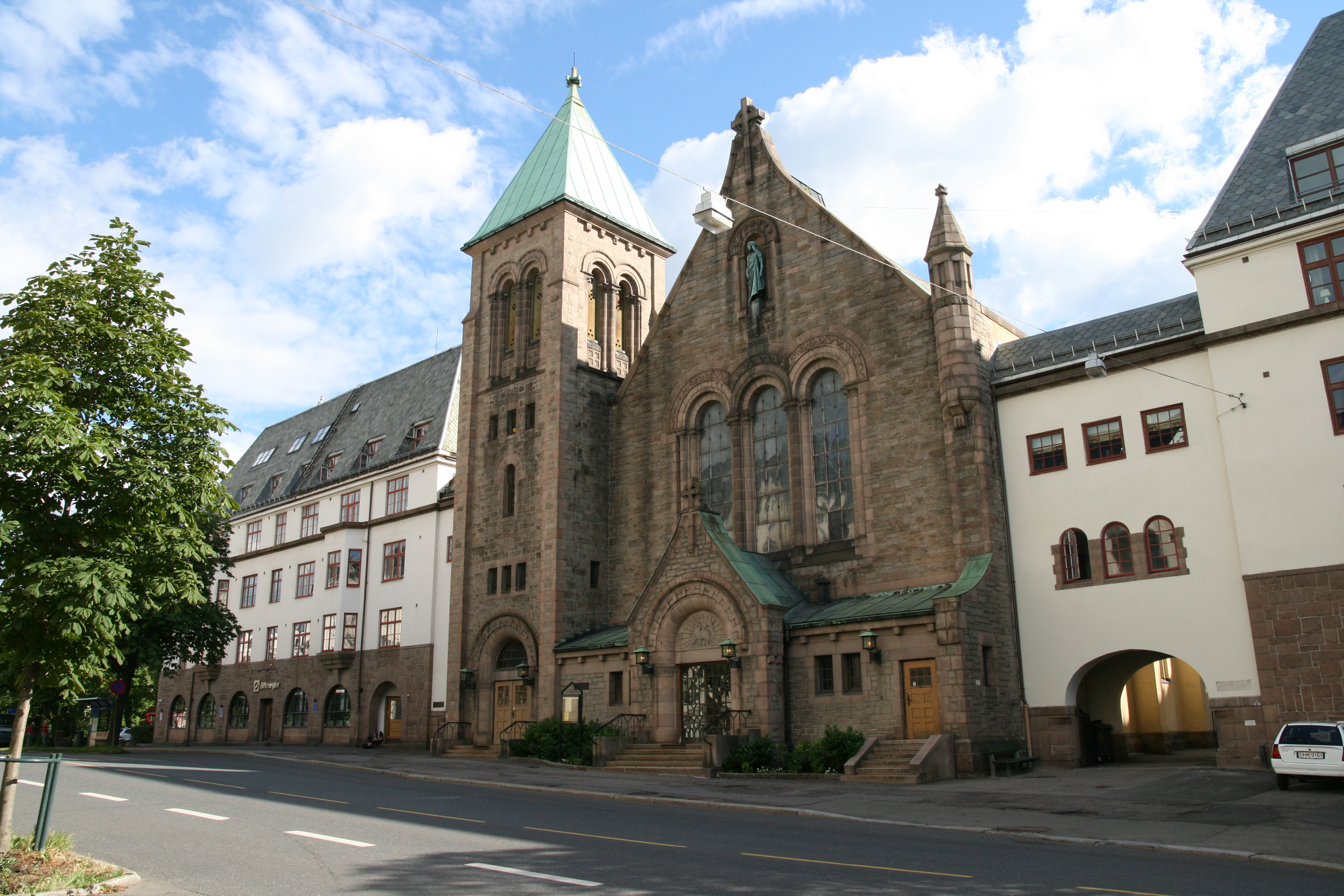
Frogner Church as seen from Bygdøy Allè

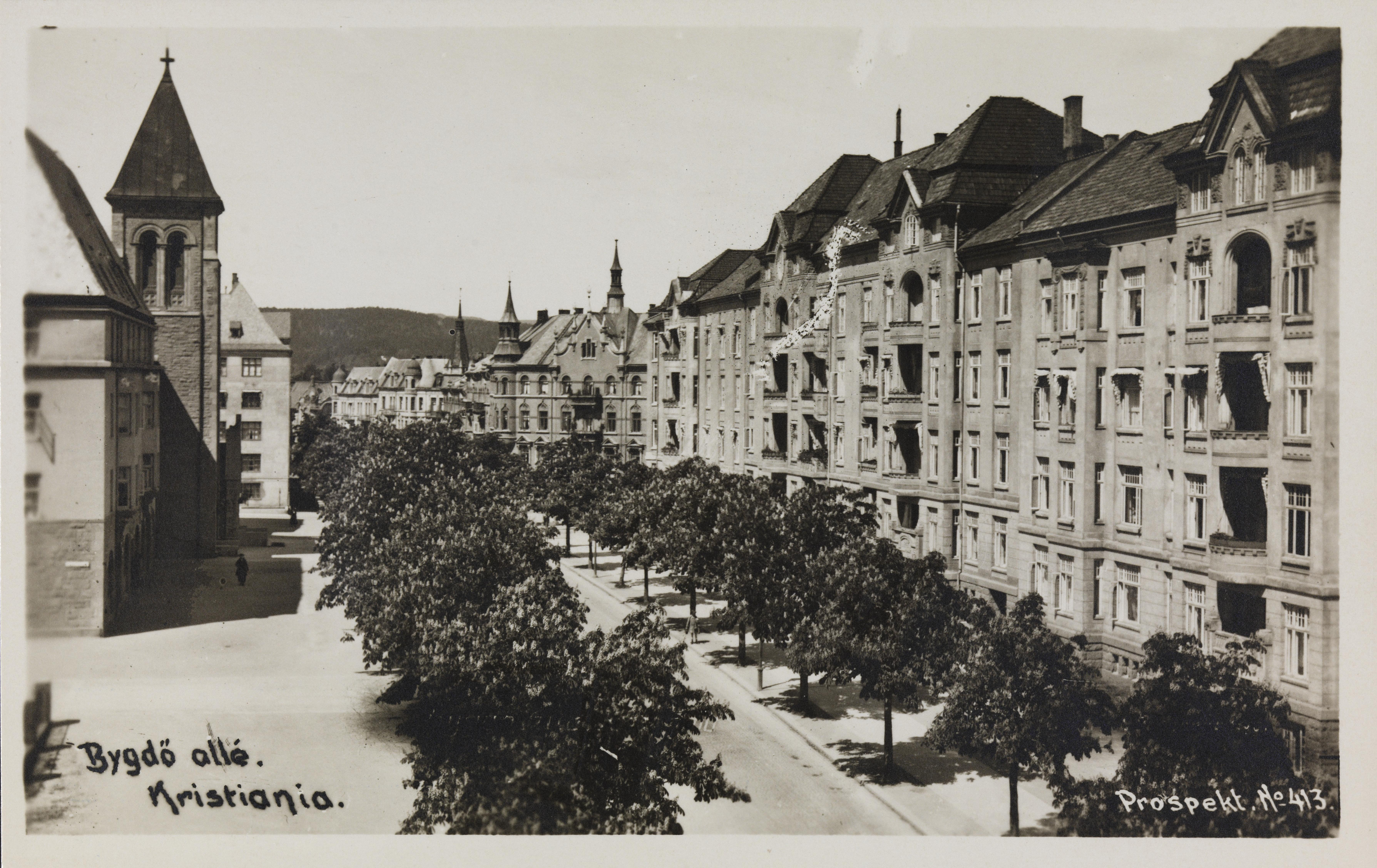
Old postcard I

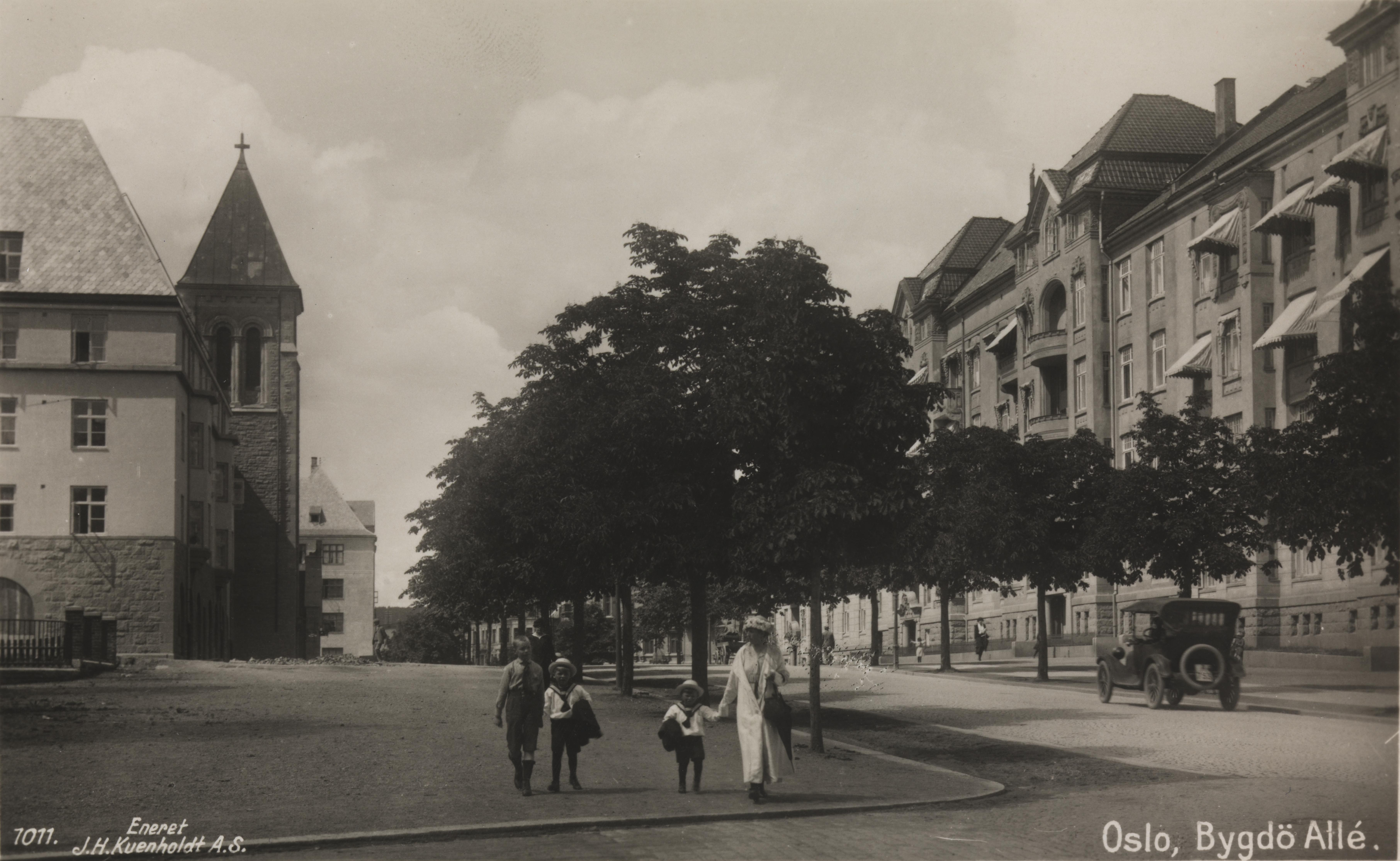
Old postcard II
