= Harald Aars =

Norwegian architect

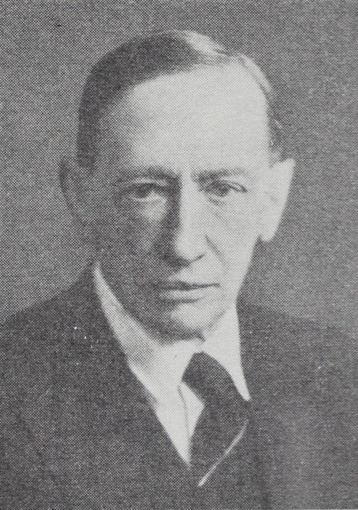
Harald Aars

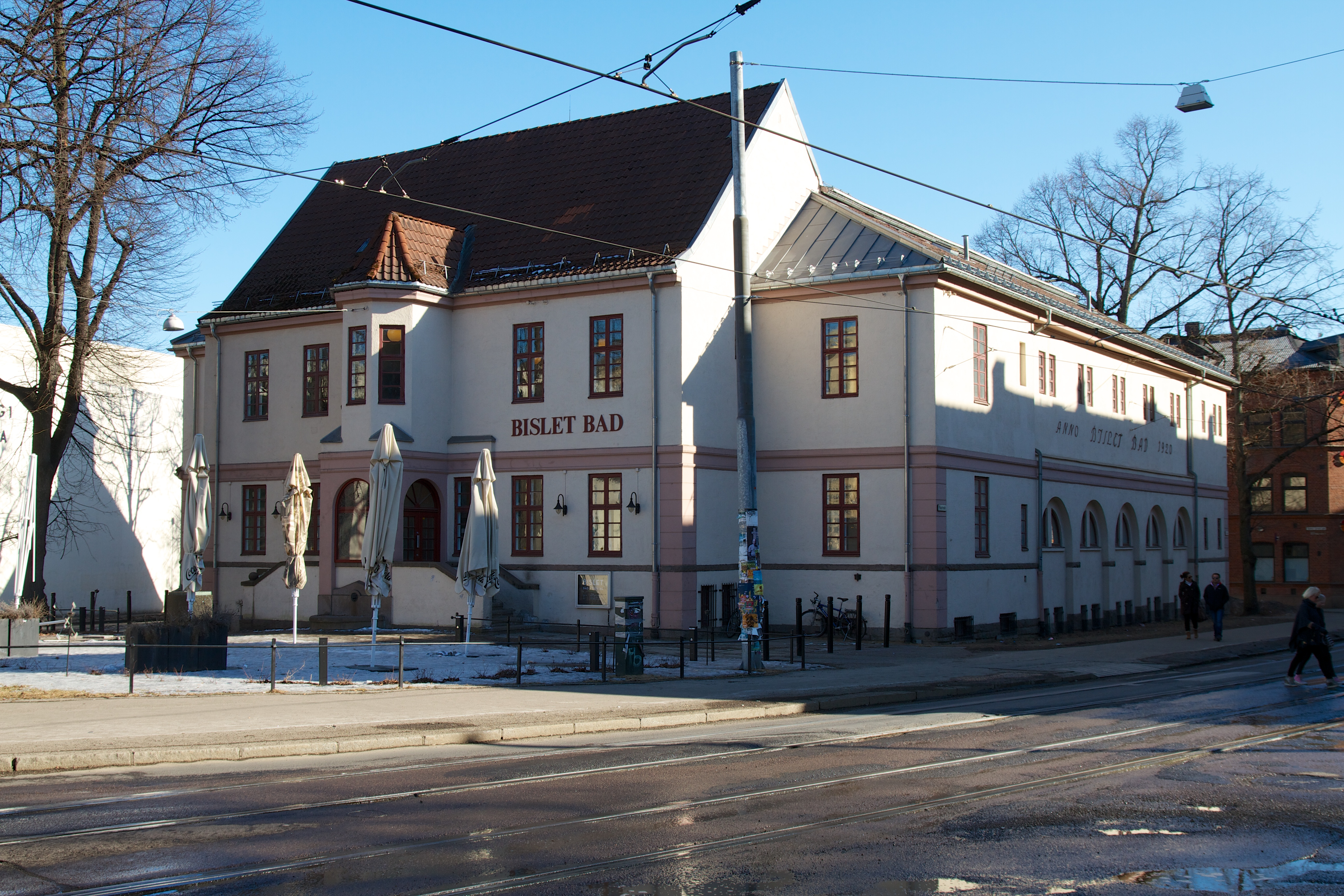
Bislet Baths in Oslo, 1920

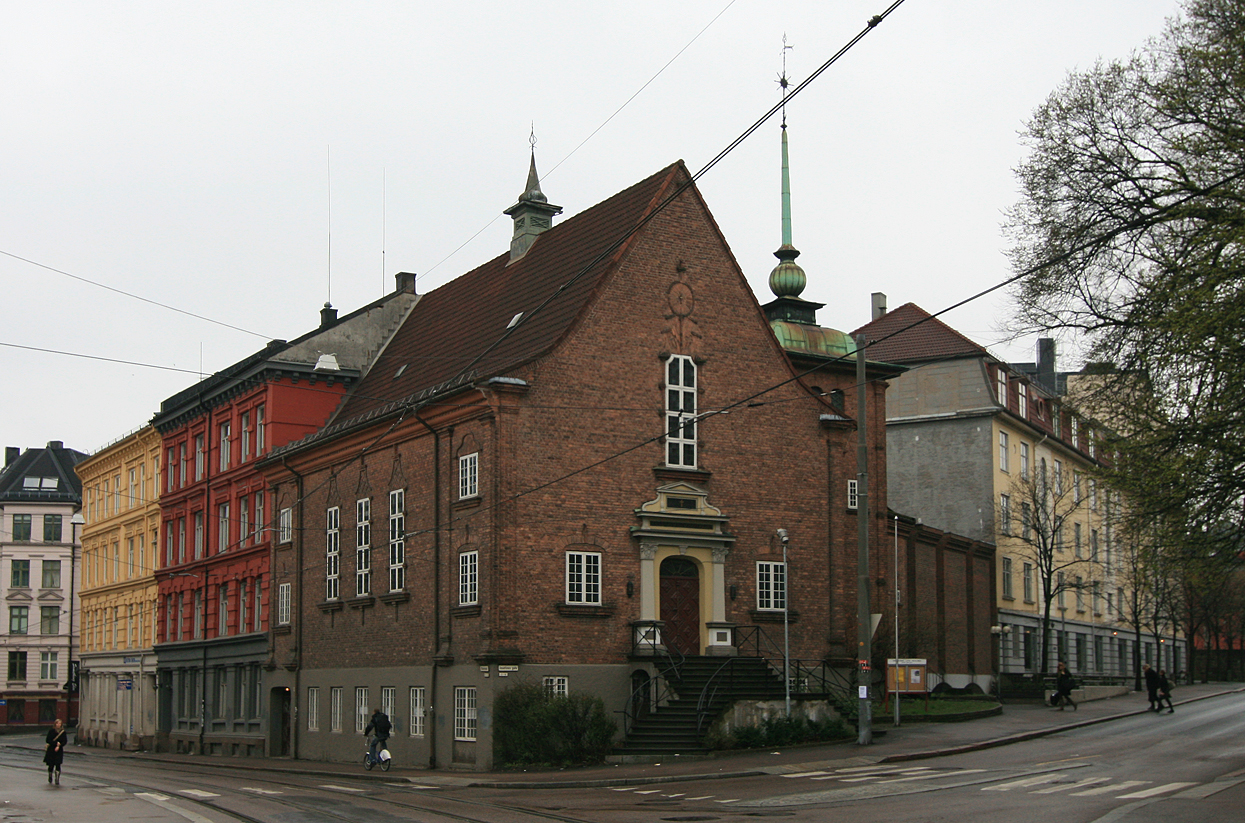
Vestre frikirke in Oslo, 1920

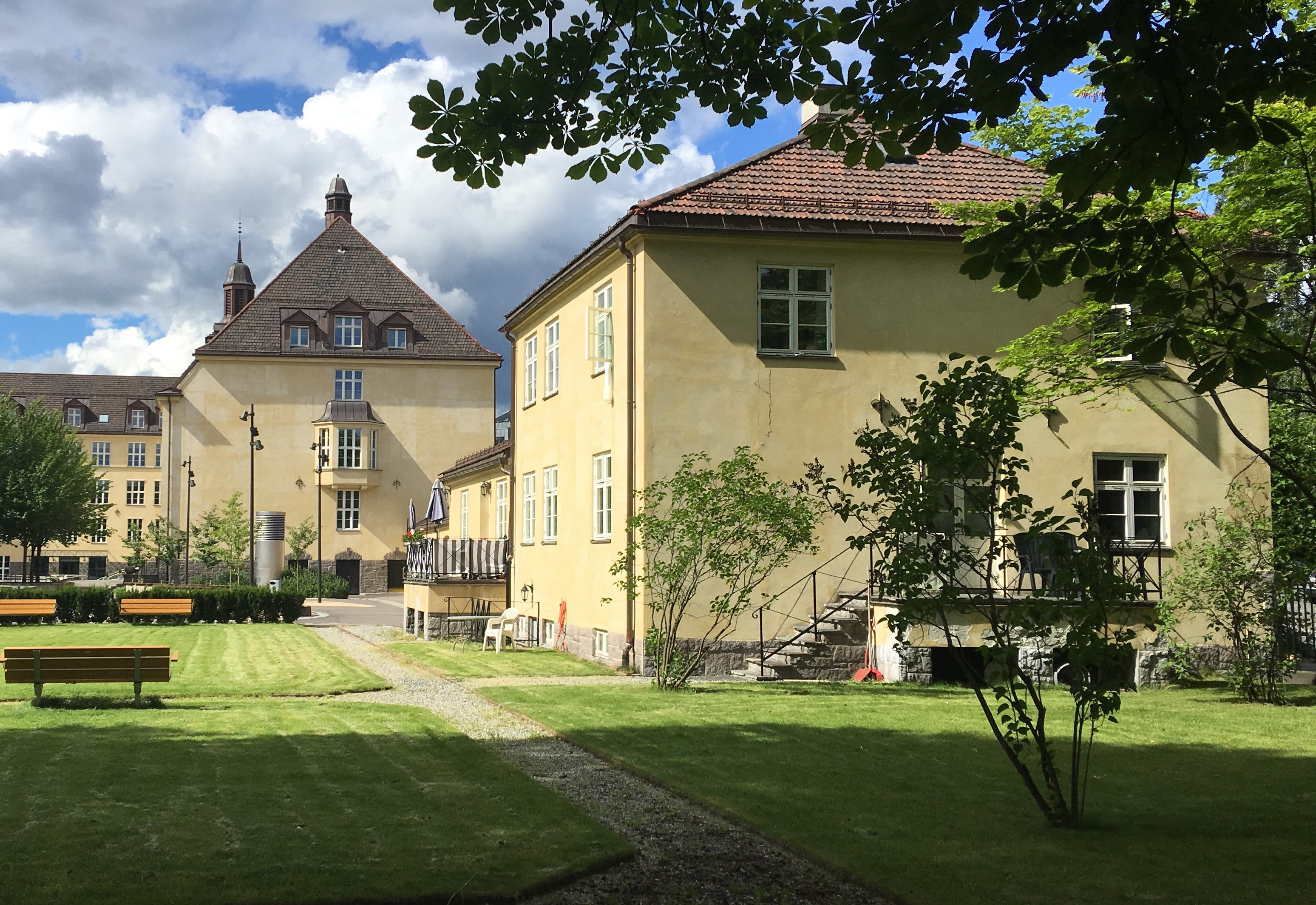
Hersleb skole in Oslo, 1922

Harald Aars (31 May 1875 – 4 June 1945) was a Norwegian architect.

== Personal life ==
He was born in Christiania as a son of educator Jacob Jonathan Aars (1837–1908) and his wife Anna Ernesta Birch-Reichenwald (1838–1919). He was the brother of academic Kristian Aars, a grandson of Christian Birch-Reichenwald and a great-grandson of Peter Motzfeldt. He was also a grandnephew of priest and politician Jens Aars and a second cousin of writer Sophus Christian Munk Aars. In 1899 he married Anna Dybwad Berentzen (1878–1947), a maternal granddaughter of Jacob Dybwad.

== Career ==
Aars finished middle school in 1890, and worked one year at Thunes Mekaniske Værksted before enrolling at construction engineering at Kristiania Technical School. He graduated in 1895, and studied architecture at the Royal College of Arts from 1897 to 1898. During this period he picked up inspiration from William Morris, Walter Crane, C. R. Ashbee, the Art Workers Guild and the Arts and Crafts Movement. He later stayed in the United Kingdom and France from 1901 to 1902, and also had stays in Italy and Greece.

In Norway he was an assistant of Holger Sinding-Larsen from 1899 to 1901 and for the city architect of Kristiania from 1902 to 1904. From 1904 to 1919 he had his own architect's office. He worked with Harald Hals og Lorentz Harboe Ree, especially from 1915. Most of his buildings were raised in the districts of Frogner, St. Hanshaugen and Bislett. A common style, especially around 1920, was the "Nordic neo-baroque". From 1920 to 1940 he was the city architect of Kristiania/Oslo. In this position he was especially responsible for construction of schools.

He had been a member of the school board from 1909 to 1911 and of the city council executive committee from 1911 to 1916. He presided over the National Association of Norwegian Architects from 1918 to 1919 and Selskabet for Oslo Byes Vel from 1927 to 1937. He was a co-editor of Teknisk Ukeblad from 1907 to 1912, and introduced an architecture section in the magazine. He also edited architectural magazines, and wrote the chapter Arkitekturen i det 19. og 20. aarhundrede in the second volume of Norges Kunsthistorie, released 1927.

Aars was decorated as a Commander of the Swedish Order of Vasa and a Knight of the Swedish Order of the Polar Star and the Finnish Order of the White Rose. He died in June 1945 in Oslo.

== Selected works ==
- Lovisenberg kirke (1911–12)
- Ungkarspensjonat, Rjukan (1913)
- Fagerborg skole (1916)
- St. Hanshaug Terrasse (1916)
- Bislet Baths (1920)
- Vestre Frikirke (1920)
- Utvidelse av Sagene skole (1922–26)
- Hersleb skole, with L.H. Ree (1922–24)
- Sagene brannstasjon (1931)
- Elvebakken videregående skole (1937–38)
