= Sophus Aars =

Norwegian civil servant and writer

Sophus Christian Munk Aars
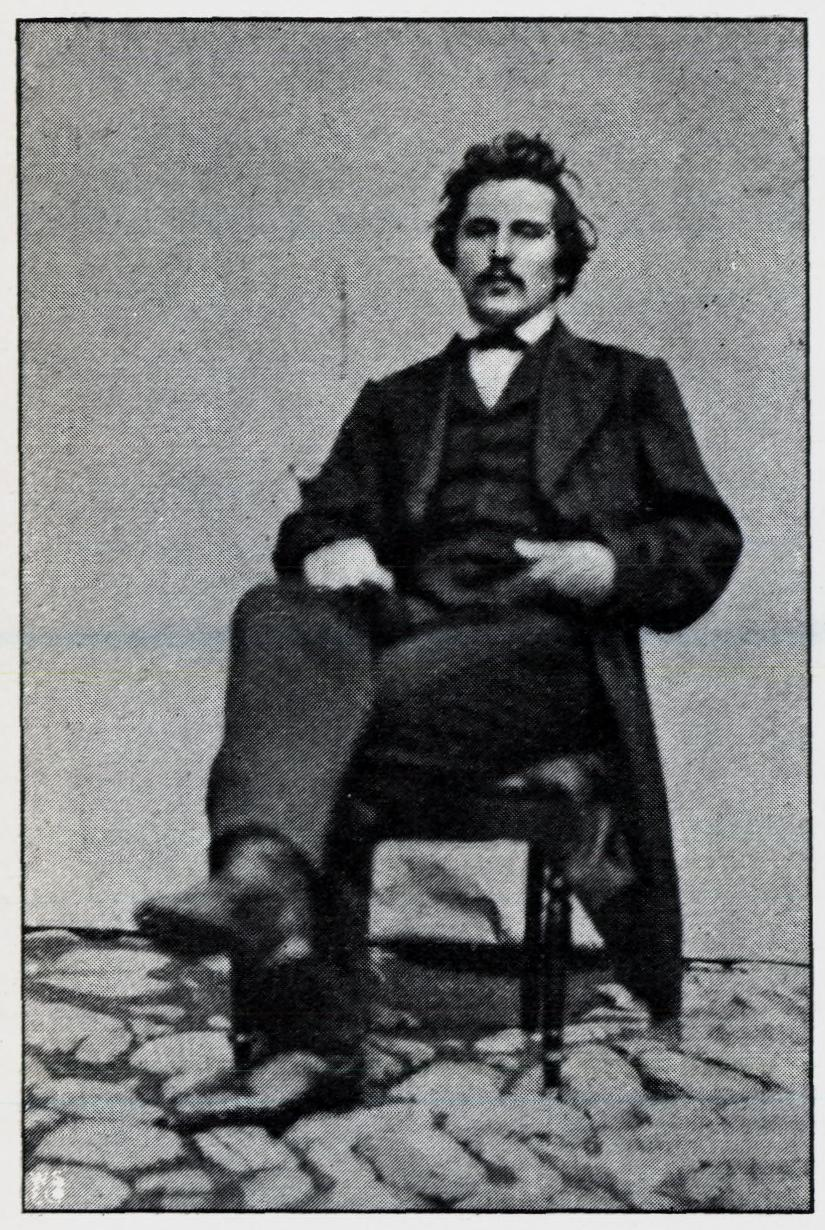
- Born: 1 October 1841; Norway
- Died: 11 April 1931 (aged 89)
- Occupations: Civil servant, writer
- Notable work: I skoven (1886)
- Spouse: Marie Fredrikke Schydtz (m. 1885)
- Parent: Nils Fredrik Julius Aars (father)
- Relatives: Jens Aars (grandfather) Jens Ludvig Andersen Aars (cousin)    Kristian Birch-Reichenwald Aars (second cousin)   Harald Aars (second cousin)

Sophus Christian Munk Aars (1 October 1841 – 11 April 1931) was a Norwegian civil servant and writer.

He was a son of a priest and politician Nils Fredrik Julius Aars (1807–1865) and his wife Sofie Elisabeth Stabel. He was a grandson of priest and politician Jens Aars and a first cousin of banker and politician Jens Ludvig Andersen Aars. He was a second cousin of philosopher Kristian Birch-Reichenwald Aars and architect Harald Aars. In 1885 he married Marie Fredrikke Schydtz (1804–1886).

Munk enrolled as a student in 1861 and graduated with the cand.jur. degree in 1868. He was hired as a civil servant in the Norwegian Ministry of the Interior from 1872, and worked there until 1917. He was better known for his several books, having "won himself a name in the literature" of the day, starting with 1886's I skoven ('In the Forest'). Most of his books were about the forest and wildlife.
