= Bislet Baths =

- Bislet bad
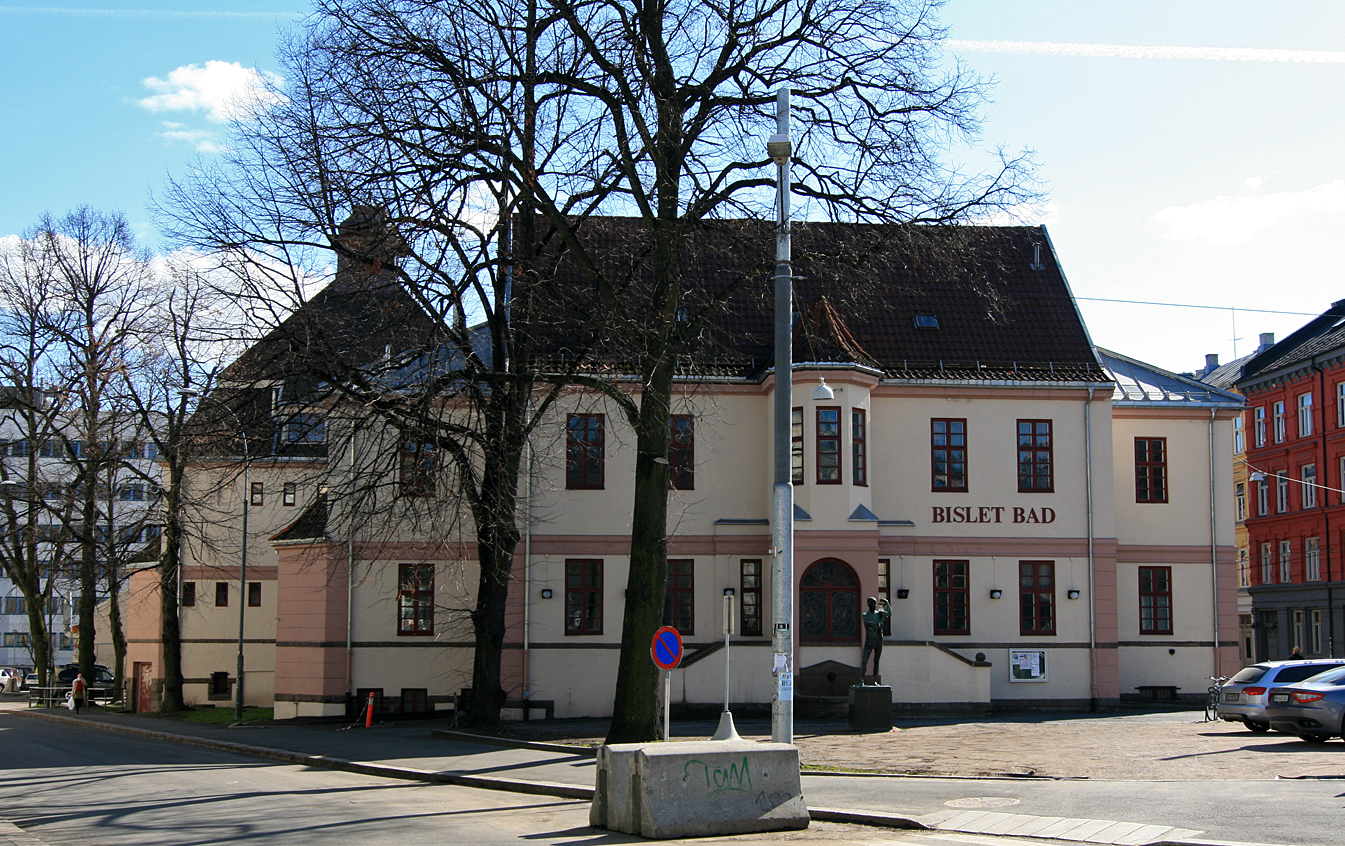
- Interactive map of the Bislet Baths area

General information
- Architectural style: Baroque revival and Neoclassicist
- Location: Bislett, Oslo, Norway, Norway
- Coordinates: 59°55′30.043″N 10°43′52.385″E
- Construction started: 1917
- Completed: 1920

Design and construction
- Architects: Harald Aars and Lorentz Harboe Ree

Bislet Baths (Norwegian: Bislet bad) is a swimming pool and fitness center in Oslo, designed by the architects Harald Aars and Lorentz Harboe Ree. The facility is located in Bislett not far from Bislett Stadium, and it was completed in 1920.

In 2011, the Norwegian Directorate for Cultural Heritage gave the building protected status. It was one of the country's most modern baths when it was built, and it was under municipal ownership until 2005. The Thongård company purchased the baths from the municipality for NOK 1 million and operates it as a bathing and fitness center.
