= Lorentz Harboe Ree =

Norwegian architect (1888–1962)

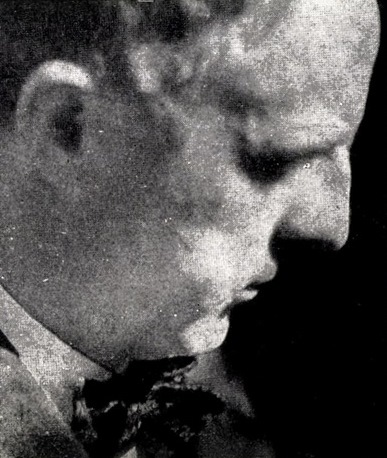
Lorentz Harboe Ree

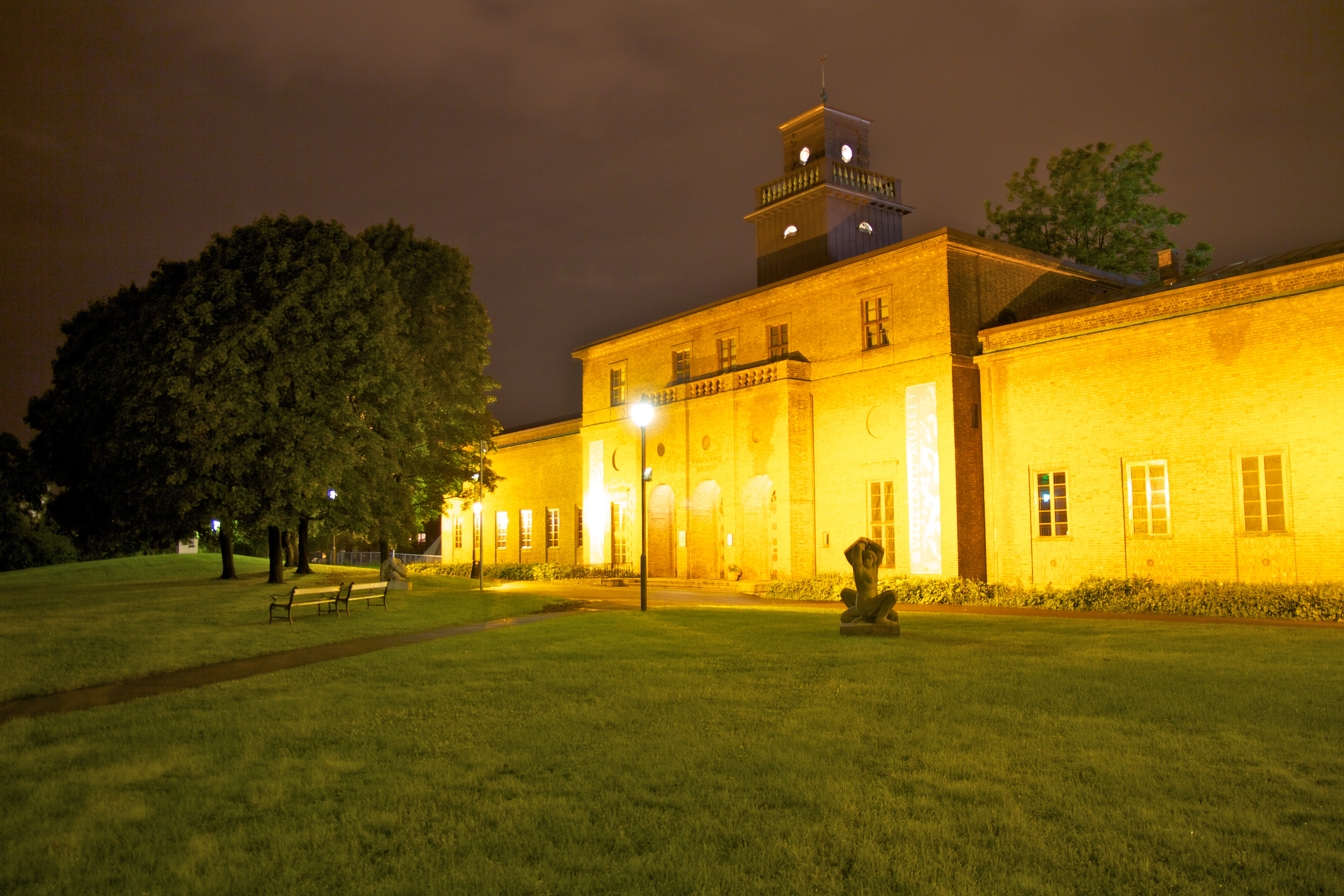
Vigeland Museum in Oslo

Lorentz Harboe Ree (12 March 1888– 8 March 1962) was a Norwegian architect.

Ree was born at Stange Municipality in Hedmark, Norway. He graduated from the Norwegian Institute of Technology in 1915. He first worked as an architectural assistant in Bergen (1916–17). He had his own architectural firm in Kristiania (now Oslo) from 1918. He worked together with Harald Aars (1875–1945) from 1919 and from 1920 with Carl Emil Buch (1892-1968).

Most of the buildings he designed were raised in the Oslo districts of Frogner and St. Hanshaugen as well as the neighborhood of Bislett. His style was often in neo-baroque, although he also preferred neo-classic style. His main work was the Vigeland Museum (Vigeland-museet) for which he was awarded the Houen Foundation Award together with Carl Buch in 1926.

== Selected works ==
- Statens Skogskole, Steinkjer (1923)
- Kinopaléet (1923–24)
- Nore I kraftverk in Buskerud (1925–26)
- Ullevål stadion (1925–26)
- Leiegård, Bygdøy allé 85 (1929)
- Villa for Søren Onsager, Sogn hageby (1931)
- Townhouse, Ottar Birtings gt. 7–9 (1932)
- Townhouse, Majorstuvn. 17 (1935)
- Leiegård, Gabels gt. 46/Vestheimgt. 6 (1936–37)
- Leiegård, Frederik Stangs gt. 35 (1940)
- Drammen gymnas (1954)

== Gallery ==
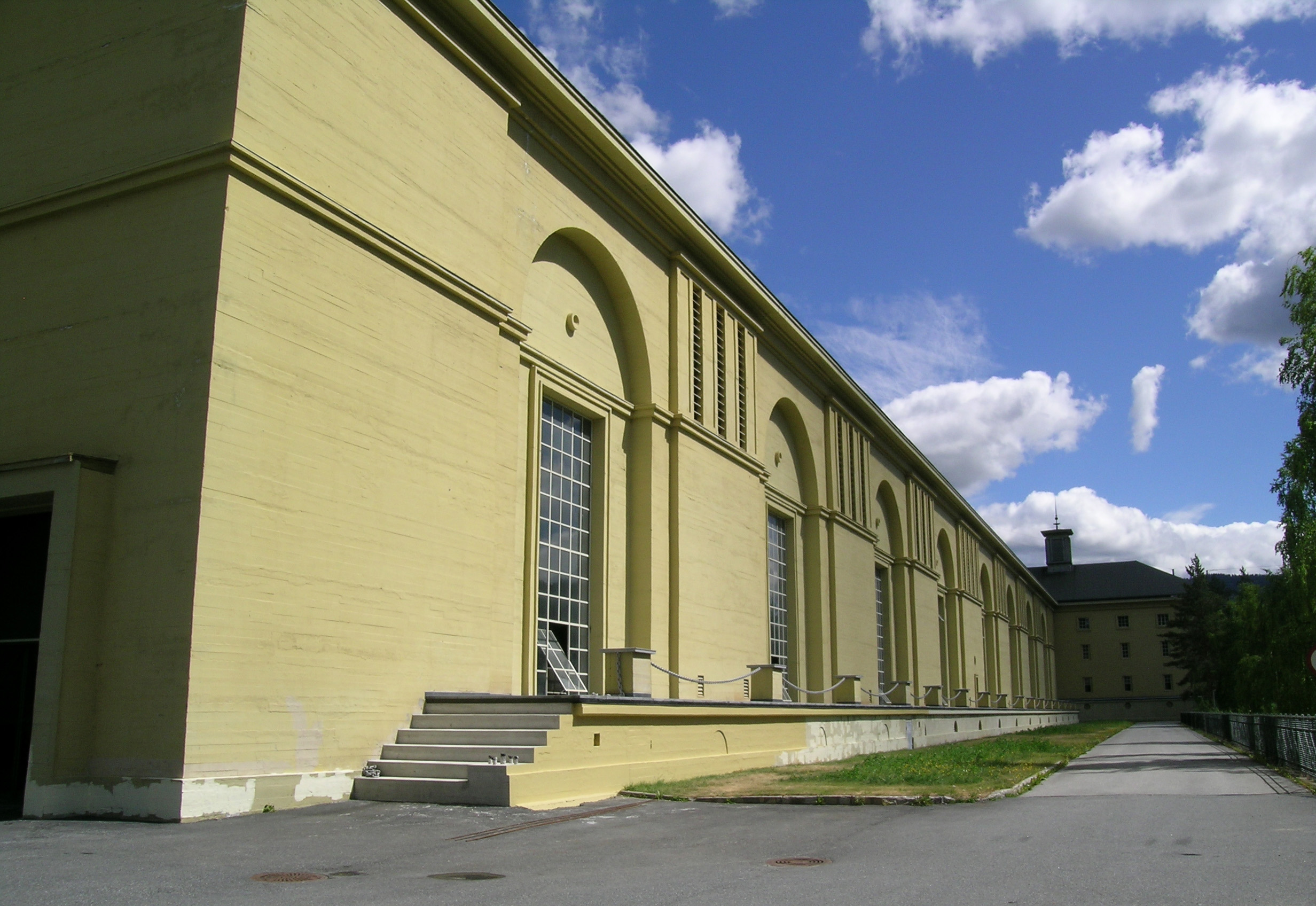
Nore I kraftverk in Buskerud

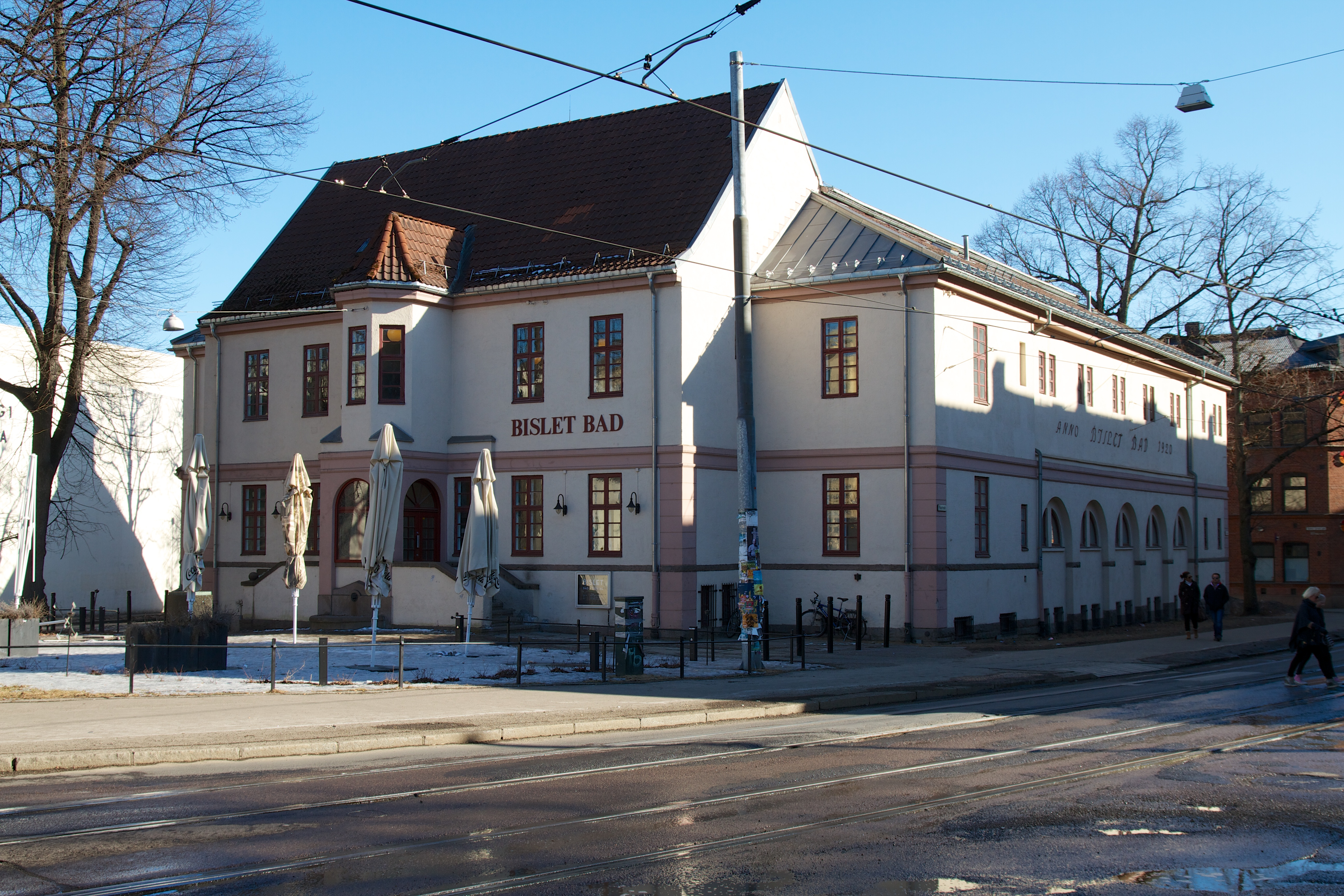
Bislet Baths in Oslo, with Harald Aars

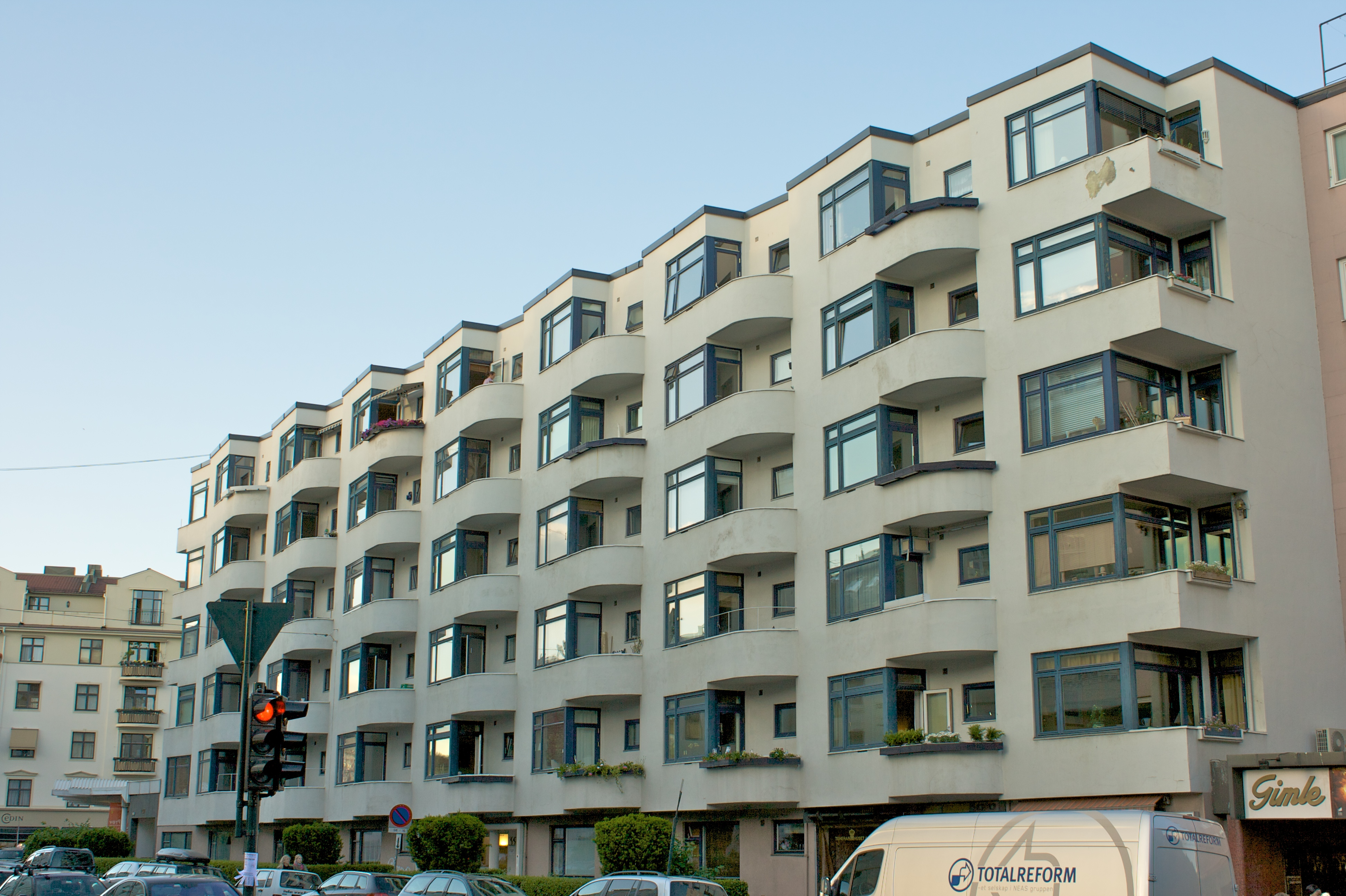
Frederik Stangs gate 35 in Frogner

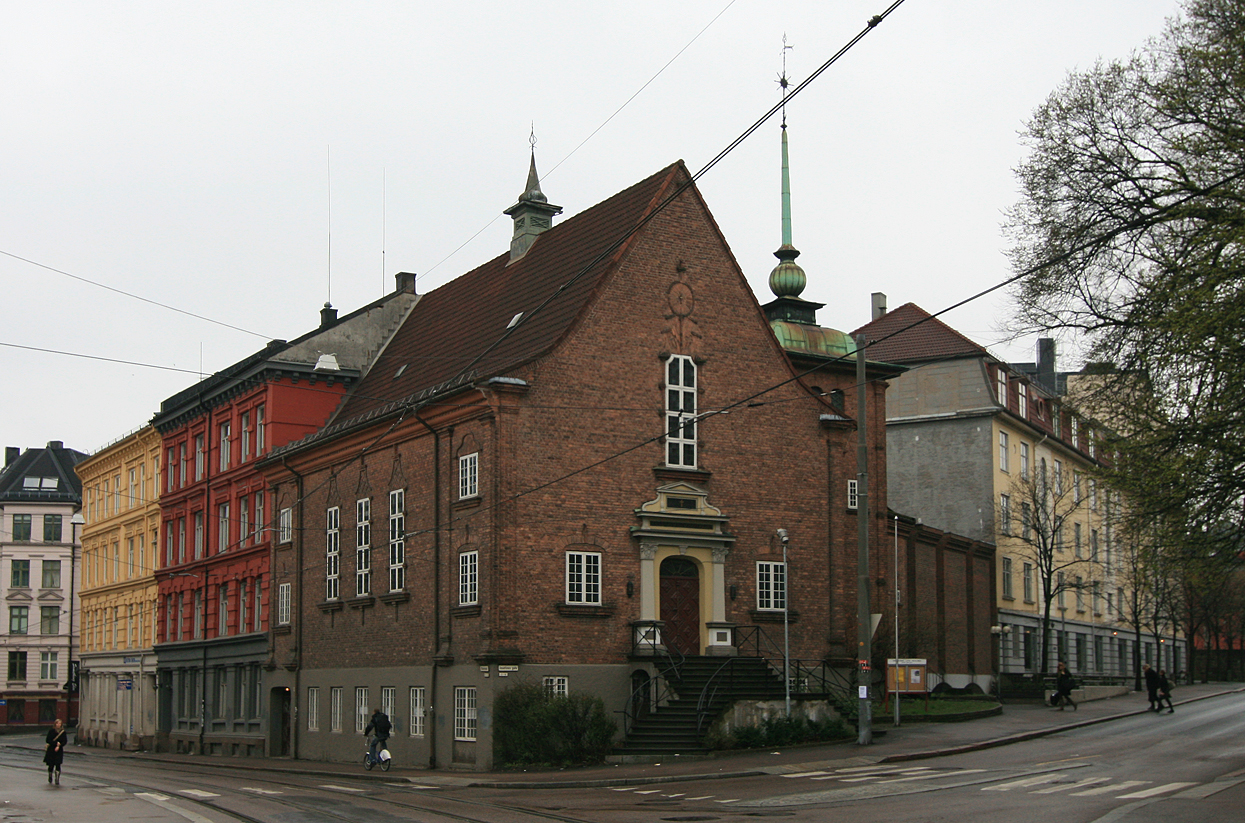
Oslo Vestre Frikirke, with Harald Aars

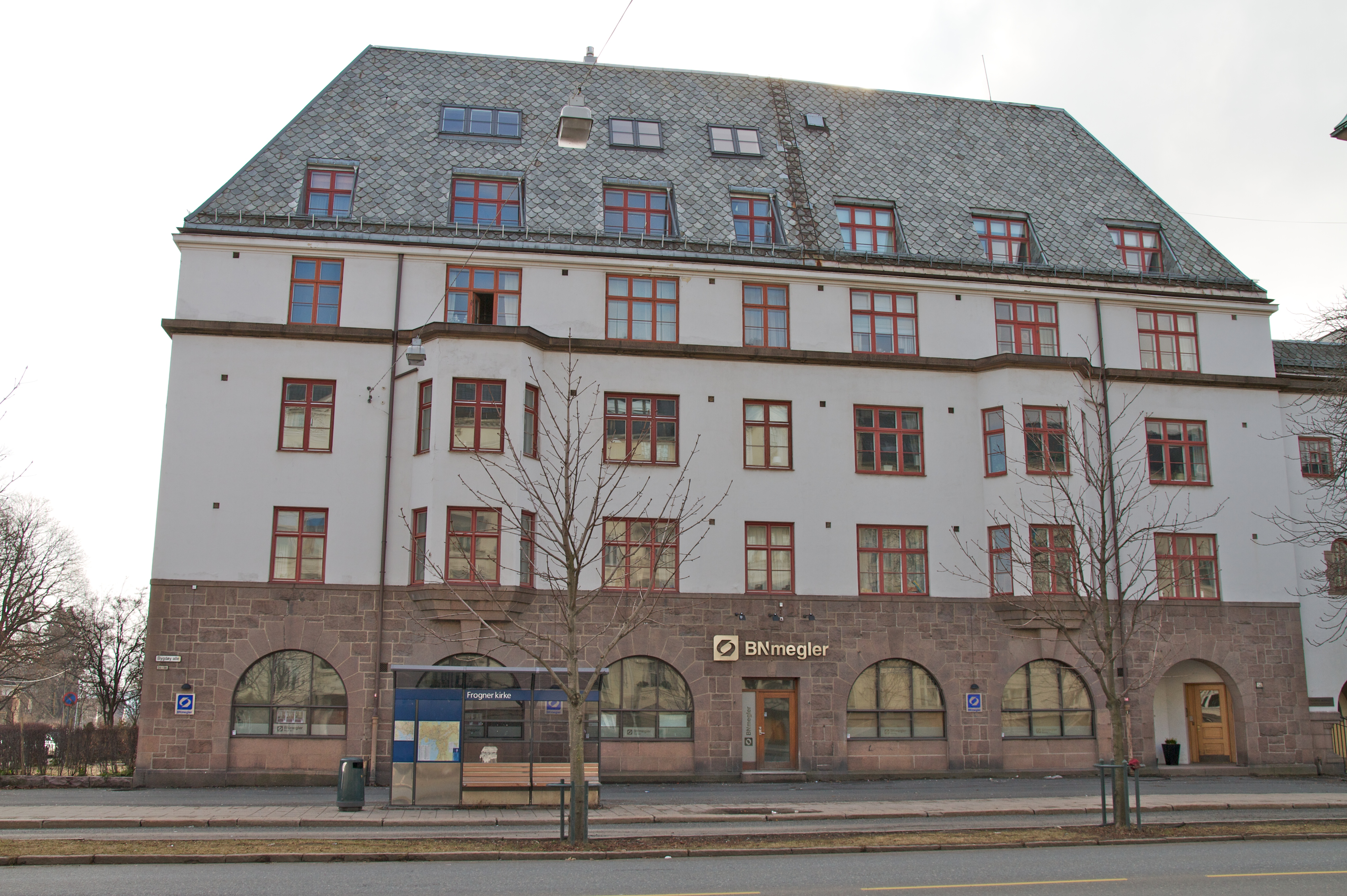
Bygdøy allé 34 in Frogner
