= Ole Larsen Skattebøl =

Norwegian politician

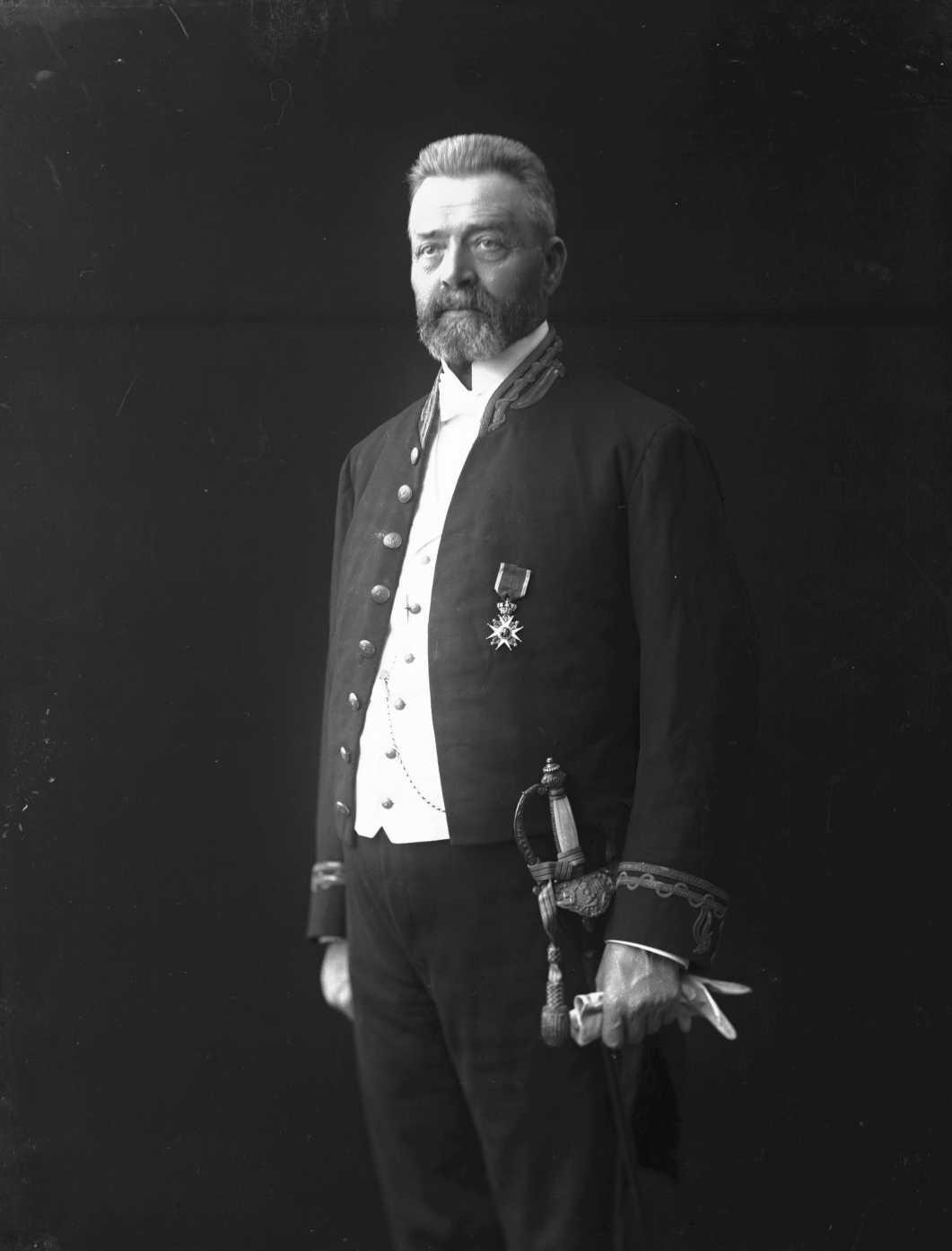
Ole Larsen Skattebøl

Ole Larsen Skattebøl (2 March 1844 – 8 June 1929) was a Norwegian judge and politician for the Conservative Party.

He was born in Ål. He was elected to the Parliament of Norway in 1877, representing the constituency of Buskeruds Amt, and was re-elected in 1880. He then took a hiatus before serving two more terms, 1889–1891 and 1895–1897. He chaired the central committee of his party from 1902 to 1905.

Skattebøl was appointed as district stipendiary magistrate (sorenskriver) in Hallingdal District Court in 1890, and from 1899 he was the estate administrator in Kristiania. From 1904 to 1918 he served as a Supreme Court Assessor.

Party political offices
Preceded by Francis Hagerup	Chairman of the Conservative Party of Norway; 1902–1905	Succeeded by Edm. Harbitz
