= Gustav Vigeland =

Norwegian sculptor

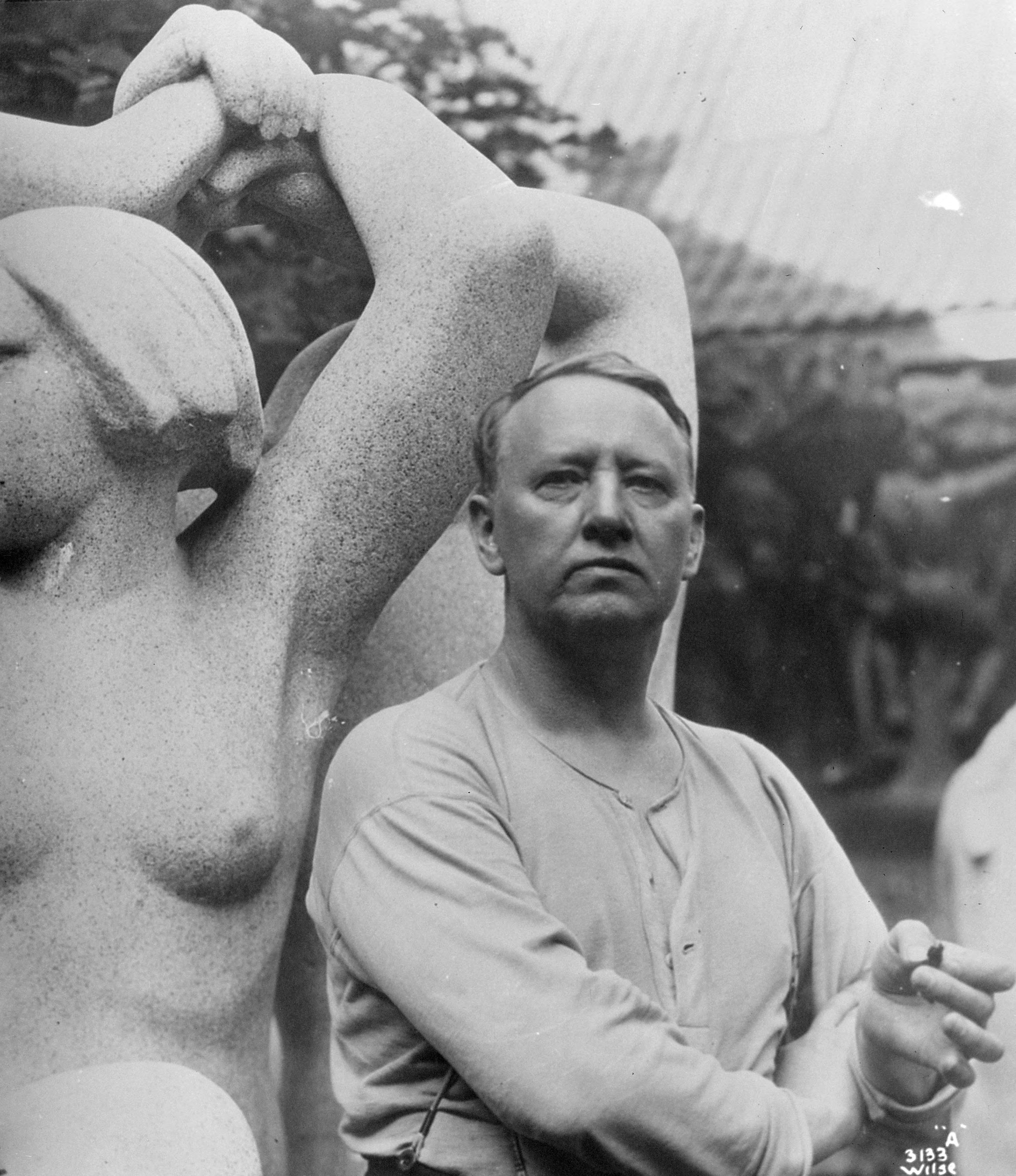
- Born: Adolf Gustav Thorsen; April 11, 1869
- Died: March 12, 1943 (aged 73)
- Known for: Sculpture

Gustav Vigeland (11 April 1869 – 12 March 1943), born as Adolf Gustav Thorsen, was a Norwegian sculptor. Gustav Vigeland occupies a special position among Norwegian sculptors, both in the power of his creative imagination and in his productivity. He is most associated with the Vigeland installation (Vigelandsanlegget) in Frogner Park, Oslo. The Vigeland installation made Frogner Park into Norway's most popular tourist attraction, and the park also contains Frogner Manor with the Oslo Museum and the Henriette Wegner Pavilion. Vigeland was also the designer of the Nobel Peace Prize medal.

== Early life ==
Adolf Gustav Thorsen was born to a family of craftsmen in Halsaa og Hartmark Municipality, near the town of Mandal in southern Norway. His parents were Elisæus Thorsen (1835–1886), a cabinetmaker and Anne Aanensdatter (1835–1907). He had three brothers, of whom Emanuel Vigeland (originally Thorsen) became a noted artist. As a youth, he was sent to Oslo where he learned wood carving at a local school. However, the sudden death of his father compelled him to move to Mandal to help his family. Gustav lived for a time with his grandparents on a farm called Mjunebrokka near the village of Vigeland in Søndre Undal Municipality (now part of Lindesnes Municipality).

He returned to Oslo in 1888, this time determined to become a professional sculptor. He came to the attention of sculptor Brynjulf Bergslien, who supported him and gave him practical training. The following year he exhibited his first work, Hagar and Ishmael. In his 20s, he adopted the new family name Vigeland, from the area where he had briefly lived.

Vigeland spent the years 1891 to 1896 in several voyages abroad, including Copenhagen, Paris, Berlin and Florence. In the French capital he frequented Auguste Rodin's workshop, while in Italy he experimented with ancient and Renaissance artworks. In these years the themes that would later dominate his inspiration - death and the relationship between man and woman - first appeared. He held his first personal exhibitions in Norway in 1894 and 1896, which received notable critical praise.

== Early public works ==
Until 1902 Vigeland was engaged in the restoration of the Nidaros Cathedral in Trondheim. The contact with Mediaeval art contributed to another frequent theme in Vigeland's art, the dragon as symbol of sin but also as a nature force, fighting against man.

Back in Oslo, he obtained from the town an abandoned studio in which to work. In 1905 Norway became independent from Sweden. Vigeland, considered the most talented Norwegian sculptor, received numerous commissions for statues and busts celebrating renowned compatriots like Henrik Ibsen and Niels Henrik Abel.

In 1906 Vigeland proposed a chalk model for a monumental fountain. Initially, the idea of the Oslo municipality was to put the fountain in Eidsvolls plass, the square in front of the Parliament of Norway. His work was generally welcomed, but the location created a dispute: completion of the work was postponed by the dispute. In the meantime Vigeland enlarged the original project, adding several sculpture groups. The high granite column was added to the design in 1919.

== Vigeland installation ==
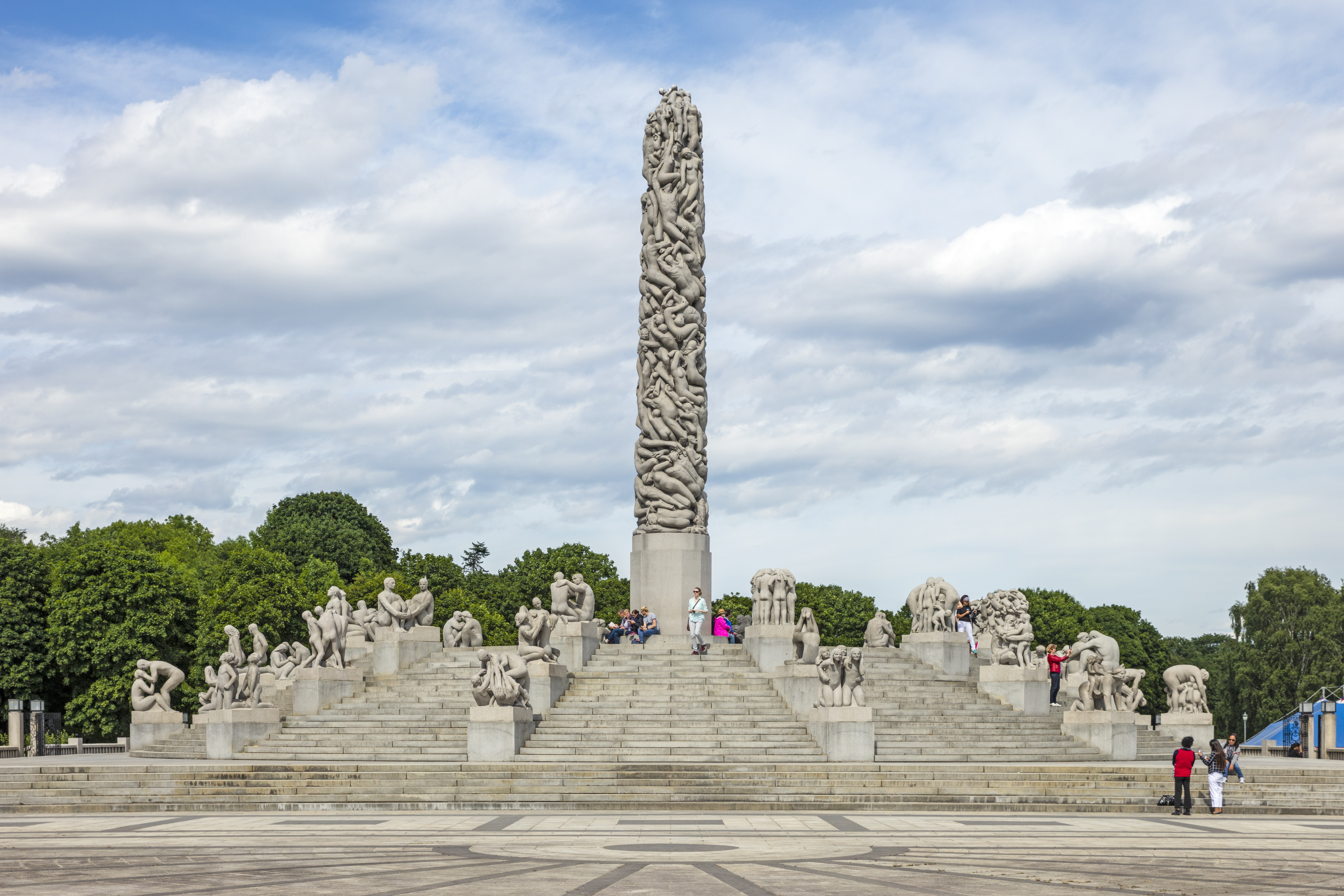
The Monolith, Vigeland installation in Frogner Park, Oslo

Gustav Vigeland is most widely known for the Vigeland installation, a permanent sculpture installation in Frogner Park in Oslo.

In 1921 the City of Oslo decided to demolish the house where Vigeland lived and build a library. After a long dispute, Vigeland was granted a new building from the city where he could work and live; in exchange, he promised to donate to the city all his subsequent works, including sculptures, drawings, engravings and models.

Vigeland moved to his new studio on Nobels gate in the borough of Frogner during 1924. His studio was located in the vicinity of Frogner Park, which he had chosen as the definitive location for his fountain. Over the following twenty years, Vigeland was devoted to the project of an open exhibition of his works, which later turned into what is known as Vigeland Sculpture Arrangement (Vigelandsanlegget) in Frogner Park. The Vigeland installation features 212 bronze and granite sculptures all designed by Gustav Vigeland. The sculptures culminate in the famous Monolith (Monolitten), with its 121 figures struggling to reach the top of the sculpture.

== Vigeland Museum ==
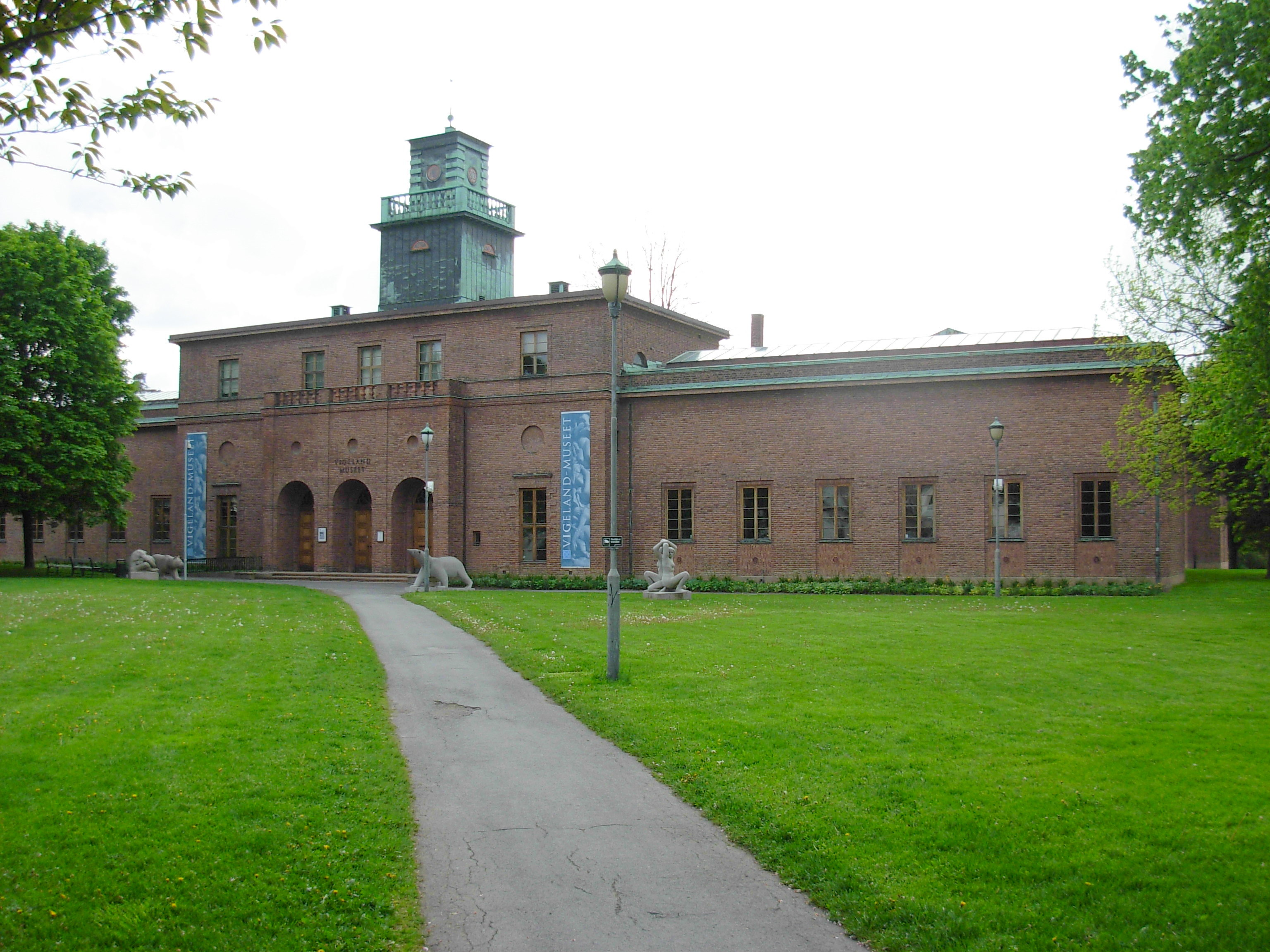
Vigeland Museum

Vigeland lived and worked at his studio on Nobels gate until his death in 1943. His ashes are still preserved there in the belfry of the building. According to the agreement with the City of Oslo, the building became the Vigeland Museum (Vigelandsmuseet).

The site is located immediately south of the Vigeland Sculpture Arrangement. Vigeland's flat on the third floor was preserved as a part of the museum which houses various works by the artist, along with the plaster models of the Vigeland sculptures in Frogner Park.

== Legacy ==
Some art critics considered Vigeland's sculptures to be expressions of nazi or fascist aesthetics, and he has been compared to Arno Breker. Writing in Verdens Gang, a newspaper started by former Norwegian resistance members shortly after the German occupation of Norway ended in 1945, Pola Gauguin wrote that the Vigeland installation "reeks of Nazi mentality.” The works in the installation depict individuals variously possessed: In agony and shock; Rapture and torture, from birth to death and beyond. The assessment of Strømodden finds no political themes.

During the German occupation, an official request was made for the head of the German administration’s Cultural Department to visit Vigeland’s studio. In his letter of reply, Vigeland stated that he would "gladly” open his studio, and, in addition, he also “confidently dares to let German soldiers with their outstanding discipline walk around between my work”. The pro-Nazi Quisling regime then used this response for propaganda purposes, publishing it, among other places, in a national daily newspaper (Aftenposten, 15 April 1944). This has led to accusations of Vigeland being a Nazi sympathiser, but it should be borne in mind that since Vigeland’s studio was funded by the municipality, he was obliged to accept visits at their request, and had done since 1924. Vigeland refused to be present at all such visits, including these. As for including German soldiers, fear by Vigeland of the German military’s propensity for confiscating both buildings and artworks should be considered as a factor. Tone Wikborg, Senior Curator at the Vigeland Museum, Oslo stated that 'Vigeland undoubtedly had a conservative view of art, and could be said to be in line with Nazi or, for that matter, communist attitudes towards modernist non-figurative art. But this does not make him, or the many others who have both before and since held the same opinion, a sympathiser of any specific political system.'

Posterity, a 2015 play by Doug Wright, imagined the interaction between Vigeland and Henrik Ibsen.
