= Edmund Harbitz =

Norwegian lawyer and politician

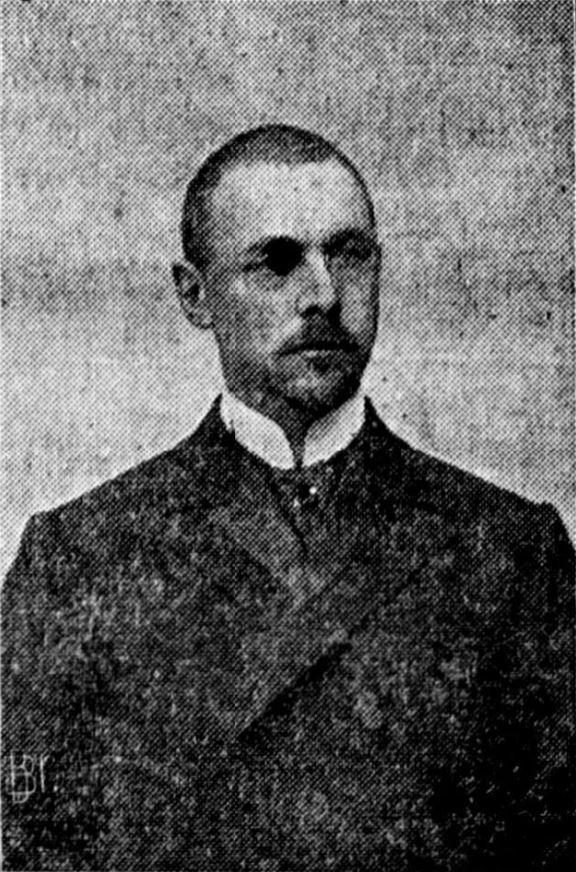
Edmund Theobald Harbitz

Edmund Theobald Harbitz (2 October 1861 – 7 May 1916) was a Norwegian lawyer and politician for the Conservative Party. He chaired the party from 1905 to 1908, and served as mayor of Oslo from 1899 to 1901.

== Early life and career ==
He was a son of office manager Christian Fredrik Gottfred Bohr Harbitz (1833–1916) and his wife Fanny Theobald (1839–1872). He was the older brother of pathologist Francis Harbitz, and a paternal grandson of Georg Prahl Harbitz. He enrolled as a law student in 1880, and graduated with the cand.jur. degree in 1884. He worked as a law clerk from 1884 to 1890, and in 1890 he opened a lawyer's office together with the later Minister of Foreign Affairs, Christian Fredrik Michelet. From 1896 Harbitz was a barrister with access to Supreme Court cases.

In November 1891 in Hamburg he married Helga Fredrikke Winding Pettersen, who hailed from Bergen.

== Political career ==
In 1897 Harbitz became involved in the Conservative Association in Kristiania. He chaired this association from 1898 to 1904. In December 1898 he was elected to serve in Kristiania city council. With 43 out of 84 votes, the city council elected Harbitz as mayor. He served as mayor for one term, until 1901. His term as mayor was greatly affected by the economic bust of 1899.

Harbitz was also active in national politics, and was a member of the national Conservative Party for many years. He chaired the party from 1905 to 1908, succeeding Ole Larsen Skattebøl and being succeeded by Fredrik Stang, Jr. In 1905 he was asked to become a minister in the new cabinet Michelsen, but he declined.

He also chaired the board of the conservative newspaper Morgenbladet from 1902, but due to disagreements with editor-in-chief Nils Vogt in 1913, both Harbitz and Vogt stepped down from their positions. Harbitz died three years later.

Political offices
Preceded by Vollert Hille Bøgh	Mayor of Oslo; 1899–1901	Succeeded by Jens Ludvig Andersen Aars
Party political offices
Preceded by Ole Larsen Skattebøl	Chairman of the Conservative Party of Norway; 1905–1908	Succeeded by Fredrik Stang, Jr.
