= Jens Aars =

Norwegian politician (1780–1834)

member of the Norwegian Parliament
- In office 1821–1829

Personal details
- Born: 1 October 1779 Christiania
- Died: 27 March 1834 (aged 54)
- Occupation: priest

Jens Aars (1 October 1779 – 27 March 1834) was a Norwegian priest who became a Member of Parliament in 1821, representing the constituency of Nordland

== Early life and education ==
Jens Aars was born in Christiania (now Oslo, Norway). He was the son of district stipendiary magistrate Jacob Aars, who had migrated to Norway from Aars, Denmark, in 1757. He was a student at Christiania Latin School and earning his theological degree with honors in 1801.

== Career ==
In 1804 he became assistant pastorat Rødøy Church, in 1806 substitute priest at Enebakk Church in Akershus and in 1817 vicar to Hadsel Church in Nordland. He was transferred to Lier in Buskerud in August 1821.

Aars was elected to the Norwegian Parliament in 1821, representing the constituency of Nordland. He was a member of the Parliamentary deputation to Stockholm in 1823. In 1832 he became a member of the Swedish Order of Vasa cleric (Vasaordenen).

== Personal life ==
In 1803, he was married to Nicoline Elisabeth Mielsen. Their children included priest and politician Nils Fredrik Julius Aars. They were also the grandparents of writer Sophus Christian Munk Aars as well as banker and politician Jens Ludvig Andersen Aars. Also, through his brother, Jens Aars was an uncle of educator Jacob Jonathan Aars and granduncle of philosopher Kristian Birch-Reichenwald Aars and architect Harald Aars. He was also a maternal great-grandfather of Harald Gram.
