= Nils Fredrik Julius Aars =

Norwegian priest and politician

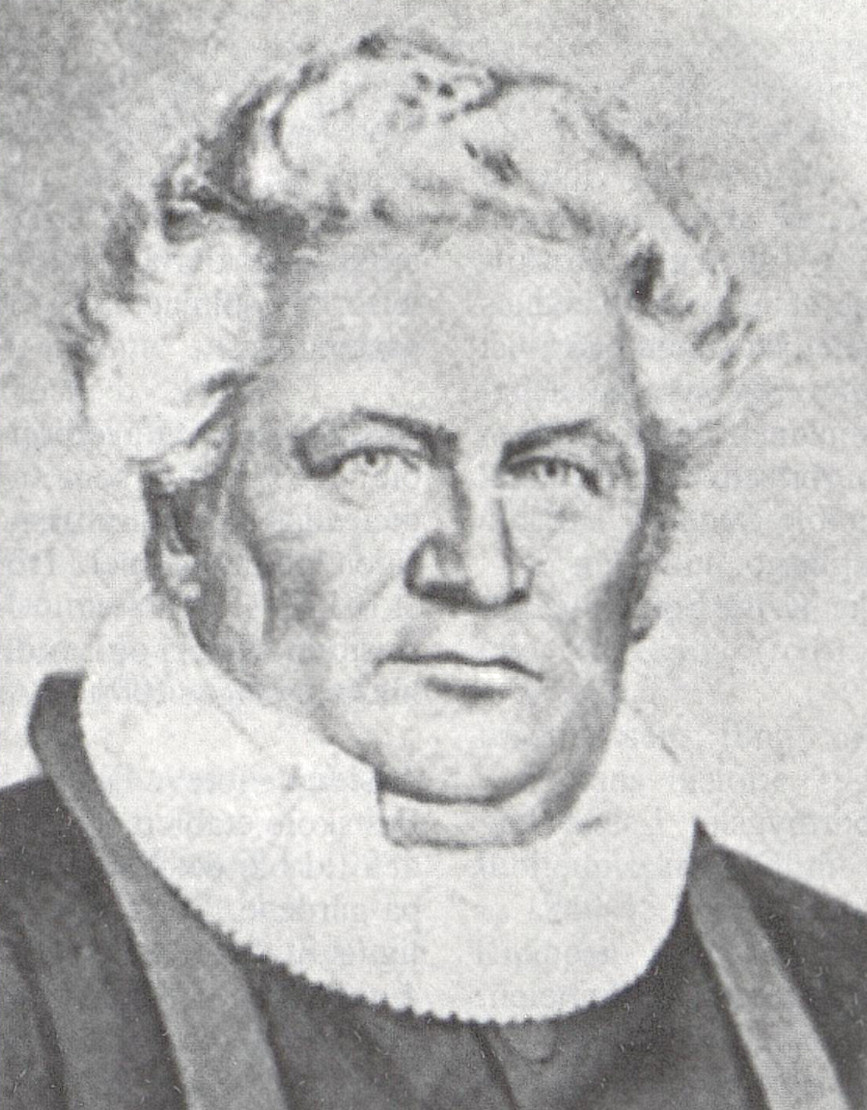
- Born: 9 March 1807; Enebakk, Norway
- Died: 11 June 1865 (aged 58); Østre Toten, Norway
- Occupations: Priest, politician
- Office: Member of the Norwegian Parliament
- Spouse: Sophie Stabell
- Children: Sophus Christian Munk Aars
- Father: Jens Aars
- Relatives: Jens Ludvig Andersen Aars (nephew) Jacob Jonathan Aars (first cousin)

Nils Fredrik Julius Aars (9 March 1807 – 11 June 1865) was a Norwegian priest and politician.

He was born in Enebakk as a son of priest and politician Jens Aars (1780–1834) and his wife. His grandfather had migrated to Norway from Aars, Denmark in 1757.

Aars married Sophie Stabell, and the couple had several children, including writer Sophus Christian Munk Aars. Nils was also an uncle of banker and politician Jens Ludvig Andersen Aars and a first cousin of educator Jacob Jonathan Aars.

He was elected to the Norwegian Parliament in 1848 and 1851, representing the constituency of Finmarkens Amt. He was a vicar there. He died in 1865 in Østre Toten Municipality.
