= Kristian Birch-Reichenwald Aars =

Norwegian academic

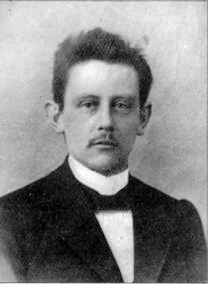
Kristian Birch-Reichenwald Aars

Kristian Birch-Reichenwald Aars (25 September 1868 – 4 August 1917) was a Norwegian academic. Originally educated as a theologian, he soon switched to philosophy and psychology.

== Personal life ==
He was born in Christiania as a son of educator Jacob Jonathan Aars (1837–1908) and his wife Anna Ernesta Birch-Reichenwald (1838–1919). He was the brother of architect Harald Aars, and a grandson of Christian Birch-Reichenwald. He was also a grandnephew of priest and politician Jens Aars and a second cousin of writer Sophus Christian Munk Aars.

Between 1895 and 1910 he was married to Marna Aall (1873–1948). During that time he was a brother-in-law of Anathon Aall and Herman Harris Aall. Anathon Aall biographed him in the first volume of the first edition of the biographical dictionary Norsk biografisk leksikon. In a later marriage, Marna Aall became mother-in-law of astronomer Rolf Brahde.

== Career ==
Aars finished his secondary education in 1887, and graduated from the Royal Frederick University with the degree cand.theol. in 1892. After completing his education in theology, he shifted to philosophy. He studied abroad from 1894, and was a research assistant under Götz Martius and Angelo Mosso. He took the dr.philos. degree in 1897 with the thesis Die Autonomie der Moral, and in the next year he was elected as a member of the Norwegian Academy of Science and Letters. From 1900 to 1914 he was a research fellow at the Royal Frederick University. His main works were Zur psychologischen Analyse der Welt. Projektionsphilosophie (1900) and Gut und Böse. Zur Psychologie der Moralgefühle (1907), both written in the German language.

He did not only hold lectures in philosophy, but also in experimental psychology and epistemology. He saw knowledge in experimental psychology as a precondition for research in philosophy. He requested the establishment of a Department of Psychology at the Royal Frederick University, but it took more than ten years before this wish materialized. The person behind the new Department was Anathon Aall, who headed it until 1937.

Aars struggled with heavy asthma for much of his life. He died in August 1917 in Kristiania.
