= Vigeland Museum =

Museum dedicated to Gustav Vigeland in Oslo, Norway

Coordinates: 59.92285°N 10.70013°E

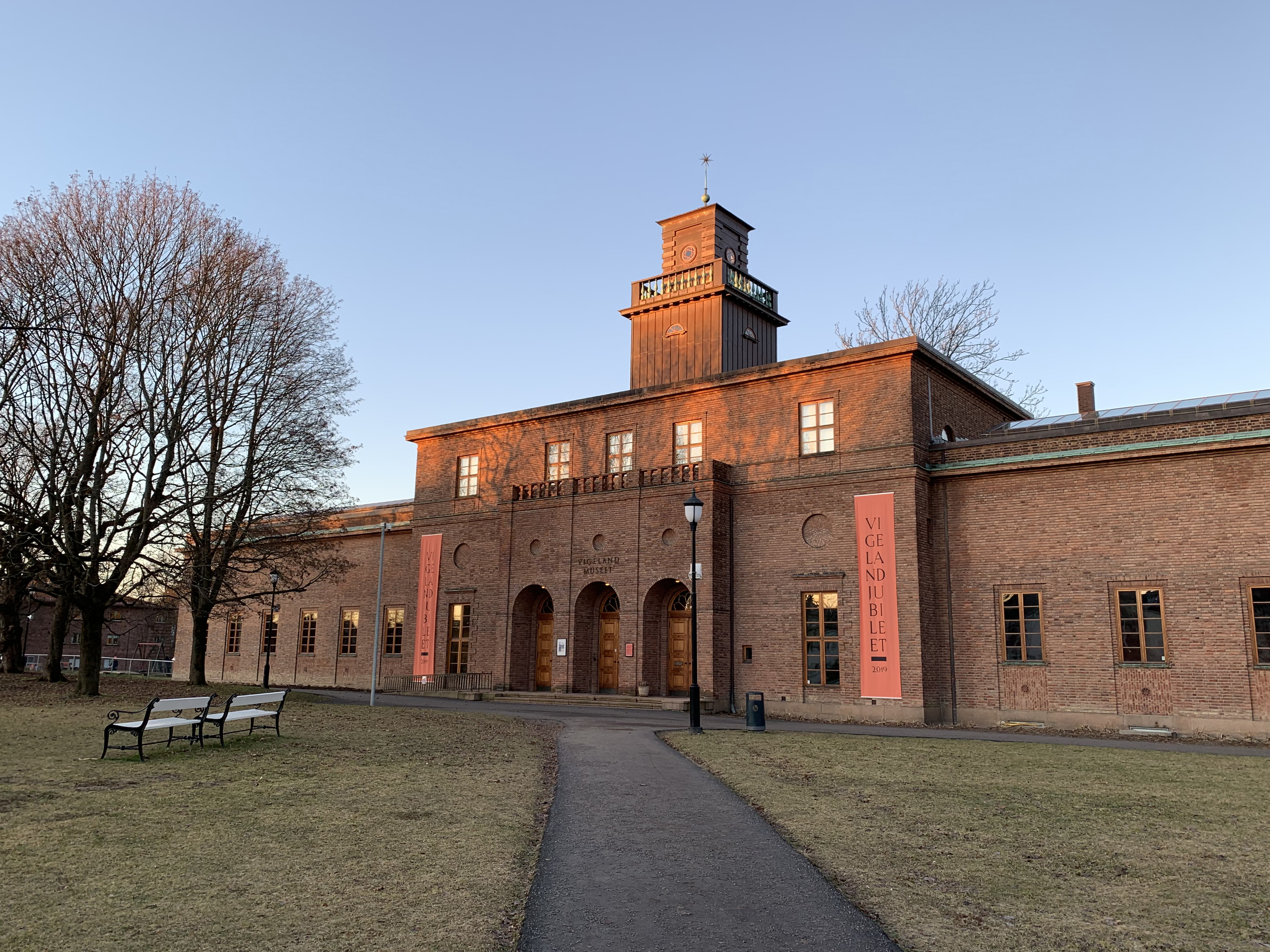
Vigeland Museum, south of Frogner Park

The Vigeland Museum (Norwegian: Vigelandmuseet (Note: Until 2020 the museum used the spelling Vigeland-museet in Norwegian; the spelling was changed to Vigelandmuseet after a long period where people often spelled it Vigelandsmuseet (with s).)) is a museum dedicated to Gustav Vigeland in Frogner, Oslo. It is located outside Frogner Park, which includes the Vigeland installation with sculptures by Gustav Vigeland. Inside the park, close to Vigeland Museum, is Frogner Manor with Oslo Museum and the Henriette Wegner Pavilion, a small art gallery.

The museum is dedicated to Norway's most famous sculptor, Gustav Vigeland (1869–1943). The museum is Vigeland's former studio and residence. His urn and ashes are located in the tower of the museum. He designed his own bronze urn and burial monument, located above his apartment on the 2nd floor. The museum is part of Oslo municipality's cultural department.

== Exhibitions ==
Today, the museum shows a permanent exhibition presenting Vigeland's art and life, and temporary exhibitions with contemporary or historical three-dimensional art. The Vigeland Museum announces tours in the apartment on their web page. Tickets must be pre-booked.

== How to get there? ==
The museum's address is Nobels gate (street) 32, just nearby Frogner Park. The tram and bus station Frogner Plass is closer to the Vigeland Museum than the station Frogner Park. The Vigeland Museum is a short walk from Frogner Park.

Immediately north of the museum is the more famous Vigeland installation in Frogner Park, which showcases Vigeland's larger statues and sculptures. The highway Ring 2 runs nearby, and buses as well as Oslo Tramway provide for public transportation. The museum is within reasonable walking distance of the stations Frogner plass on the Frogner Line, and, further away, Nobels gate on the Skøyen Line (the now-closed station Halvdan Svartes gate was proximate as well).

== The building ==
The building, which is one of Norway's foremost examples of neoclassical architecture, is designed by architect Lorentz Ree. Its history began in 1919, when sculptor Gustav Vigeland made an offer to Oslo Municipality to donate his works sometime in the future. Vigeland's total body of works consisted not only of sculptures, but also woodcuts, drawings, sketches and photographs as well as letters, other writings and a personal library. When a part of the city of Oslo where Gustav Vigeland lived and had his atelier was demolished due to city planning, an agreement between the artist and the City of Oslo came to be: Vigeland wanted an atelier. The atelier could be rebuilt as a museum after his death. Even Vigeland's flat on the third floor was preserved as a part of the museum.

The building of the would-be museum commenced in 1921, as soon as a contract between Vigeland and Oslo had been formalized. The architects were Lorentz Harboe Ree and Carl Buch, and the style was neo-classic. In 1923, Vigeland moved in, one year before the middle part and northern wing were completed. The southern wing was completed in 1930. The atelier was used by both Vigeland and other artists.

Vigeland died in 1943, during the hard economic times of World War II. The building was open as a public museum in 1947, but the official opening was June 4, 1950. The opening was partially thanks to budget surplus from the municipal cinema company Oslo Kinematografer. The museum is still owned by Oslo municipality via its etat of culture, and the current Museum Director is Jarle Strømodden.

== Publications ==
Gustav Vigeland is surrounded by myth—some true, others not. The best source for official information about Gustav Vigeland is the Vigeland Museum.

Tone Wikborg: Gustav Vigeland – A Biography (2001). Republished in English (and Norwegian) during the Vigeland 150th Anniversary in 2019.

Jarle Strømodden: Vigeland & the Park (Orfeus Publishing 2019)

Guri Skuggen: Gustav Vigeland and his Contemporaries. Bourdelle. Maillol, Meunier, Rodin (Skira 2019)

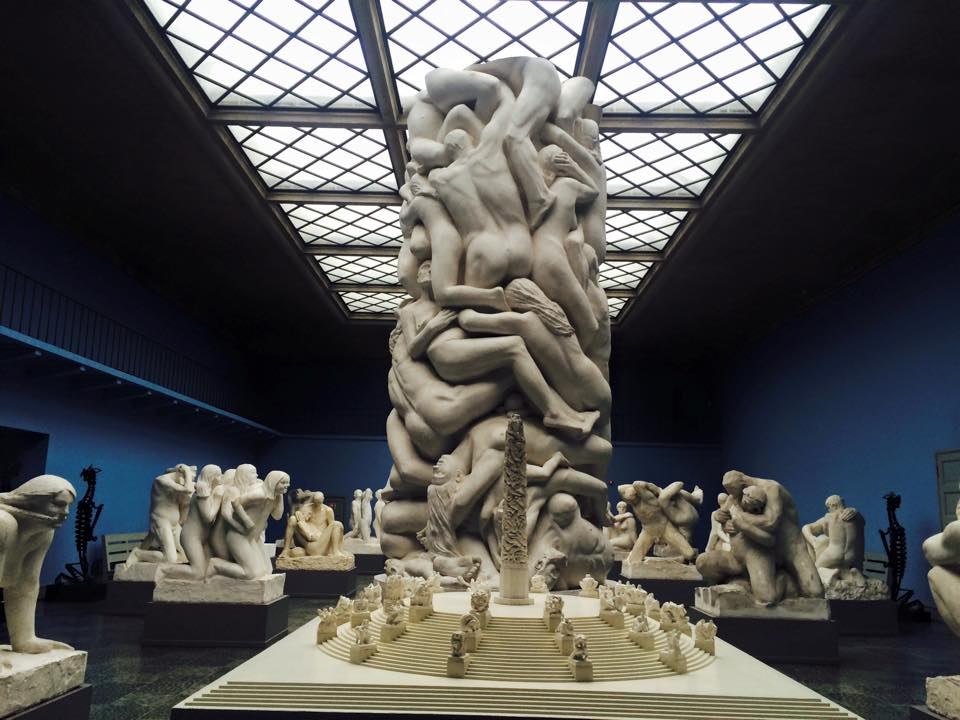
One of the exhibition halls in the Vigeland Museum.

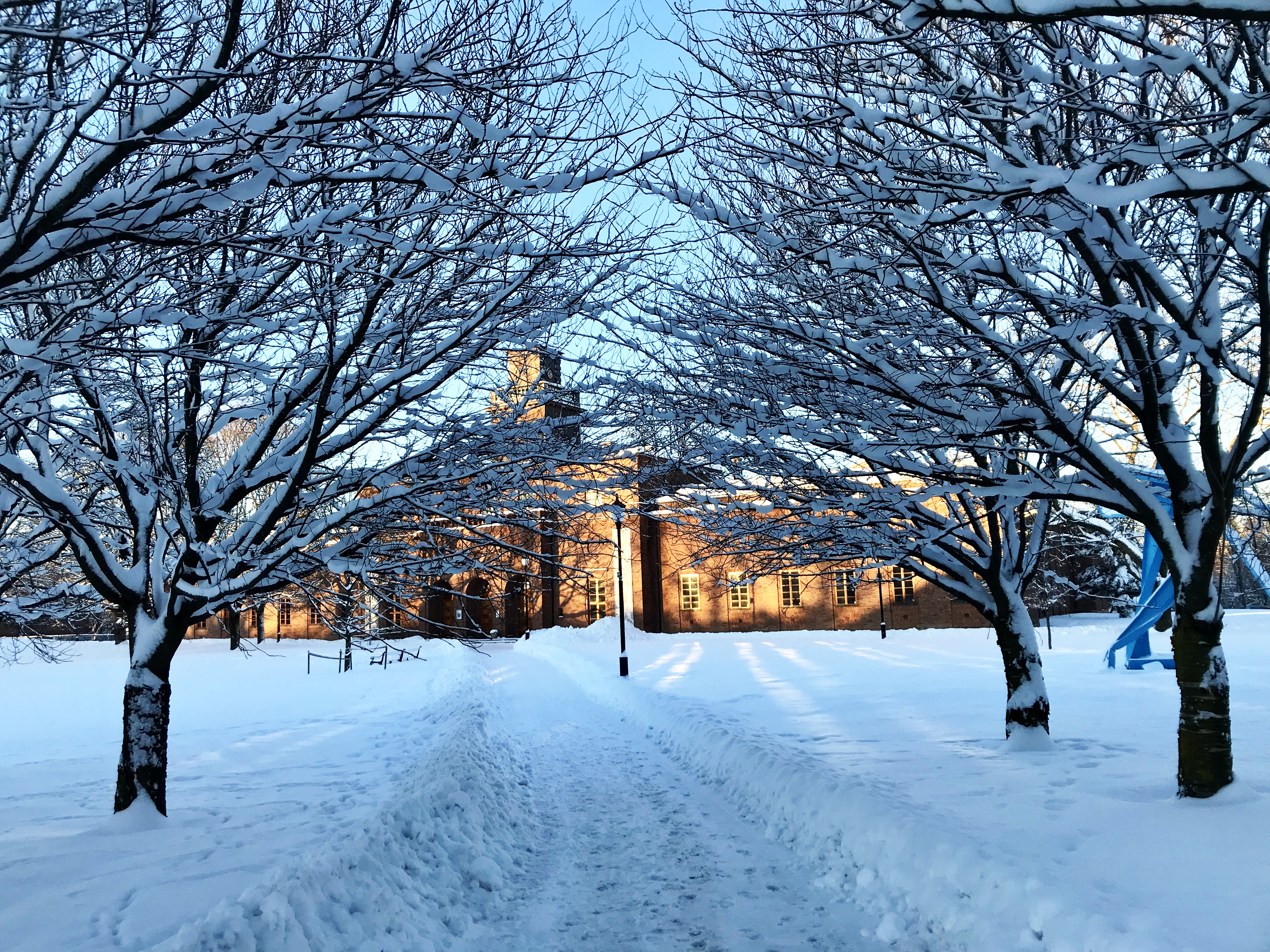
Winter at the Vigeland Museum
