= Jens Ludvig Andersen Aars =

Norwegian politician (1852–1919)

J. Andersen Aars
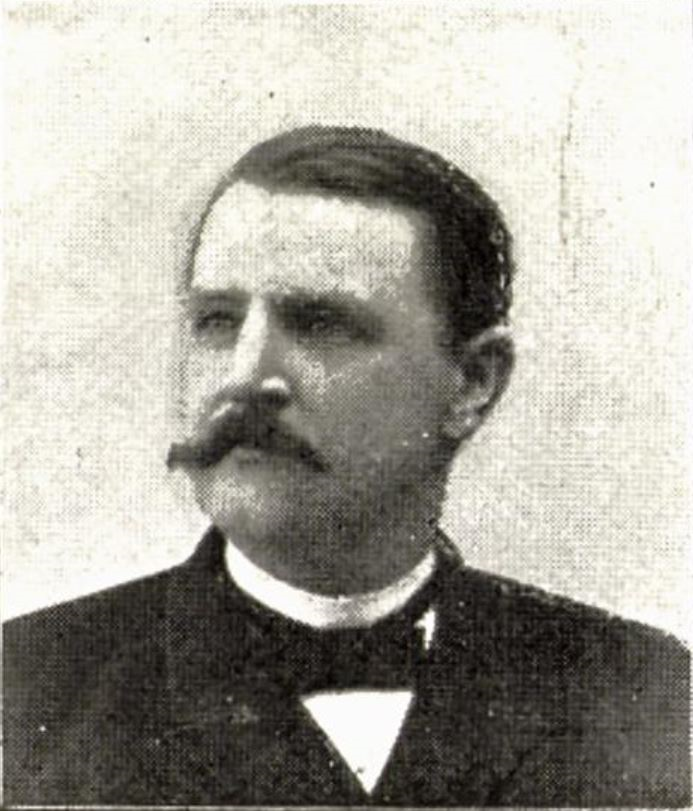
- Born: Jens Ludvig Andersen Aars; 23 December 1852; Horten, Norway
- Died: 22 May 1919 (aged 66)
- Occupation: Politician

Jens Ludvig Andersen Aars (23 December 1852 – 22 May 1919) was a Norwegian politician.

He was born in Horten as a son of Jens Ludvig Aars and Anette Lund, a nephew of Nils Fredrik Julius Aars and a grandson of Jens Aars. In October 1876 he married Hansine Henriette Vogt (1850–1921). On the paternal side she was a sister of Svend Borchmann Hersleb Vogt, and niece of Volrath Vogt, and on the maternal side she was a granddaughter of Hans Holmboe and great-granddaughter of Jens Holmboe.

Aars was known as the director of the bank Centralbanken for Norge. He was also the first chair of Oslo Chamber of Commerce. He served as mayor of Oslo from 1902 to 1904.

Political offices
Preceded by Edmund Harbitz	Mayor of Oslo; 1902–1904	Succeeded by Johan Kristian Skougaard
