= Frogner =

Borough in Oslo, Norway

Bydel Frogner
- Borough
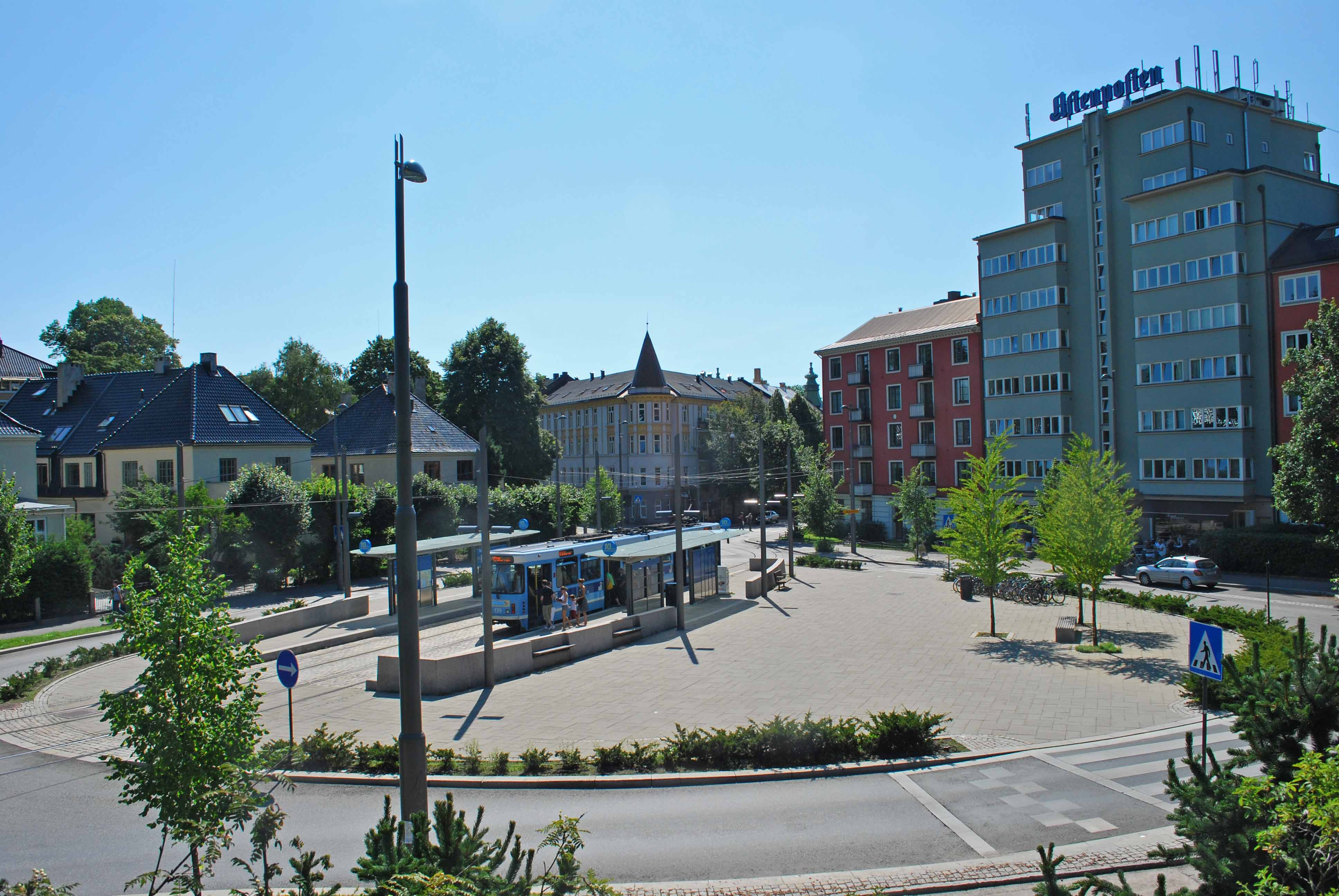
- A tram stop in frogner, August 2008

- Coat of arms

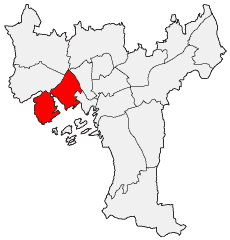
- Coordinates: 59°55′1.35″N 10°42′21.30″E
- Country: Norway
- City: Oslo

Area
  - Total: 8.3 km^{2} (3.2 sq mi)

Population (2020)
  - Total: 59,269
  - Density: 7,141/km^{2} (18,500/sq mi)
- Time zone: UTC+1 (CET)
  - Summer (DST): UTC+2 (CEST)
- ISO 3166 code: NO-030105
- Website: bfr.oslo.kommune.no

Frogner is a residential and retail borough in the West End of Oslo, Norway, with a population of 59,269 as of 2020. In addition to the original Frogner, the borough incorporates Bygdøy, Uranienborg and Majorstuen. The borough is named after Frogner Manor, and includes Frogner Park. The borough has the highest real estate prices in Norway.

== Etymology ==
The borough is named after the old Frogner Manor. The Norse form of the name was Fraunar (plural form), and is likely derived from the word frauð 'manure', thus meaning something akin to 'fertilized fields'. (Note: See also Frogn and Tøyen.)

Note that the name is commonly pronounced more closely to "Frong-nair" rather than "Frog-ner"; both are considered acceptable.

== History ==
The area became part of the city of Oslo (then Christiania) in 1878. The borough was originally the grounds of an 18th-century country estate, Frogner Manor. The manor is now the site of Oslo City Museum. The Vigeland installation is located in Frogner Park (Frognerparken)

A majority of the houses in the borough were built around 1900. Frogner has historically been and continues to be an affluent area of Oslo.

== Districts ==
Traditional districts of Oslo belonging to the borough are:

- Bygdøy
- Frogner
- Majorstuen
- Uranienborg

== Politics ==
As a borough of Oslo, Frogner is governed by the city council of Oslo, as well as its own borough council. The council leader is Jens Lie from the Conservative Party and the deputy leader is Carl-Henrik Bastiansen, also of the Conservative Party. The Conservative Party has the most seats. The 15 seats are distributed among the following political parties for the 2019–2023 term:

- 7 from the Conservative Party (Høyre)
- 2 from the Labour Party (Arbeiderpartiet)
- 2 from the Green Party (Miljøpartiet de Grønne)
- 1 from the Progress Party (Fremskrittspartiet)
- 1 from the Socialist Left Party (Sosialistisk Venstreparti)
- 1 from the Liberal Party (Venstre)
- 1 from the Red Party (Rødt)

== Frogner in modern times ==
The Bygdøy peninsula is the current site of the Viking Ship Museum, Norsk Folkemuseum (Norwegian Museum of Cultural History), the Maritime Museum, the Kon-Tiki Museum, and the ship Fram, used by Roald Amundsen for his Antarctic expedition. The royal estate of Bygdøy kongsgård and the Oscarshall palace are also located here. Bygdøy has several public beaches and is a popular recreational area.

On January 1, 2004, the previous borough of Uranienborg-Majorstuen and Bygdøy-Frogner were merged with Frogner, creating the current, larger borough.

The borough is known for its many villas and parks. It is one of the most expensive boroughs in Oslo due its central location, proximity to parks, marinas and attractive architecture, and the historical legacy of being a choice residential district for the upper classes during the 19th century.

Many of these expansive estates are now embassies, diplomatic missions, and other diplomatic representations.

== Museums ==
- The Vigeland Museum, located in Frogner Park where the artist Gustav Vigeland lived and worked for nearly two decades. . It is the world's largest sculpture park made by a single artist, and is one of Norway's most popular tourist attractions. The park is open to visitors all year round. The unique sculpture park is Gustav Vigeland's lifework with more than 200 sculptures in bronze, granite and wrought iron. Vigeland was also in charge of the design and architectural layout of the park. The Vigeland installation was mainly completed between 1939 and 1949. Most of the sculptures are placed in five units along an 850 meter long axis: The Main gate, the Bridge with the Children's playground, the Fountain, the Monolith plateau and the Wheel of Life.
- Oslo City Museum is situated at Frogner Manor in Frogner Park. It is a museum of cultural history with one of the largest collections of paintings in Norway. The history of Oslo is illustrated by thematic exhibitions showing, among other things, the development of Oslo and the city's cultural and commercial activities.

The Bygdøy peninsula - a short ferry journey from the city center - boasts several museums, including the Viking Ship Museum (Vikingskipshuset), the Kon-Tiki Museum, Norwegian Maritime Museum and the Norwegian Museum of Cultural History.

- The Norwegian Maritime Museum (Norsk Maritime Museum) was founded in 1914 and is a national museum with the responsibility to collect, research, and teach Norwegian maritime cultural heritage. A collection of Norwegian traditional boats is exhibited in the central hall and the museum also stages temporary exhibitions.
- The Norwegian Museum of Cultural History (Norsk Folkemuseum) includes the world's first open air museum when it was established in 1881. It currently features over 160 buildings from a range of rural areas in Norway. The Gol Stave Church dating from 1200CE is one of five medieval buildings at the museum.
- The Viking Ship Museum houses three spectacular examples of 9th and 10th century Scandinavian sea vessels - including the fully intact Oseberg ship - which were used as high status tombs. A collection of Viking weapons, utensils and talismans, buried with the ships, is also on display.
- The Kon-Tiki Museum is named after the raft on which Norwegian adventurer Thor Heyerdahl crossed the Pacific Ocean in 1947. Alongside the raft, the museum houses various artefacts related to Heyerdahl's other expeditions and a changing program of temporary exhibitions explores his life and work.

== Noteworthy buildings ==
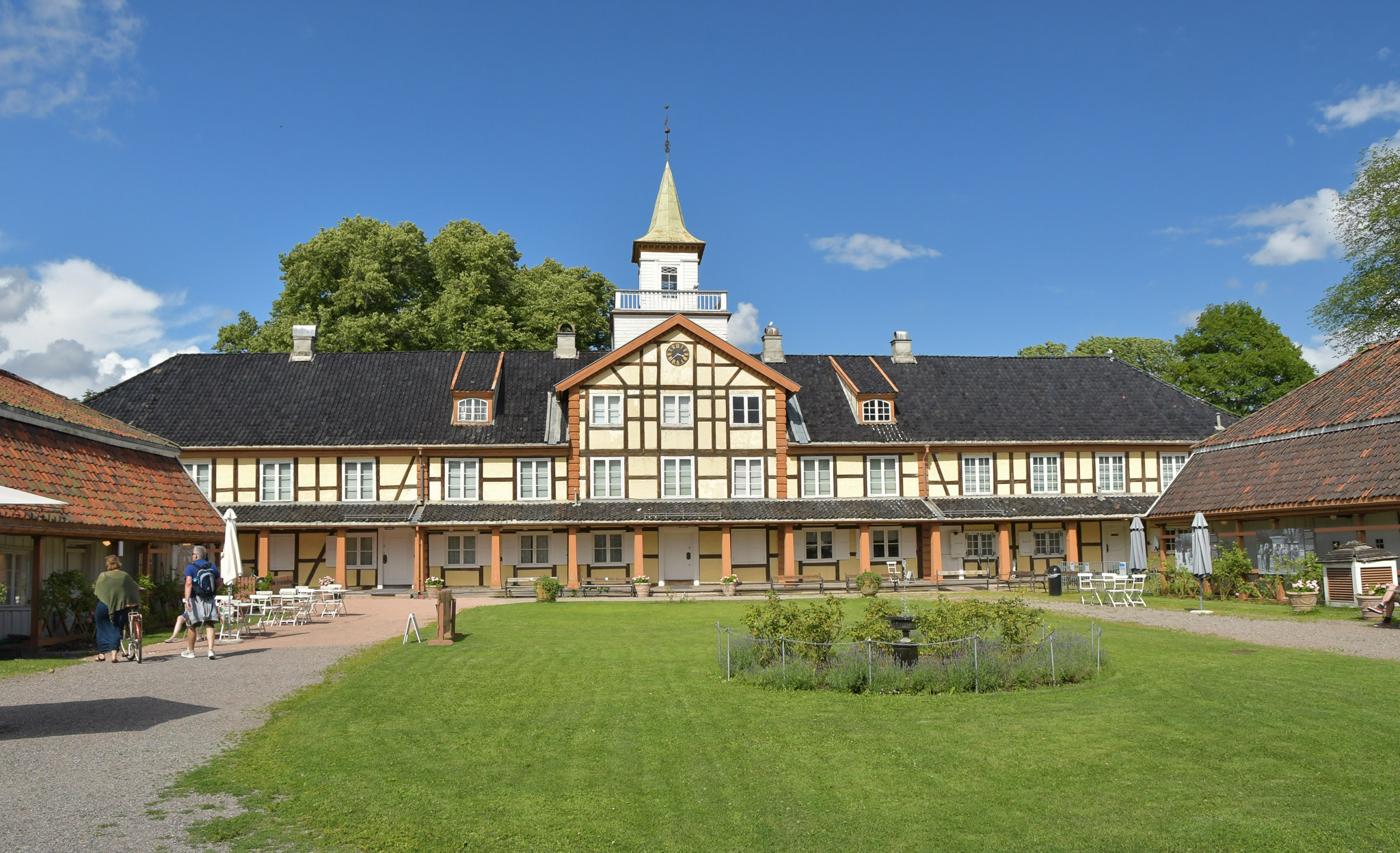
Frogner Manor

The main building at Frogner Manor (Frogner Hovedgård) dates back to approximately 1790 . Historical interiors from the late 18th century. Today the building is part of Oslo Museum. Frogner Manor is located on a former estate in an area that became part of today's borough The estate is now the site of Frognerparken.

Frogner Church (Norwegian: Frogner kirke) is a church in the Frogner borough of the city of Oslo, Norway. The congregation is part of the Church of Norway, the country's state church.

== Frogner Park ==
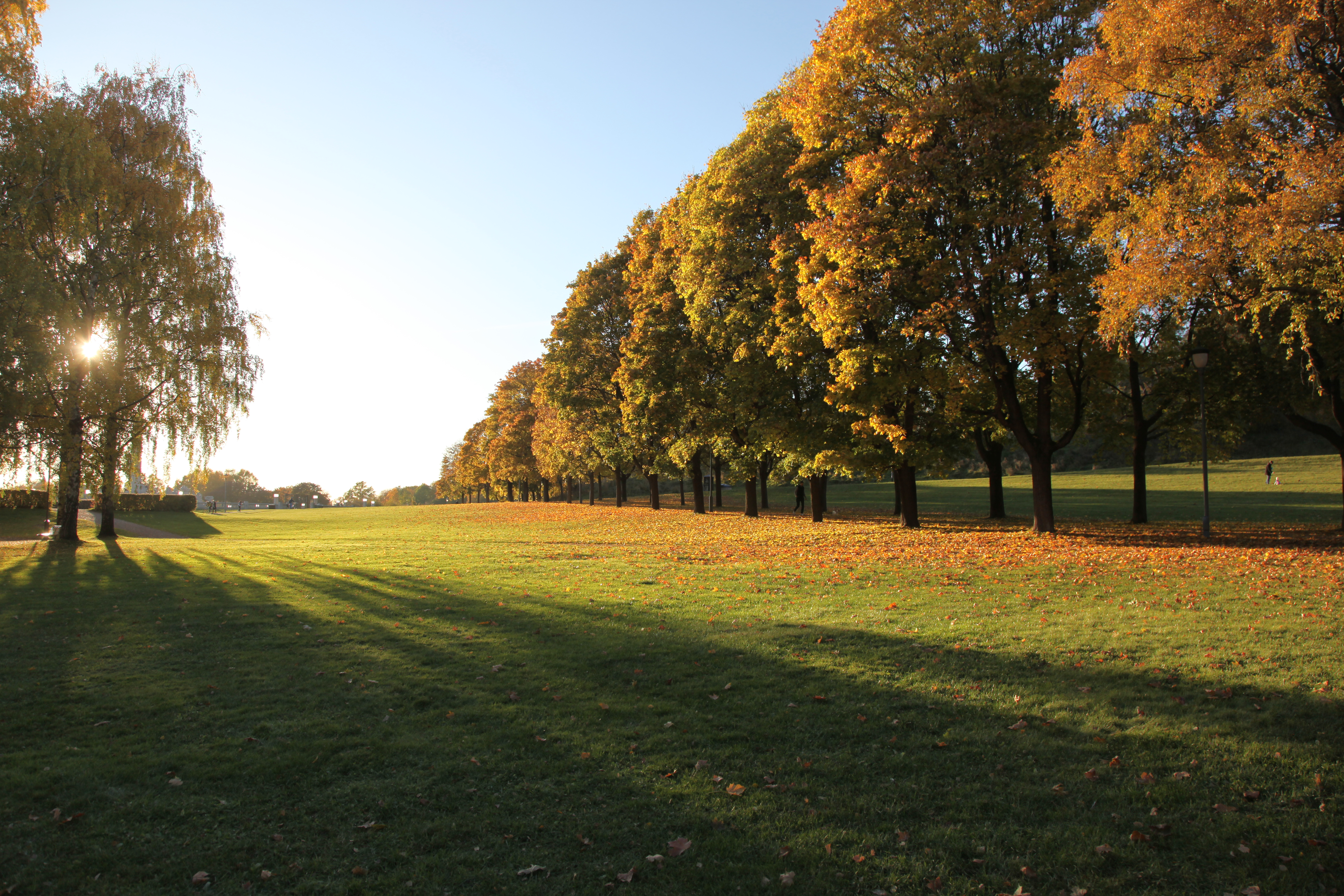
Frogner Park, October 2009

Frogner Park (Norwegian: Frognerparken), north of the city centre, is Oslo's biggest park and one of its most popular recreational areas, both for its neighbours and for people from other parts of the city. On a summer day the park is full of people who come to run, walk with a dog, picnic, play badminton or sunbathe. Frognerparken has Norway's biggest collection of roses; a total of 14,000 plants of 150 different species.

Frogner Stadion and open-air bath is located in one corner of the park, towards Majorstuen. In the corner by Frogner plass are Frogner Manor House and the Oslo City Museum. Frognerparken includes the Vigeland installation, Oslo's most visited attraction, and has a summer-open café, a restaurant and Norway's biggest playground. A large open-air skating rink, maintained only during the winter, is free of charge to visitors. Many Norwegians own their own skates, but one can also rent skates at the site or take skating lessons.
