= Bislett =

Neighbourhood of Oslo, Norway

Coordinates: 59°55′34″N 10°43′59″E

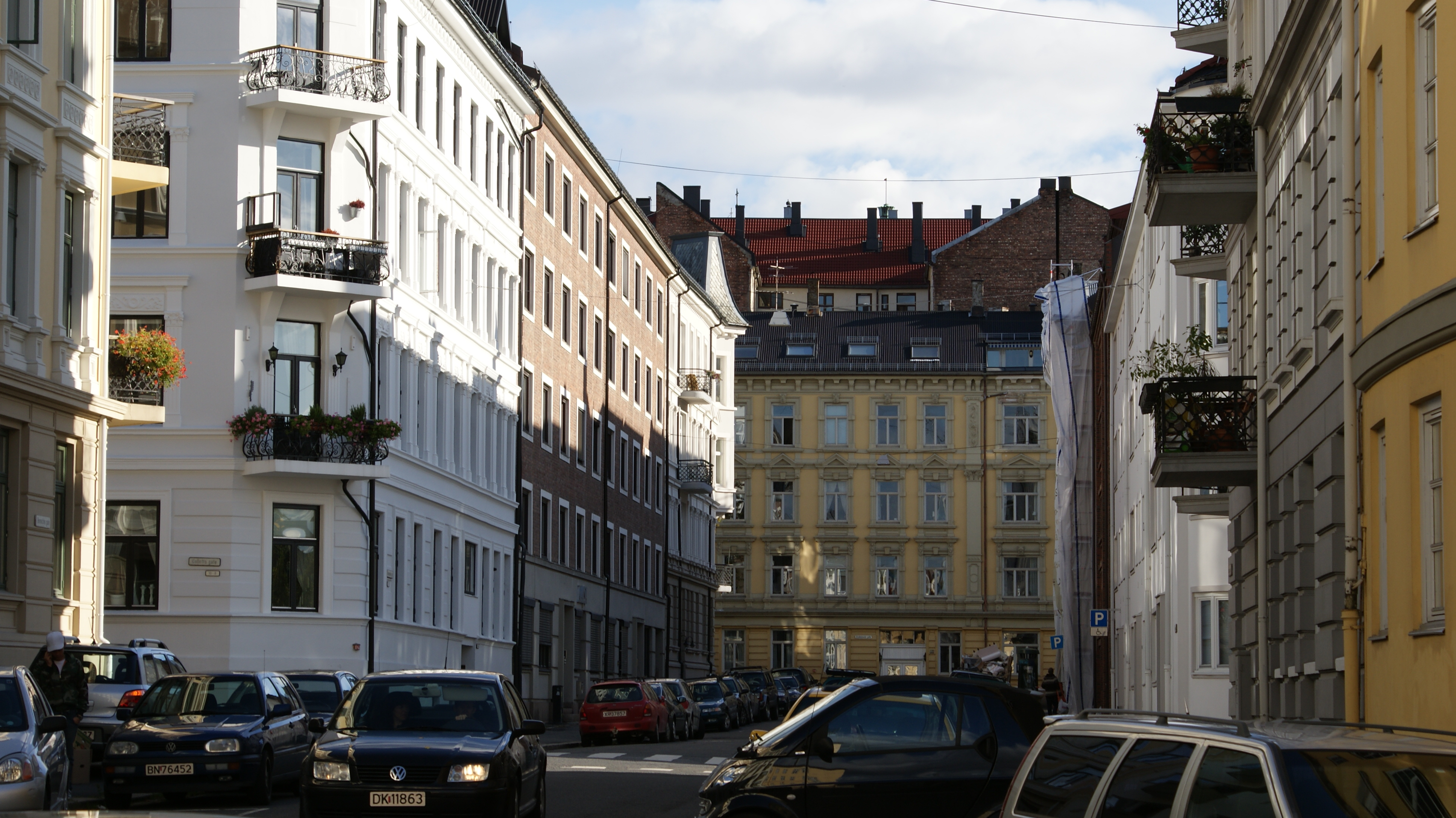
Benneches gate, Bislett

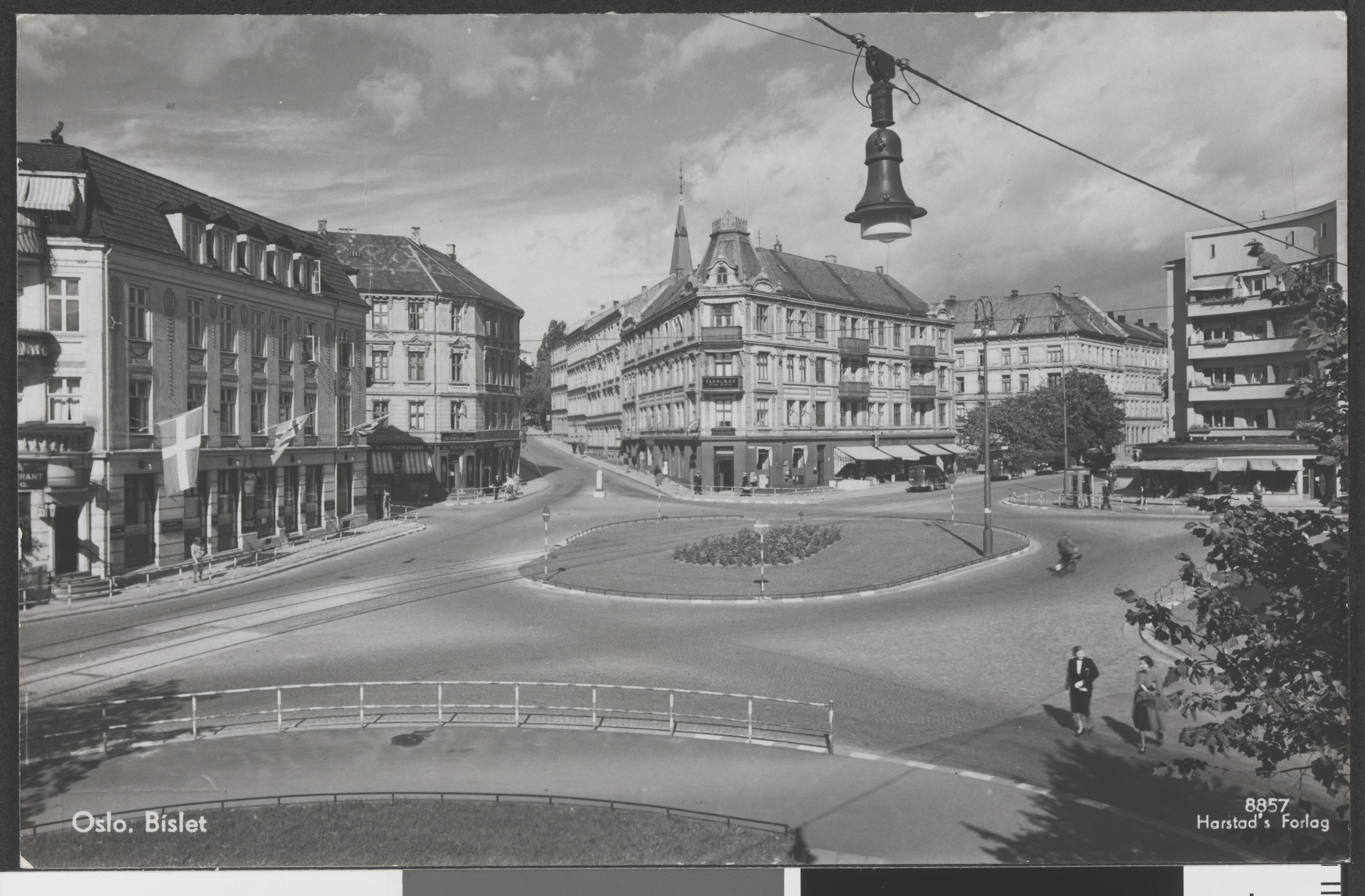
Roundabout outside of Bislett Stadium between 1940 and 1945.

Bislett is a neighbourhood in the St. Hanshaugen borough in north-central Oslo, Norway. It is internationally famous for the Bislett Games, held at Bislett Stadium.

Bislett has also become known to non-Norwegians due to being the home of the fictional detective Harry Hole, whose exploits have been translated into numerous languages.
