= Egeland =

Egeland ("Oakland") may refer to:

Places

- Egeland, also known as Aiboland and Swedish Estonia, historical region in northern and western Estonia
- Egeland, North Dakota, small settlement ("city") in Towner County, North Dakota, United States

People

- Allan Egeland (born 1973), Canadian ice hockey player
- Alv Egeland (1932–2025), Norwegian physicist
- Erik Egeland (1921–1996), Norwegian journalist and art critic
- Jan Egeland (born 1957), Norwegian politician
- John Olav Egeland (born 1951), Norwegian journalist
- John Oscar Egeland (1891–1985), Norwegian businessman in shipping
- Kjølv Egeland (1918–1999), Norwegian politician
- Lars Egeland (born 1957), Norwegian librarian and politician
- Tom Egeland (born 1959), Norwegian writer

== See also ==
- Ekland
- Ekeland
- Eikeland
