= Nansen East-West Dialogue Academy =

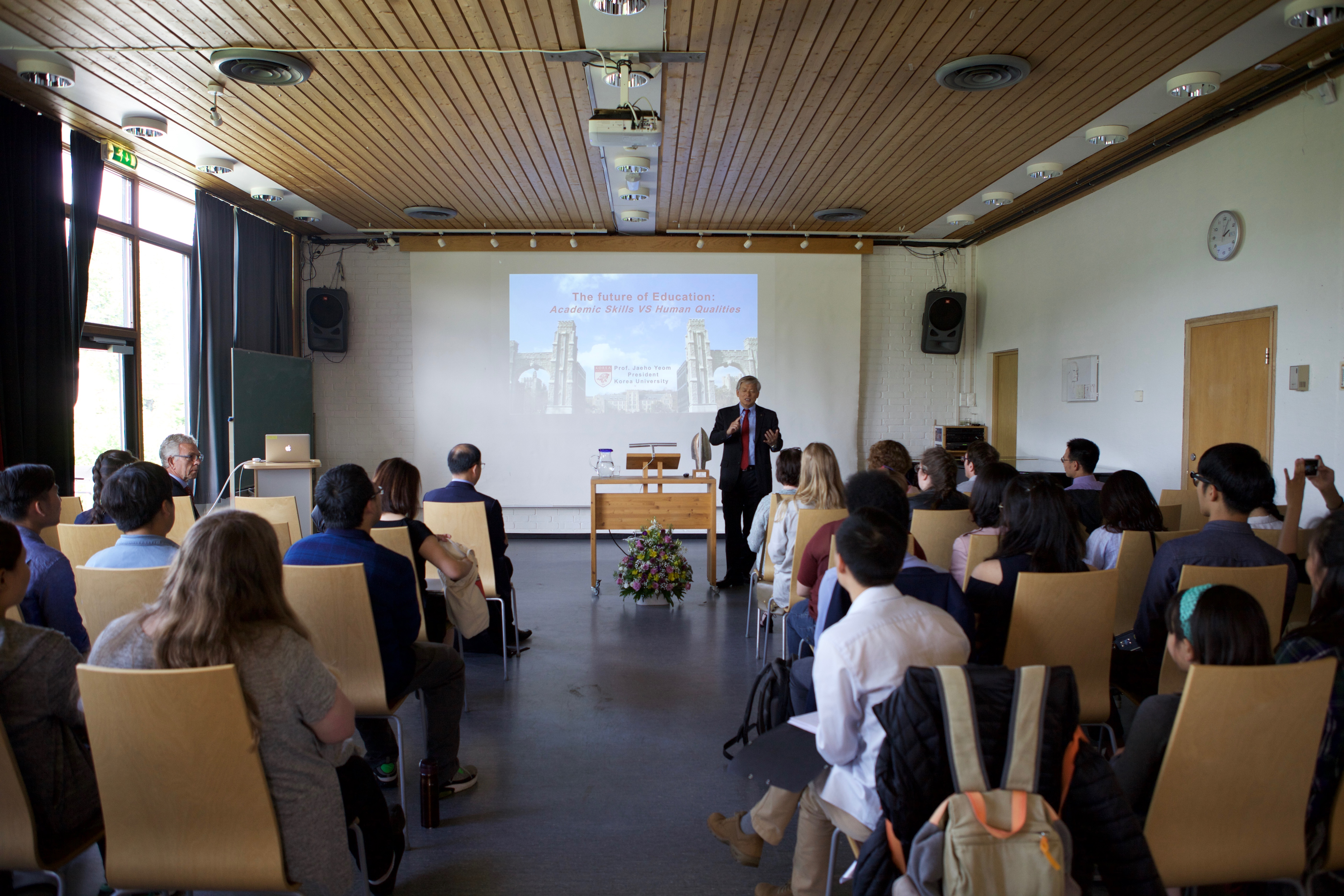
Lecture at NEWDAY 2017

Nansen East-West Dialogue Academy NEWDAY is a 10-day summer school which takes place annually at Nansen Academy in Lillehammer, Norway.

The summer school offers daily lectures and discussion groups, and seeks to provide a platform for university students from East Asia and the Nordic region to learn and debate about contemporary issues based on acquired knowledge of Eastern and Western thinkers and humanitarians. The issues dealt with are presented by scholars from leading universities in the East Asian region (China, Japan and South Korea) and the Nordic countries (Denmark, Finland, Iceland, Norway and Sweden) as well as from Europe and the United States.

Apart from its academic program, NEWDAY features excursions and outdoor and cultural activities.

== Origins ==
The first Nansen East-West Dialogue Academy NEWDAY took place in 2017 from 4–14 July.

The idea of a dialogue academy grew out of the annual course 'Understanding Asia', presented at the Nansen Academy in Lillehammer, Norway by Nordic and Asian scholars since 2014.

The Nordic and East Asian region have established cooperation bodies that are mandated to promote cooperation and mutual understanding. The Nansen East-West Dialogue Academy NEWDAY seeks to operate in line with this basic idea of promoting regional and cross-regional cooperation.

== Funding, organizers and supporters ==
The NEWDAY project is encouraged by the Nordic Council of Ministers (NCM) and the Trilateral Cooperation Secretariat (TCS). Academically it is supported by scholars at Fudan University, Tsinghua University and Shandong University in China. University partners in Japan are Kyoto University and Tokai University, and in Korea Yonsei University and Korea University are partners. In the Nordic region the Nordic Institute of Asian Studies (NIAS) at University of Copenhagen, representing a consortium of 26 Nordic universities, is the leading coordinator of the project, together with Nansen Academy in Lillehammer, Norway.

NEWDAY has received funding from the Nordic Council of Ministers (NCM), the Fudan–European Centre for China Studies and Nansen Academy, and has received support from the Trilateral Cooperation Secretariat (TCS).

== Organizers and program steering committee ==
- Geir Helgesen, Director, Nordic Institute of Asian Studies, University of Copenhagen, Denmark
- Unn Irene Aasdalen, Director of Nansen Academy, Lillehammer, Norway
- Daniel A. Bell, Professor, Tsinghua University/Dean, Shandong University, China
- Chunrong Liu, Associate Professor, Fudan University, Shanghai, Executive Vice Director, Fudan–European Centre for China Studies, University of Copenhagen, Denmark

== Student statements 2017 ==
"One of the most important parts of both the [NEWDAY] curriculum and the [NEWDAY] experience was dialogue. We both learnt about the importance of dialogue in academics and politics, and in cross cultural communication. As attendees, we were encouraged to engage in dialogue with the lecturers and each other, and different perspectives were always welcome."

"During NEWDAY we went on excursions and had many fun social events, these played a big role in the fun, accessible and vibrant atmosphere that was present."

NEWDAY Program 2017 - video made by participants of NEWDAY 2017.
