= John Egeland =

John Egeland may refer to:

- John Olav Egeland (born 1951), Norwegian journalist and editor
- John Oscar Egeland (1891–1985), Norwegian shipping leader
