= Torolf Elster =

Norwegian journalist (1911–2006)

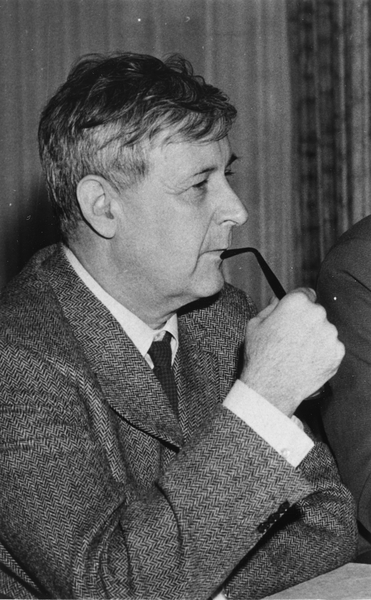
- Elster in 1967
- Born: 27 May 1911; Kristiania, Norway
- Died: 4 November 2006 (aged 95); Oslo
- Occupations: newspaper and radio journalist, magazine editor, novelist, crime fiction writer and writer of short stories
- Known for: Editor of Håndslag; Director-General of the Norwegian Broadcasting Corporation
- Notable work: Muren; Thomas Pihls annen lov
- Spouse: Magli Elster (m. 1938; died 1993)
- Children: Jon Elster Janne Elisabeth Nøkleby
- Parent: Kristian Elster
- Awards: Riverton Prize (1982); Fritt Ord Award (1986)

Torolf Elster (27 May 1911 – 4 November 2006) was a Norwegian newspaper and radio journalist, magazine editor, novelist, crime fiction writer and writer of short stories. He was Director-General of the Norwegian Broadcasting Corporation (NRK) from 1972 to 1981.

== Background ==
Elster was born in Kristiania. His parents were author and literary critic Kristian Elster, Jr. (1881–1947) and Ragnhild Poulsen (1885–1958). He was married to poet and psychoanalyst Magli Elster (née Raknes, daughter of psychologist Ola Raknes and poet and playwright Aslaug Vaa). He was the father of philosopher Jon Elster.

== Journalist and literary career ==
Elster made his literary debut in 1936 with the novel Muren. He was a sales manager at the publishing company Tiden Norsk Forlag in the late 1930s. He was a member of the communist movement Mot Dag before the German occupation of Norway 1940–1945, during which he had to flee the country. The novel Historien om Gottlob was issued in 1941. In Stockholm he edited the underground newspaper Håndslag, together with Eyvind Johnson and Willy Brandt. Håndslag was smuggled into Norway and distributed illegally. Funded by the Norwegian legation in Stockholm, it was issued once every second week, and was printed in 15–20,000 copies towards the end of the war. Elster was also a commentator in Norsk Tidend.

Elster was a foreign editor for Arbeiderbladet from 1945 to 1946, and editor of the labour movement's magazine Kontakt from 1947 to 1954. He then wrote for Arbeiderbladet for almost ten years, from 1954 to 1963. During this time he also wrote several non-fiction books, mainly political literature: Frihet og demokrati (Freedom and Democracy, 1947), Øst og Vest (East and West, 1948), Sosialismen under debatt (Socialism Under Debate, 1950) and Sovjetmysteriet (The Soviet Mystery, 1957). He started working as a program manager for the Norwegian Broadcasting Corporation in 1963, and was Director-General from 1972 to 1981.

Elster was awarded the Riverton Prize for the crime novel Thomas Pihls annen lov (1982). In 1986 he and Magli Elster were awarded the Fritt Ord Award. He died in 2006 in Oslo.

Media offices
Preceded by Hans Jacob Ustvedt	Director-General of the Norwegian Broadcasting Corporation; 1972–1981	Succeeded by Bjartmar Gjerde
Awards
Preceded by Den illegale presses forening	Recipient of the Fritt Ord Award; 1986 (shared with Magli Elster)	Succeeded by Nansen Academy
