= Magli Elster =

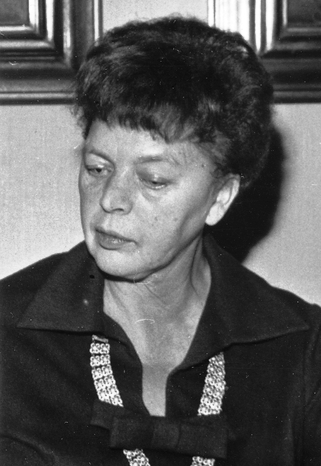
- Magli Elster in 1966
- Born: Magli Raknes; 21 November 1912; Kristiania, Norway
- Died: 11 May 1993 (aged 80); Oslo
- Occupations: psychoanalyst, literary critic, poet and translator
- Spouse: Torolf Elster (m. 1938)
- Children: Jon Elster
- Parent(s): Ola Raknes; Aslaug Vaa
- Awards: Fritt Ord Award ( 1986)

Magli Elster (née Raknes; 21 November 1912 – 11 May 1993) was a Norwegian psychoanalyst, literary critic, poet and translator. She received the Fritt Ord Award, jointly with her husband Torolf Elster.

== Personal life ==
Elster was born in the neighborhood of Vålerenga in Kristiania (now Oslo), Norway. She was the daughter of psychologist Ola Raknes (1887–1975) and poet-playwright Aslaug Vaa (1889–1965). She grew up partly in Vålerenga, Kviteseid and Paris. She was married to writer and Director-General of the NRK Torolf Elster (1911–2006) and was the mother of philosopher Jon Elster.

== Career ==
Elster received psychoanalytic training in Prague from 1934 to 1937, and practiced as psychoanalyst from 1937 to 1943. From 1947 to 1985 she was assigned as literary critic for the newspaper Arbeiderbladet.

She made her literary debut in 1952 with the poetry collection Trikken går i engen, a cycle of poems, following life in Oslo, the capital of Norway, over a year. Her literary breakthrough was the collection Med hilsen fra natten from 1953, which included love poetry with erotic motives. Further collections are Den syngende flåten from 1955, En pike av tre (1959) and Sekundene (1971).

Being a literary critic, Elster chaired the association Norsk Litteraturkritikerlag from 1959 to 1969. She was a co-founder of the Association Internationale de Critiques Litteraires. She also translated literary works into Norwegian language.

In 1986 she and her husband Torolf were awarded the Fritt Ord Award, for having described their encounters with refugees from various parts of the world.

Awards
Preceded by Den illegale presses forening	Recipient of the Fritt Ord Award; 1986 (shared with Torolf Elster)	Succeeded by Nansen Academy
