= Unn Irene Aasdalen =

Danish-Norwegian philosopher and journalist

- Born: 26 February 1963 (age 63)
- Title: Journalist, historian, editor

Unn Irene Aasdalen (born 26 February 1963) is a Danish-Norwegian philosopher and intellectual historian. She is a former journalist and editor of the Norwegian Press. From August 2013 until August 2021, Unn Irene Aasdalen was the director of Nansen Academy – Norwegian Humanistic Academy in Lillehammer, Norway. She now holds the position of associate professor, leader of the study programme for International Politics at The Nansen Academy.

Unn Irene Aasdalen holds a Cand.Phil. in Philosophy from the University of Copenhagen and a Ph.D. in Italian Renaissance philosophy from the University of London. Her particular fields of interests are Renaissance humanism, Neoplatonism and political philosophy.

== NEWDAY ==
In 2017 Unn Irene Aasdalen initiated the Nansen East-West Dialogue Academy NEWDAY, together with Geir Helgesen (University of Copenhagen), Daniel A. Bell (Tsinghua University and Shandong University) and Chunrong Liu (Fudan University and University of Copenhagen). The Nansen East-West Dialogue Academy NEWDAY organizes a summer school providing a platform for university students from East Asia and the Nordic region to engage in a dialogue in global challenges. NEWDAY was motivated in a strong belief that global and cross-cultural conversation and collaboration are urgent and necessary peace promoting activities. The NEWDAY summer course takes place at Nansen Academy at Lillehammer, Norway. The most recent event took place in 2026, with the next scheduled for 2028

== Renaissance studies ==
Unn Irene Aasdalen founded, together with Professor Marianne Pade at the University of Aarhus, Nordisk Netværk for Renæssancestudier (NNRS), the Nordic Network for Renaissance Studies in 2010. She chaired the NNRS from 2010 to 2016. During these years, three international Renaissance conferences were arranged by the NNRS: in Copenhagen 2012, in Stockholm 2014 and in Oslo 2016. Marianne Pade is from 2016 chairing the NNRS.

From 2012 to 2016, Unn Irene Aasdalen taught at and was a co-organizer of a Renaissance summer school Text-Memory-Monument. The summer school was arranged by the University of Aarhus, Denmark, in cooperation with the Nordic institutes in Rome. Unn Irene Aasdalen was in 2015 one of the founders of the Norwegian Network for Renaissance Studies.

From 2005 to 2010, Unn Irene Aasdalen taught courses in Renaissance Studies at the University of Copenhagen. From 2008 to 2012, she held a post.doc at the Institute for English, Germanic and Romanesque Languages at the University of Copenhagen. She received a research-grant from the Carlsberg Foundation for writing the book Den gjenfødte Eros: Kjærlighetshistorier i den italienske renessanse (Eros Reborn, Platonic Love Theories in the Italian Renaissance), 2013, Scandinavian Academic Press. From 2008 to 2013, she taught courses in international politics, political philosophy and art history at Johan Borups Højskole in Copenhagen.

== Journalism and international politics ==
Unn Irene Aasdalen was from 1994 to 1996 the cultural editor of the Norwegian daily newspaper Arbeiderbladet. 1994-1995 she was a member of the board of the Norwegian weekly newspaper Morgenbladet. From 1986 to 1994 she was affiliated with the Norwegian daily newspaper Dagbladet, as a journalist, writing feature stories and articles on culture and foreign politics. In the years 1984-1987 she wrote articles for Ny Tid, Universitas og Friheten. From 1984 to 1986 she was the editor of the Socialistic Youth magazine Press, and from 1985 to 1987 she edited the cultural magazine Kontrast, together with Christine Amadou.

1988-1989 Unn Irene Aasdalen was politically wise chairman of European Youth (Europæisk Ungdom) in Denmark, and represented the organization in JEF, Jeunesse Européens Fédéralistes. From 1984 to 1987, she was a member of the central executive committee of Socialistic Youth in Norway.
