= Ola Raknes =

Norwegian psychologist

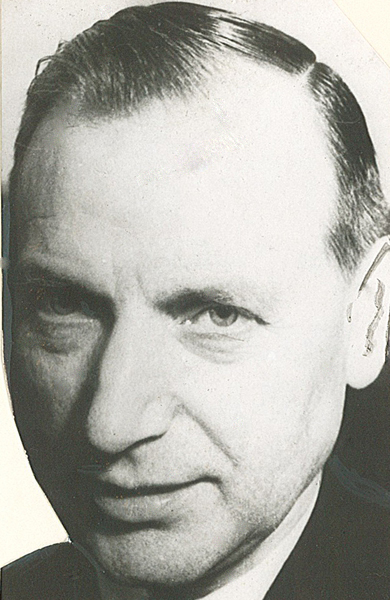
- Born: 17 January 1887; Bergen, Norway
- Died: 28 January 1975 (aged 88); Oslo, Norway
- Occupation: Psychoanalyst
- Spouse(s): Aslaug Vaa (1st marriage); Gjertrud Bonde (2nd marriage)
- Children: Magli, Anne, Tora, Tor, and Erik (of 1st marriage); Ada (of 2nd marriage)
- Parent(s): Erik Askildson (Askjellson) Raknes; Magdali Olsdotter (née Raknes)

Ola Raknes (17 January 1887 – 28 January 1975) was a Norwegian psychologist, philologist and non-fiction writer. Born in Bergen, Norway, he was internationally known as a psychoanalyst in the Reichian tradition. He has been described as someone who spent his entire life working with the conveying of ideas through many languages and between different epistemological systems of reference, science and religion (Dannevig, 1975). For large portions of his life he was actively contributing to the public discourse in Norway. He has also been credited for his contributions to strengthening and enriching the Nynorsk language and its use in the public sphere.

Raknes was known as a thorough philologist and a controversial therapist. Internationally he was known as one of Wilhelm Reich's closest students and defenders.

== Family ==
Ola Raknes was the son of the farmer Erik Askildson (Askjellson) Raknes (1856–1926) and Magdali Olsdotter (born Raknes) (1859–96) and grew up at the family farm of Raknes in Hamre Municipality on the island Osterøy in the Osterfjorden fjord near Bergen in a strict pietist environment. There were altogether 10 children of whom 7 grew up to become adults, and five of his siblings emigrated to the United States. He was married twice: in his first marriage in 1911 with Aslaug Vaa (1889 – 1965, the marriage was dissolved in 1938) they begot the children Magli (1912–1993), Anne (1914–2001), Tora (1916–1995), Erik (1919–) and Tor (1923–). The second marriage in 1941 with Gjertrud Bonde (1913–1975) gave him the daughter Ada (born 1952).

== Studies and work side by side ==
Ola Raknes attended folkeskole (primary school) on the neighbouring farm and then worked for a while on the family's farm prior to enrolling at middelskole (the next higher level in the education system of that time) in f. After that he graduated from the Hambros skole in Bergen in 1904. He took his examen artium as private candidate at Kristiania katedralskole in 1907. During the winter of 1907–08 he joined the elephant seal-catching vessel Solglimt to the Crozet islands in the southern Indian Ocean to collect plants and animals for the university in Kristiania. A liverwort, Jamesoniella raknesii was named after him. During the summers between 1910 and 1916 he served his military draft duty.

Ola Raknes took on miscellaneous teaching positions in the years between 1910 and 1914 and worked as a journalist from 1914 to 1916 in the newspaper Den 17de Mai ("the 17th of May") while at the same time continuing his studies. In addition he worked during this period as a hotel worker. In 1915 he took his cand. philol. linguistical-historical "embedseksamen" (a public exam required for most professional positions in the public sphere) with Norwegian language as major subject and English and French as minor subjects. His major thesis was about Egill Skallagrímsson. In 1916 he was headmaster at Larvik higher school for one year. In 1917 he got a position as lector in Norwegian language and Norwegian literature at Sorbonne in Paris, and he spent the four years here earnestly by studying general psychology, psychology of religion, biology, sosiology, and furthermore medieval literature, medieval philosophy and theology on the side of his teaching position. He continued these studies when, after Sorbonne, he began as lector in Norwegian at University College in London where he stayed from 1921 to 1922.

Ola Raknes' working capacity was widely spoken of, and during a period he worked both as secretary for Det Norske Samlaget, while at the same time working on the dictionary and preparing his doctoral thesis in psychology of religion, Møtet med det heilage ("Encounter with the Holy"), which was published in 1927. The dissertation which was also published as a book (and republished again in the 1970s), investigates the phenomenon of religious ecstasy in view of what was then recent findings and theories in the fields of ethnology, but particularly in psychology and psychoanalysis. In 1924 he went on to finish studies in pedagogy. Apart from this he also worked as a literary translator. Raknes studied psychoanalysis at the Berlin Psychoanalytic Institute from 1928 to 1929 and later at the Orgone Institute in New York City in 1946. From 1929 on he had a private practice as psychoanalyst. He published some popularized essays on psychology which he collected in the book Fri vokster which was published in 1949. This was the first book which introduced Wilhelm Reich's theories and therapeutical practice to a Norwegian audience (Dannevig, 1975).

== Working for the Nynorsk ==
In May 1908 Ola Raknes, then still a student, became manager and handyman for Norskt Maalkontor (literally "Norwegian language office"), an office dedicated to promoting the still young Nynorsk language. In this job which he had until 1910 he dealt with book sales and administrative chores for Det Norske Samlaget. He provided the momentum behind book publications as well as sales, and he brought the accounting into order, since it hadn't been attended to for the last three years. Being the first secretary of the Samlaget he made a significant contribution to the establishing of its first real administration in a time period when publishing in Nynorsk was starting to become self-sufficient (Skard, 1975). Ola Raknes joined the Studentmållaget i Oslo (A pro-Nynorsk organization among students in Oslo) which was founded in 1900, and he attained a central position, among other things he was elected chairman in 1913 but had to renounce the position. In later times he would serve as an often used speaker both in the 20s and 30s. Already as a student Ola Raknes published French-Norwegian Wordlist. Having returned from London he began working on English-Norwegian Dictionary, which was produced between 1922 and 1927. This as well as French-Norwegian Dictionary, which was written between 1939 and 1942, were both written for the "school book committee" within the Samlaget, where Raknes was a board member between 1915 and 1917.

Ola Raknes loved poetry, and together with I. C. Grøndahl he published the first Norwegian literature history volume in English in 1923. He was an appreciated literary translator, both of scholarly as well as artistic prose. He was the philological supervisor of Henrik Rytter's ten-volume translation of Shakespeare. Sigmund Skard writes of the two dictionaries which Ola Raknes wrote (Skard, 1975), that far from being mere glossaries, they were very personal works which again reflected the quest of Ola Raknes for his identity. Skard compares this work with that of Ivar Aasen more than 50 years earlier. Aasen had made his way through the entire tributary of Norwegian folk speech and compared it with another Nordic language: Danish. Skard writes that Raknes, "with strong power of empathy, integrated the values of two of the largest and oldest European cultural languages, procured everything that they possessed, from past to present, and confronted that with his own linguistic heritage and his personal linguistic sense. To check himself he drew in the living present-day speech in one of the richest East Norwegian rural dialects, in collaboration with his first wife, the poet Aslaug Vaa, as well as her father, the farmer Tor Vaa. Long into the future will these books be the daily benefit to everyone who works with the Norwegian language."

Both the school book committee and to some extent the popular writings committee of which he was also a member from 1911, acted as schools in publishing where the students had to deal with all aspects of book publishing: market evaluations, editorial reviews, recruitment of authors, practical editorial chores, deals with publishing houses or printers, distribution, marketing and economy. Ola Raknes' dictionaries were reputedly so meticulous that even the most abject taboo words were included, and they became important tools in the cultural struggle of the Nynorsk movement. From 1922 to 1930 he again worked for the Samlaget, this time as secretary to the board, however, in reality he was director of the publishing house. Raknes also translated several works of fiction as well as non-fiction into Nynorsk. He did a groundbreaking job in establishing a philological and psychological terminology for the language.(Dannevig, 1975) Raknes was deeply involved in the Nynorsk movement, which included the Høgnorsk movement, and he was a founding member of Norsk Måldyrkingslag ("Norwegian society for language cultivation") in 1928.

== From childhood through early adulthood ==
=== Religious longing ===
Already at a very early age Ola Raknes was intensely occupied with religion. It was particularly the thought and the fear of Hell which these ruminations centered on. Sometime between the age of seven and eleven he began to wonder about what the saved people told, that by repenting they had begot, or been allowed to take part in, a new and better life, a life which the non-repented didn't know of and could not comprehend. He had a vague sense of them being right in some way, but at the same time he felt that they also were wrong. He had an opaque reminiscence of once having experienced this life, in his own words from the time he was about 3 or 4 years old, "when he was a church-builder". Later he considered this to have been a child's way of expressing that he had known another life before. From about the age of ten and several years onward he attempted to come in contact with this other life. He went to edifying meetings in the village, and he often attended church, although he, just like the saved people, figured that that in particular was less important because it was a lesser likelihood that a conversion would start there. It was a constant fear of ending in Hell which spurred him, because he was certain that was where he would go if he failed in finding his way to the new life.

Despite all his toils he never succeeded in attaining religious conversion. He felt that it would be dishonest of him if he stood up and testified the way some of his friends had done, that he had been graced, and he was also very ambivalent about believing whether all those who did so were totally honest. In hindsight Raknes found that partly what held him back was a fear of relinquishing.

=== Discovered determinism ===
During Christmas break, shortly before he turned 17, he stumbled across a booklet about determinism. With the exception of some popularized scientific articles by G. H. Armauer Hansen, this was the first literary encounter he had which made him doubt the religious teachings which he had received until then. Even though he would later forget most of the content of the booklet, it made him consider the belief in eternal Hell without sense, and it also provided him with courage to trust his own thoughts and feelings a lot more than he had previously dared. When a little later he told his best friend, county school director Per Erdal, about his newly gained perspective on Hell, he was joyed to hear that his friend shared his view. The keen interest in religion would now lose its grip on Raknes for a number of years, and the interest in a life after death disappeared, never to return.

In the years both before and after he, as a twenty-year-old, got his examen artium, it was common practice among his comrades to make jokes about and with both religion, philosophy and psychology, which was deemed more or less as superstition or play with empty words. Raknes felt that such subjects were unfit for someone who had set out to do something useful with his life, which he had. When he began to study philology after secondary school, he was hoping that the goals and literature which he would study were going to show him a field where he felt that he had a particular calling. However, as absorbing as many subjects seemed at first, none offered to him the labor which would consume him fully. And he felt likewise when it came to the women: He met many whom he liked and also many which, in retrospect, he believed also were fond of him, but during this time it felt like no woman could ever love him – even though that was what he longed for more than anything else.

=== Falling in love and first marriage ===
He was twenty-four and a half years old when he experienced his first big love affair since childhood, an event which he experienced as both a revelation and a revolution. Up until this time he had felt as if life only moved ahead in front of him, he being merely a passive spectator. From now on he felt that he lived and that he was himself a part of life, even though he still hadn't found his particular slot work-wise. Ola Raknes and Aslaug Vaa met in the Studentmållaget i Oslo. They also were colleagues as journalists for the newspaper Den 17de Mai ("May the 17th" a now defunct Nynorsk newspaper, at that time one of the nation's most subscribed to. The name is a reference to the date of the Norwegian Constitution Day). It was the interest for intellectual activities which brought them together, believed Aslaug's sister-in-law Thora Vaa (married to Aslaug's brother Dyre Vaa)(Fyllingsnes, page 11). The next years would be focused on more hands-on work: the philology studies, money that had to be earned, as well as an unceasingly growing family. The first daughter, Magli, was born in Oslo the year after Ola and Aslaug married. The family was constantly moving about the first years, and the second daughter, Anne, was born at the Vaa family farm in Kviteseid Municipality in Vest-Telemark. In between they had been living in Paris where Ola and also Aslaug were enrolled as students, and they also moved back to Paris in 1919. They lived in Rue Bonnard in a milieu of Norwegian artists, Henrik Sørensen and Dagfin Werenskiold being their closest neighbours, but hanging out with the artists was more to the liking of Aslaug. When Aslaug caught typhus and had to return home to Norway after two years in Paris, the two youngest of the then four children went with her while the two oldest, Magli and Anne remained in Paris together with Ola. After the stay in Paris the family lived for about a year in Kviteseid again. Then it moved to an apartment block in Johan Bruns gate at Adamstuen in Oslo which Ola Raknes had bought. There they lived for four years. Following that they moved to Lysaker (just outside Oslo's western city limits) where they remained until 1932–33. By then Ola had begun making enough money so that they once more could move back to Oslo (Fyllingsnes, p. 6).

As the 1930s went on, the marriage began to fall apart. Ola Raknes became more absorbed by psychoanalysis while Aslaug Vaa found her path in writing poetry. Her debut occurred as late as 1934. Their marriage ended on a bitter note in 1938, following years of separate living.

== Interest in the religious ==
=== Religious debate ===
About the time he turned thirty he got involved in a newspaper debate with the school man Jakob Naadland and bishop Peter Hognestad concerning reward for good deeds. The other two believed that man requires a promise of reward to be able to stay on the straight path. Ola Raknes, however, asserted, "that it is natural for man to love and be good, those are fundamental characteristics of man and needs no other 'payment' than to have the opportunity to function freely" (Raknes, 1959). Subsequent to this debate he started reading different books, mostly at random, about foreign religions, primitive as well as culture religions.

=== Religion studies ===
In the same year, 1917, Raknes commenced his four years as lector of Norwegian language and literature at Sorbonne in Paris, and he had planned his stay such that he would get the opportunity to study of his own heart a portion of the time. The first thing he wanted to study was the relationship between French and Norwegian literature in the Middle Ages. He started to read Joseph Bédier's great work about Les Légendes Épiques, a work which stunned him and convinced him that if he was ever going to understand the effects of Medieval French literature and its influences, he would also have to know something about Medieval philosophy and theology. Consequently, he contacted the university's professor of these subjects, François Picavet, studied several of his books, attended his lectures, and had several talks with him. Picavet possessed the enviable quality of making compendia when he had worked on a subject, where he summed up the development up through the present time. In this fashion Raknes started to read William James' book The Varieties of Religious Experience, the one book that would make the strongest impression on him above all others, and which later he would translate to Nynorsk. This was the first time that he had experienced that religion was dealt with as a natural phenomenon, and which in any case attempted to free itself from how the religions perceive themselves. He spent many weeks working his way through this book, and he walked about completely absorbed with new thoughts and feelings. Looking back, he writes that most of his friends looked upon him as if he were a loony, although a couple of artists appeared to envy him. On his last birthday, shortly before he died, Raknes described William James as the person who had had the greatest significance in his life (Dannevig). The revelation brought on him by this book was what he had been waiting for and which would show him a field of work to which he could apply himself wholly, one which in any case had importance to him, and maybe also to a lot of others.

Raknes now experienced that he could understand the religions from the "inside", even though he himself didn't believe in any dogmatic religion. This would have to be his task, he felt; to point out what really was true and valuable in religions and at the same time how there had entered into each single religion so much that was not true, but quite the contrary, inimical to life. His yearning to obtain further information grew strong. He needed concrete knowledge, both about the various religions, about philosophies of religion, about ethnology which provides backdrop and fertile ground for the different religions, and about life in all its appearances. He started to read as much as he could in all of these fields, partly at random, and at the university he attended lectures, classes, and seminars in general psychology and psychology of religion. psychopathology and psychiatry, and in biology. Raknes read the basics of the French school of sociology, works by among others Durkheim, Mauss, and Lévy-Bruhl, and he read numerous books about mysticism. His favourite was Les grands mystiques by Henri Delacroix, who was his teacher. He also read the main works of the then fledgling psychology of religion which had its origin predominantly in America, and of ethnology he read among other things a series of books by Roman Catholic missionaries

Raknes continued these studies when, after Sorbonne, he started in a position as Norwegian lector at University College in London where he stayed between 1921 and 1922.

=== The source of true religion ===
What Raknes intended in this manner was for him to be able to explain and demonstrate his strong conviction, which he knew he was yet unable to prove. "I wanted to be able to explain and demonstrate my own conviction, which already from the outset I perceived to be true, even though I was aware that I wasn't able to prove it. The conviction was that the source of all true religion is an inner experiencing of life and growth and contact with something outside of one's own narrow self. In its narrowest form, you can have this experience localized in a wound healing, in its widest form, it is a sensation of communion with the entire universe. At first I meant to call this experience 'growth consciousness'." (Raknes, 1959)

=== Back in Norway ===
After three years abroad, Raknes's finances were at a low point, and all time had to be directed toward financially profitable work. He taught languages and literature in high schools and wrote his English-Norwegian dictionary. It was not until 1927, after he had turned 40, that he was able to complete the book he had begun contemplating when he was in Paris, and begun working on in London. The book was Møtet med det heilage ("Encounter with the Holy"), and the next year he received his doctorate based upon it.

In the later years of his life Raknes explained: "I count myself a religious man, but I am an opponent of all dogmatic religion. The core of all religion is a certain experience both of oneself as a unit and of the unity between oneself and the universe." (Raknes, 1959)

== From psychology of religion to psychoanalysis ==
From his work with the psychology of religion, Raknes had come to the conclusion that he needed some method for investigating the subconscious if he was to go further in understanding human behaviour. That time, at the end of the 1920s, no such method existed except for psychoanalysis. In 1928, for that reason, Ola Raknes finished up his school work and moved to Berlin and began studying at the Berlin Psychoanalytic Institute with a grant from the Nansen fund. From this point he was lost to philology with the exception of finishing his French-Norwegian dictionary, which had contributed to make it possible for him to go to Berlin. While he attended apprentice analysis in Berlin with Karen Horney (who was later known as a "neo-Freudian"), he got convinced that psychoanalytic therapy was a vocation well suited to his abilities and interests. After having delivered a lecture to the Berlin chapter on "Viewpoints on psychoanalytical psychology of religion" in 1929, he was selected as member of the International Psychoanalytical Association. In the lecture Ola Raknes clearly stated his opposition to Freud's theories on religion. Raknes experienced progression in his new field of activity, and despite strong opposition from large parts of the medical profession, he was in the process of making a name for himself.

=== Energy- and body-based forms of therapy ===
==== From classical psychoanalysis to the character analysis of Reich ====
Ola Raknes was always searching for improvements of the therapeutic technique, and he was also dissatisfied with the traditional psychoanalytical explanatory models for man's basic drives, instincts, and aggression, and he was skeptical of the psychological dualism of Freud's theories of these contradictory basic drives, which at first moved between the instinct for self preservation and sexuality, and later between the life instinct (Eros) and the death instinct (Thanatos). It was during his stay in Berlin that Ola Raknes heard Wilhelm Reich's name for the first time, but there would still be some years before he read anything by Reich. He was still busy studying Freud and other "orthodox" psychoanalysts. It was after Reich had published his book Charakteranalyse in 1933 that Ola Raknes in earnest began moving toward Reich's teachings. Following that book Raknes absorbed himself in Die Funktion des Orgasmus, then in Reich's articles in various psychoanalytical journals, and finally in Reich's own Zeitschrift für politische Psychologie und Sexualökonomie. Ola Raknes found it all to be most interesting and rich in perspective, however, this did not cause him to change either his basic attitudes or his psychotherapeutical technique.

==== 1934 – Meeting Wilhelm Reich ====
Ola Raknes met Wilhelm Reich for the first time at the Scandinavian psychoanalysts meeting in Oslo in the Easter of 1934. Raknes was very much impressed by this strong personality, and the succinctness of his presentations and with which he presented himself during discussions about core elements of the themes that he discussed, helped Raknes attain a clearer understanding of many things. Wilhelm Reich's starting point was the psychoanalytical theories of Freud, but as early as 1925, based on experiences gained through volunteer work at his counselling clinic in Vienna for people with sexual problems, he began developing his theory of sex economy, a work which would continue until 1938. Raknes' first choice would be to commence apprentice therapy with Reich immediately, however, he had no way of travelling to Sweden where Reich was working at that time. In any case, they met again in August that same year on the 13th psychoanalytical congress in Luzern. There Ola Raknes, together with the two other Norwegian participants, professor of psychology Harald Schjelderup and child psychiatrist Nic. Hoel (who would later change her name to Nic. Waal), vehemently protested the blackballing of Reich from the International Psychoanalytical Association (I.P.V.). The Norwegian contingent was later at the congress approved as a distinct group, and this meant they could admit Reich in their membership. Wilhelm Reich did not, however, accept the offer of becoming a member when he moved to Norway later in 1934. At that time Raknes had already started in apprentice therapy with Otto Fenichel, whom he counted as one of Reich's friends and co-workers. He had from the outset told Fenichel that he would have gone to Reich if Reich had been in Norway.

==== Character analysis and apprentice therapy with Reich ====
Shortly after Reich had arrived in Norway, he opened a seminar in character analysis. Raknes was admitted to this despite not having undergone any such analysis himself. He tried out the techniques that he learned on a couple of his patients, with fairly good results. In the fall of 1936 he asked if Wilhelm Reich would accept him for apprentice therapy, both because of personal problems and because he thought that Reich's therapeutic approach was far more efficient than the classical Freudian technique which he had applied so far. Reich was in doubt and felt that Ola Raknes was a bit old and too armored, but in the end he accepted. Ola Raknes was probably one of the first patients to whom Reich consistently applied his new technique, which he labeled characteranalytic vegetotherapy. Not surprisingly, due to Raknes' advanced age, the restructuring of his character, that is the apprentice therapy, was cumbersome and lasted for almost three years, three sessions a week. The response did not fail to appear. At times everything felt so destitute and hopeless that he doubted whether he would ever be able to do the work that he still believed he was created to do, in a way he himself would be content with – and if he couldn't manage that, there would be no reason to live even. But after a long period of time he finally began noticing that the energies started to make themselves felt; he started noticing what took place inside of his own organism, and what it would mean to be functioning freely. He was struck by the fundamental differences between characteranalytic vegetotherapy and traditional psychoanalysis. Even though he had read Reich's book on character analysis, and he had also applied the technique on his own patients, having the technique work on his own body was something altogether new. Compared to classical psychoanalysis, the technique was now extended to the interpretation of character expressions and bodily attitudes, and to working through somatical blockings through direct manipulation. (Raknes, 1959)

==== Characteranalytic vegetotherapy ====
In his practice Raknes emphasized assisting people in working through to the living in themselves and work to release the innate propensity for development, the "free growth". The way of doing this was by removing the obstacles and blockages standing in the way, and this in turn would be effected when the person learned to acknowledge him- or herself, together with their thoughts, feelings and impulses. The most important part of this was to integrate body perception – to feel what one wanted, to yield to the urge if nothing of significance gainsayed it. In the article "Life and Religion" Raknes pointed to Wilhelm Reich's definition of life as a continuous process consisting of rhythmical shifts between mechanical tension, bioenergetic charge, bioenergetic discharge, and mechanical relaxation. In it he wrote, "Most people are going to need a certain amount of practice in noticing their own bodily states before they can experience this life rhythm. But then they are clearly going to experience it, in particular in two guises: in the rhythmical flow that penetrates the entire body when it is able to freely go along with the breathing, and particularly intense in the state popularly called 'living together', that is in the sexual orgasm".

==== The orgone energy ====
Even though Raknes conceded that the orgone theory of Wilhelm Reich – an expanding of Freud's libido concept to encompass a general life energy, which Reich called orgone – wasn't exhaustively proven with reference to the natural sciences' demands for proof, he felt that from his own observations and experiences it must have some merit. In the book Wilhelm Reich and orgonomy (written in English, but translated into many different languages), which he wrote a few years prior to his death, he explains in an educational and easy-to-comprehend manner the theory and its implications for various scientific disciplines, and in relation to society. How Reich was apparently able to make use of this energy in producing rain, using a so-called cloudbuster, a technical apparatus which is said to focus and project orgone energy, Raknes was himself a witness during a visit to Reich's estate "Orgonon" in Maine in 1953:

There had been a drought that had lasted for weeks, and the weather report predicted continued drought across the Eastern United States. Then Reich pointed the apparatus at a certain point in the sky and left it on for an hour and a half. If this is correctly set up, he said, we are going to experience rain within 8–9 hours. And quite correctly. After 8 hours we received an 8-hour streaming downpour across some tens of square kilometers surrounding the apparatus! An experience of that sort makes a certain impression. (Gabrielsen, 1962)

Six times after the war Raknes traveled to the US to visit Reich, and to keep his skills and knowledge up-to-date with respect to the development of Reich's theories and methods. Then, upon his return to Norway, he would replicate as much as he could of the observations and experiments that he had witnessed in Reich's laboratory, experiments which constituted the foundation for the discovery of the bions and the orgone energy in the body.

Raknes was of the opinion that what Reich had discovered was what others before him had described, but then using other names, such as animal magnetism, chi, and prana. Raknes also believed that such phenomena as telepathy and clairvoyance were real, and felt that the only thing that would cause scientists to deny their existence was narrow-mindedness and dogmatism (Gabrielsen, 1962). He believed that continued investigation and research into the orgone energy would possibly shed light on these phenomena.

Factors drawing Raknes toward the orgone theory were his lifelong curiosity and interest for the origin of religions, the religious experience and how it shapes man, and he felt it could contribute in shedding light upon these areas on a scientific basis. Furthermore, he felt that it constituted an expansion of therapeutic treatment, from being a limited psychotherapy to deserving to be called a biotherapy.

=== Active as a therapist until the end ===
Ola Raknes had his treatment room in the basement of his home at Nordberg in Oslo, and there he also had his own "orgone closet" where his patients sat in order to be supplied life energy, a so-called orgone accumulator. He was sought after in many locations around the world, and as late as in his last year of living, albeit tired and marked by illness (Skard, 1975), he traveled to Denmark, Germany, France, Italy, England, and the United States, to visit friends, give lectures and receive patients in orgone therapy. He treated a total of 800 patients, and on his last working day he received five patients.

Ola Raknes' work as a psychotherapist is being continued by several psychologists in Norway and also branched to other countries, in particular through Gerda Boyesen and David Boadella, both students of Raknes, who later established institutions for education of therapists in London and Switzerland, respectively.

In 1972, at the age of 85, he initiated the founding of the "Forum for karakteranalytisk vegetoterapi" (this was also the name of a journal which was established in 1992) to assist in recruiting new vegetotherapists (being then at a low point).

== A notable figure in public discourse ==
His support for Wilhelm Reich when he was barred from the International Psychoanalytical Association in 1934 has already been mentioned. During Reich's residency in Norway between 1934 and 1939 there were vituperative debates over his theories and practice, and Ola Raknes was one of his strongest apologists. During the so-called Reich strife in the fall of 1937 and throughout 1938 the criticism that was leveled at Reich's theories and methods, in particular from traditional psychiatry, was unusually harsh. The attacks, some of which deteriorated to mudslinging and slander, were often strongly emotional, and Ola Raknes was among those of Reich's proponents who countered the criticism, which was most forcibly promulgated by the psychiatrist Johan Scharffenberg who insinuated that Reich merely pretended to be a physician, that he performed illegal medical treatment, and that Reich had wanted to perform electrical measurements on insane patients having sexual intercourse (Stai, 1954), and later by physician Gabriel Langfeldt (Raknes, 1939). Both in conjunction with the strife surrounding Reich in Norwegian public discourse, and later, during the resistance which Ola Raknes was met with in his work being an exponent for a controversial branch of psychotherapy, what Raknes "would represent, was founded on one ground only; his own experience and his scientific conscience. He was not someone merely parroting his great teacher. Nor was he an errand-boy; as a therapist he was in time going to speak out with professional authority. And the only thing that drove him, was what he believed to be the truth. In this respect he showed no deference, and cared not how others might judge him." (Skard, 1975)

=== Journal editor ===
Raknes organized study circles and was also involved in Reich's journal projects Zeitschrift für Politische Psychologie und Sexualökonomie (published 1934–1938) and Tidsskrift for seksualøkonomi (Norw. "Journal for sex economy", one issue only published in 1939) which he was editing together with Odd Havrevold.

=== Growing recognition ===
After Wilhelm Reich had left Norway for the United States in 1939, few people associated with the community of Norwegian psychoanalysts where longer willing to defend his teachings. Even the American Reich supporters were according to Raknes "disappointingly orthodox" (Dannevig, 1975). The only people left to carry on Reich's work appeared to be Ola Raknes and Nic. Waal, and following the death of Waal in 1960, Raknes was sometimes condescendingly referred to as "Reich's last disciple". Nevertheless, several psychiatrists had confidence in him, and his matter-of-fact style and all-over good reputation as a therapist saw to it that the demand from would-be patients never relented, in particular from abroad. And for the last 10–15 years of his life Ola Raknes was met with unanimous professional acceptance and veneration. (Skard, 1975; Kile, 1989). One among many, actor Sean Connery came to Oslo in 1967 to receive treatments by Ola Raknes (Haga, 2002), something which, for the first and only time, made the popular media give attention to his work, as they created a commotion outside his practice (Kile, 1989).

== Raknes and his influence on Wilhelm Reich ==
The collaboration and friendship between Ola Raknes and Wilhelm Reich would last through to Reich's death in an American prison cell in 1957. Most people have assumed that the influence between the two for the most part has gone from Wilhelm Reich to Raknes, but this may not be the full picture. In the preface to the book Det levande i muskelpanseret ("The Living inside the Muscular Armor") which was published the same year Raknes died, another Reich therapist, Einar Dannevig, writes, "With his modest appearance and infinite loyalty toward his friend, Raknes contributed to a distorted image of himself. He is easily perceived as a loyal and grateful student of the great master even where he expressed opinions of his own which were hard fought for and well tested, Not until after he had turned 80, he wrote in the preface of his book Wilhelm Reich and Orgonomy: 'Some developments of Reich's ideas are due to myself and I am unable to tell, in some cases, which ideas were first mentioned by me, and which ones by Reich'. The fact that this is mentioned this late in a small preface of the best and probably most integrated presentation of Reich's life work having been written, has made many people overlook the fact that Raknes to a higher degree than any other has been co-creating in the development of those ideas which today form the foundation for the advanced development in different disciplines that one sees as the aftergrowth after Wilhelm Reich. With his firm integrity and independence, coupled with realizations which Raknes had arrived at through his studies in psychology of religion, philosophy, and psychoanalysis before meeting Reich, Raknes becomes a true friend and associate to Wilhelm Reich. With his lacking need for prestige, he was able to satisfy Reich's unusually strong demands for outward loyalty, while at the same time acting tactfully as a correcting agent when Reich in his later years could become the victim of his usually creative, but sometimes too lively and lonely imagination. With his more thorough philosophical background and acquaintance with philosophy of science, as well as his manifested ability to systematize, Raknes has meant very much to the development of the psychotherapeutic, biological, and natural philosophical theories that are usually ascribed to Wilhelm Reich alone." (Dannevig, 1975)

== Left-wing society involvement ==
As he took part in the shaping of society, both the Norwegian and in general, he was focusing on the forces that frustrate and impede free life expression, in the areas love and work both. He was deeply influenced in this by Reich's sex economical sociology and mass psychology. He was a member of Norwegian Democratic Group and he joined the circle of people centering on Orientering in 1953. He was a member of the Socialist People's Party also from that year, and that party's successor, the Socialist Left Party. His opinion was that the making conscious of the individual's bodily-psychological awareness, to which he could contribute through his work, had to progress hand-in-hand with societal changes – in the working place, in family life and in neighborhoods. He felt that the way society was organized created dependent individuals. Those family types and norms for child rearing which were prevalent created overwhelming sensations of angst, helplessness and feelings of littleness in the small child when its vital urges and needs – sexual or related to contact with other people, or other still – were thrashed, rejected or ignored. This in turn, Raknes felt, led, in the adult individual, to a necessity, in order for it to survive, for adaptation through one of two life strategies – either a constant, compulsive striving for power and competitive mentality, or equally compulsive attempts to ingratiate with those in power, through self-effacing submission and dutifullness. Ola Raknes thus placed the focus on the connection between current character traits in Norwegian society, such as feelings of either superiority or inferiority, competitiveness and self-effacing dutifullness, and characteristic structural traits in society itself such as concentration of power and bureaucratic control, in which the former provides fertile ground for the latter. (Grønseth, 2004)

== A rare aptitude for communication ==
Out of all that he wrote, it was the article from 1953 whose title in English was "The Orgonomic Concept of Health and its Social Consequences" that Raknes himself valued most highly. It presents a comprehensive psychological and biological perspective of the term health and has garnered praise from many directions and has also been translated into many languages. Many people have nevertheless asserted "Liv og religion" ("Life and Religion") to be Raknes' best article, originally a lecture given to the 4th Nordic Psychologist Meeting in 1956 and which deals with the living, the very feeling of being alive. It has been described as "a wise man's integrated understanding of what he has encountered in life, but also an encompassing, non-confessional faith." (Dannevig, 1975) Characteristic of his seemingly rock solid grasp of language as a tool for the conveying of thoughts, Raknes, being a lifelong proponent of the radical Nynorsk language, presented his speech in an "impeccable, pure in style and somewhat conservative Riksmål (a very conservative variant of the Bokmål language) in consideration of the Danes." (Dannevig, 1975)

== With focus on the child and the living ==
=== Free child rearing ===
Ola Raknes was a strong proponent of providing freedom to the child so that it could make its own experiences instead of being told by adults how to perceive things: "Children always pick their own ideals. As soon as we put up ideals for them, they will start cheating on themselves. They are the ones who should make the choice." (Gabrielsen, 1962) In one of the essays in the book Fri Vokster ("Free growth") Raknes elaborates on how he as a psychologist sees the child's developmental dynamics being critically dependent on being given the opportunity to learn for itself to regulate such matters as going to the bathroom, what and when to eat and when and how much it wants to sleep, through experiencing and through practicing to master, without the adults spurring the child on.

Such moral rules as not to inflict harm on others or to abstain from stealing, Raknes believed children had to find out about on their own, not through admonitions or prohibitions from the parents: "I believe that when a child lies, it is because it has been punished for telling the truth. And when it steals, it is because it feels neglected in one way or another. [...children] steal the love that isn't given to them." With respect to war Raknes meant for instance that it would be fine if the parents explained why people make wars against each other and to what this can lead, but they ought to leave it to the child to figure out what to make of it all. (Gabrielsen, 1962)

=== The child in each of us ===
Although Raknes mostly treated adult patients (Dannevig, 1975), it was the child that Ola Raknes focused on so strongly in his educational efforts to promote values and also as a therapist. The child is the center of focus in the article "Life and Religion", in the book Fri Vokster, in his therapy and in himself the way he was – the child in the adult and the child in itself, in center and teeming with life, the child which is devoid of sentimentality and childishness. His friend and student, Rolf Grønseth said of him that Ola Raknes manifested this child himself in his eagerness and his joy in searching and in pride in himself the way it can be seen in children, but that has been lost in most all adults – but that he combined this with an unusual degree of sober attitude. He saw things simply and straightforwardly and gave them names that all could understand. He could easily be misjudged as being naïve, but in reality he held a broad view. (Grønseth, 1975) Similarly was his repulsion great when it came to use of force and repression of others (Dannevig, 1975).

Ola Raknes once said to his friend and student Rolf Grønseth: "I too must be allowed to die at some time". He died pursuant to a brief bout of pneumonia at the end of January 1975, only a few days after his 88th birthday.

Einar Dannevig sums up his experience of Ola Raknes as a man of spirit: "The clarity of thought and emotion, conveyed through many languages, the ability to simplify with a taste for the big and significant parts of it all together with a genuine modesty and complete absence of ambitions for power made it a distinctive and a big experience to meet Ola Raknes, preferably in person, but also in writing." (Dannevig, 1975)

== Offices and associations ==
- Secretary of Det norske Samlaget 1922–29. "Heiderslagsmann" (honorary member) 1948
- Honorary member of Studentmållaget i Oslo from 1950
- Member of the board of Det norske teatret 1923–47,
- Member of the International Psychoanalytical Society 1929–38
- Member of Norsk Psykologforening from 1935
- Member of the International Institute for Sex Economy 1939
- American Association for medical orgonomy 1949
- The Wilhelm Reich Foundation 1950–56
- American College of Orgonomy from 1968
- Forum for karakteranalytisk vegetoterapi (Norwegian) from 1972

== Bibliography ==
- Fransk-norsk ordliste ("French – Norwegian Wordlist") (1914)
- Chapters in Norwegian Literature (in collaboration with I. C. Grøndahl – 1923)
- Engelsk-norsk ordbok ("English – Norwegian Dictionary") (1927)
- Møtet med det heilage ("Encounter with the Holy") (1927)
- Fransk-norsk ordbok ("French – Norwegian Dictionary") (1939–42) (new edition 1976)
- Fri Vokster (psychological essays – 1949)
- "Eit orgonomisk syn på helse og nokre terapeutiske, pedagogiske og sosiale fylgjer av det" – article in (supplement) "Psykisk sunnhet som psykologisk problem" of the journal Nordisk Psykologi 1953 (published in English as "The Orgonomic Concept of Health and its Social Consequences" in Wilhelm Reich and Orgonomy)
- Wilhelm Reich and Orgonomy (1970 – translated into a number of languages, though not Norwegian)

Raknes also wrote articles in amongst others the International Journal of Sex Economy and Orgone Research (under the pseudonym Carl Arnold), Orgone Energy Bulletin, Orgonomic Medicine and Syn og Segn.

Translations into Nynorsk:

- Colomba, Prosper Mérimée
- David Copperfield, Charles Dickens
- Religiøs røynsle i sine ymse former (1920), William James (original title The Varieties of Religious Experience)
- Låtten, Henri Bergson (original title Le Rire)

== Notes ==
A: At least it hadn't returned when he stated this in his 1950 autobiographical article.
B: What kind of a childhood experience is not told.
C: "Gesichtspunkte zur psychoanalytischen Religions-psychologie"
D: Published in Wilhelm Reich and Orgonomy

== Sources ==
All sources are in Norwegian

- Almenningen, Olaf et al.: Studentar i målstrid: Studentmållaget i Oslo 1900–2000 Oslo, Studentmållaget i Oslo, Det norske Samlaget (2003) ISBN 82-521-5698-3
- Faleide, Asbjørn; Grønseth, Rolf; Urdal, Bjørn (eds.): Dannevig, Einar Tellef: "Innleiing" In: Det levande i muskepanseret. Om kropp og sjel, muskelspenningar og psykoterapi, seksualitet og tilhøve mellom barn og vaksne Oslo – Bergen – Tromsø, Universitetsforlaget ISBN 82-00-02347-8
- Fyllingsnes, Ottar (1998) "Møttest i Mållaget" – Dag og Tid – Aslaug Vaa [supplement to Dag og Tid no. 22, 28 May 1998]
- Gabrielsen, Bjørn (13 January 1962) "Trollmannens lærling" – Arbeiderbladet
- Gatland, Jan Olav (2010). Ord og orgasme. Ein biografi om Ola Raknes [Words and orgasm. A biography of Ola Raknes]. Oslo, Norway: Det Norske Samlaget. ISBN 978-82-521-7561-5.
- Grønseth, Erik (2004) Raknes, Ola – NorgesLexi [online edition]. Accessed 29 July 2008
- Grønseth, Rolf (1975) "Ola Raknes til minne" – Tidsskrift for Norsk Psykologforening, vol. 12, no. 3
- Haga, Sverre Gunnar (10 October 2002). "Lager film om 'orgasmekongen'". Dagbladet (in Norwegian). Norway. Archived from the original on 5 June 2011.
- Kile, Svein M. (1989) "Ola Raknes, hjelpar og ven" – Fra Fjon til Fusa. Årbok for Hordamuseet og for Nord- og Midhordaland Sogelag. Vol. 42, pages 58–60
- Nilsen, Håvard: "Ola Raknes" In: Norsk biografisk leksikon 2nd ed. vol. 7. Oslo, Kunnskapsforlaget (2003) ISBN 82-573-1009-3
- Raknes, Ola (1959) "Ola Raknes" – Norsk pedagogisk tidsskrift. Vol. 43, pages 272–279 [autobiographical article which for the most part was based on a letter which Raknes wrote to Wilhelm Reich in 1950 and which was printed in Orgone Energy Bulletin volume 4 (4), 1952). The article is also printed in Åse Gruda Skard (ed.) Psykologi og psykologar i Norge (Universitetsforlaget, Oslo, 1959)
- Raknes, Ola (2003) "Reichs orgonterapi" – Tidsskrift for Den norske Lægeforening. Vol. 123, number 1634 [From the debate column in the 69th volume (1939)]
- Skard, Sigmund (1975) "Ola Raknes" – Syn og Segn. Vol. 81, number 5, pages 268–274 [possibly identical to Skard's eulogy at the funeral of Raknes on 4 February 1975 in the chapel of Vestre Gravlund cemetery]
- Stai, Arne "Oppgjøret omkring psykoanalysen og Wilhelm Reich! In: Norsk kultur- og moraldebatt i 1930–årene. 2nd ed. Oslo, Gyldendal (1954) ISBN 82-05-11107-3 [1978 edition in the "Fakkel" series]
- Steenstrup, Bjørn (ed.): "Raknes, Ola" In: Hvem er Hvem? 11th ed., page 450. Oslo, Aschehoug (1973) ISBN 82-03-04887-0
