= Harald Stanghelle =

Norwegian newspaper editor (born 1956)

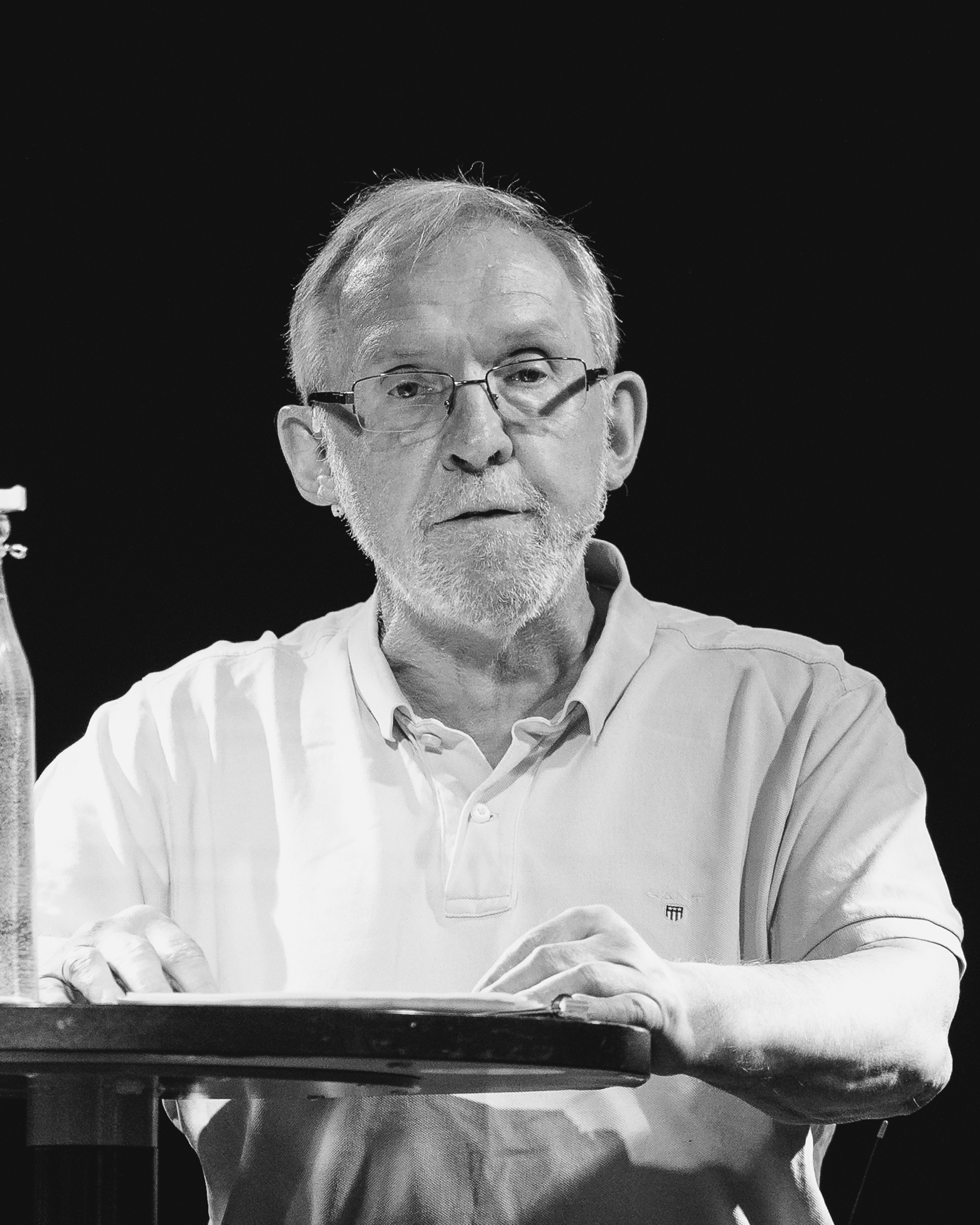
Stanghelle in 2026

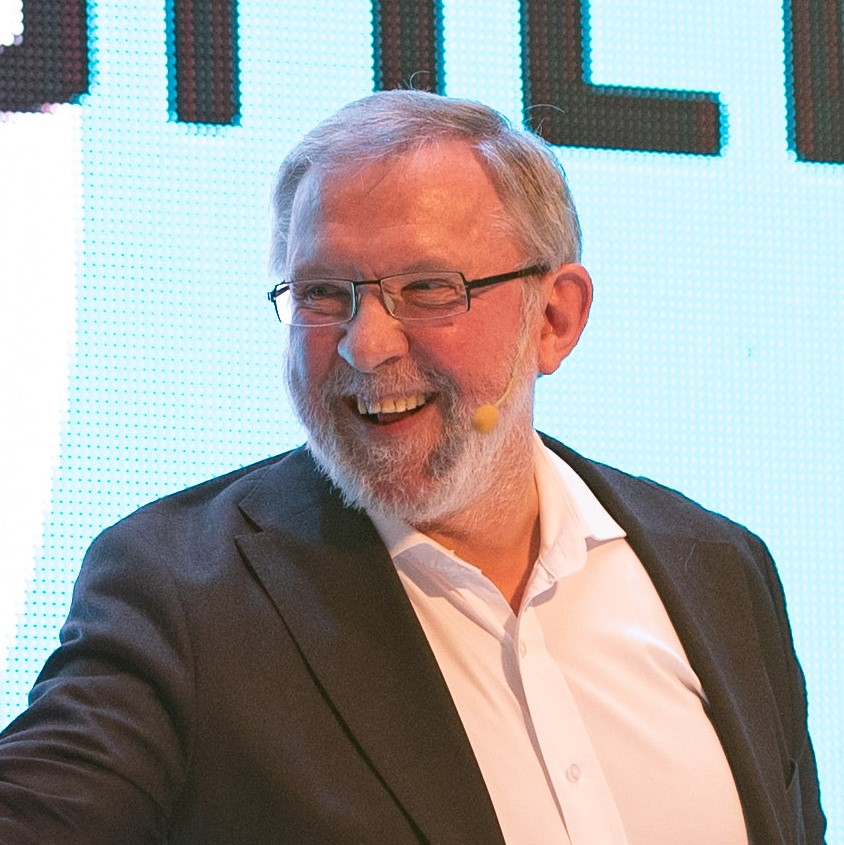
Harald Stanghelle, 2018

Harald Stanghelle (born 13 January 1956) is a Norwegian newspaper editor.

== Career ==
He was born in Bruvik Municipality (now part of Vaksdal Municipality). He started his career as a journalist when still a teenager, and left school after primary school. His first role was that of editor of Vaksdalsnytt at the age of 19. He was then a journalist in Arbeiderbladet from 1982 to 1991, and in Aftenposten from 1991. Here he spent one year as news editor, from 1994 to 1995, before being editor-in-chief for the national newspaper Dagbladet from 1995 to 2000. In 2000 he became political editor of Aftenposten. In 2009 he was elected as chair of the Association of Norwegian Editors, succeeding Stein Gauslaa.

He was also the former Vice-President of the World Editors Forum until February 2011 and is since April 2011 a board member of the Global Editors Network.

Media offices
Preceded by Bjørn Simensen	Chief editor of Dagbladet; 1995–2000	Succeeded by John Olav Egeland
