= John G. Bernander =

Norwegian politician (born 1957)

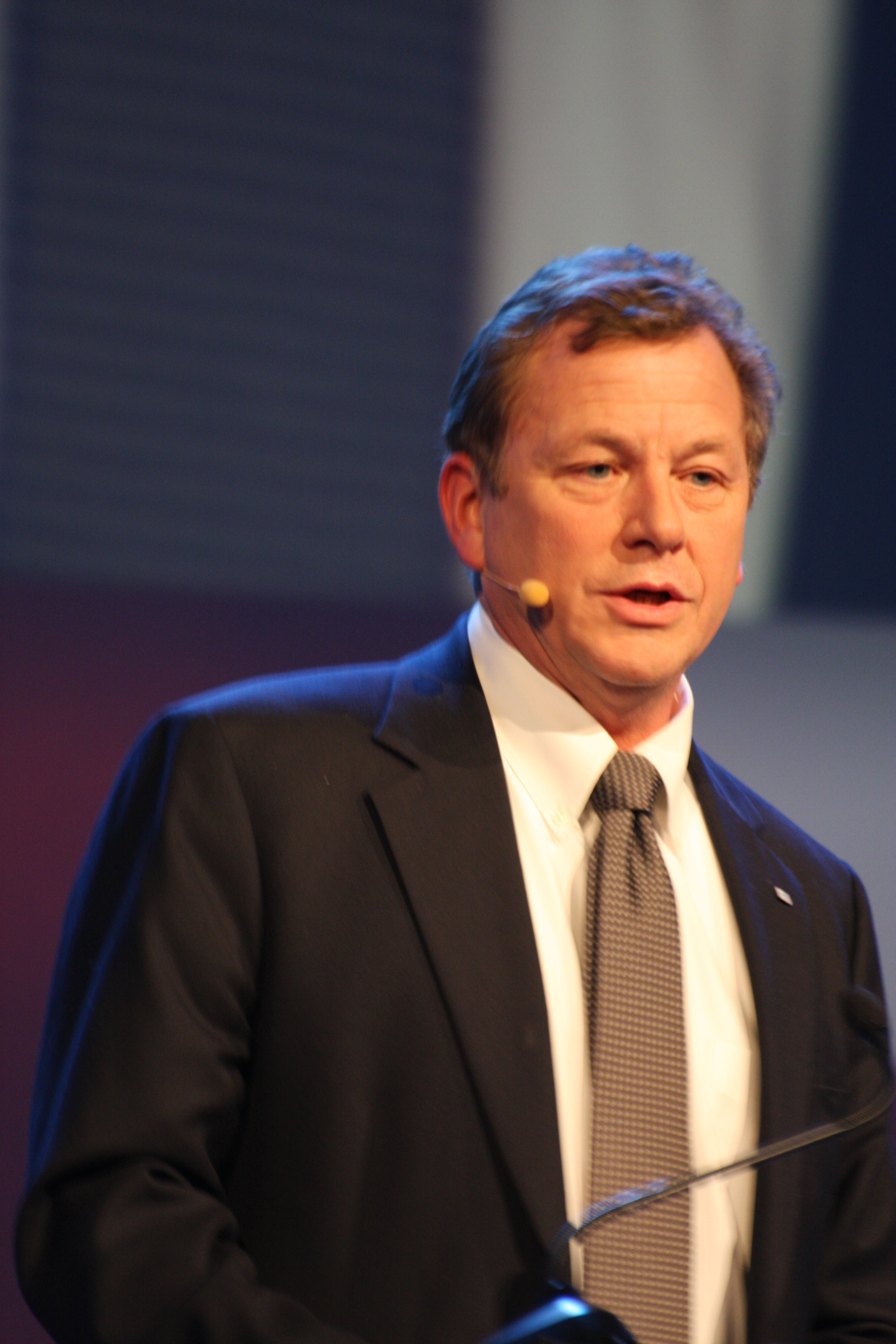

Director-General of the Confederation of Norwegian Enterprise
- In office 21 September 2009 – 1 November 2012
- Preceded by: Finn Bergesen Jr.
- Succeeded by: Kristin Skogen Lund

Director-General of the Norwegian Broadcasting Cooperation
- In office 15 June 2001 – 19 March 2007
- Preceded by: Einar Førde
- Succeeded by: Hans-Tore Bjerkaas

Deputy Leader of the Conservative Party
- In office 20 April 1991 – 10 April 1994
- Leader: Kaci Kullmann Five
- Preceded by: Astrid Nøklebye Heiberg (First Deputy)
- Succeeded by: Børge Brende (First Deputy)

Member of the Norwegian Parliament
- In office 1 October 1989 – 30 September 1993
- Constituency: Vest-Agder

Personal details
- Born: John Gordon Bernander; 22 September 1957 (age 68) New York City, New York, U. S
- Party: Conservative
- Spouse: Sigrun Bernander
- Children: Mathias Bernander

John Gordon Bernander (born 22 September 1957) is a Norwegian politician for the Conservative Party and former director-general of the Norwegian Broadcasting Corporation (NRK) and the Confederation of Norwegian Enterprise.

== Early life and career ==
He was born in New York City and grew up in Brooklyn and Kristiansand. He was educated at the Norwegian Naval Academy in Bergen from 1976 to 1977 and graduated from the University of Oslo with the cand.jur. degree in 1982. After being a junior solicitor in Kristiansand, he was a corporate lawyer in Sørlandsbanken from 1986 to 1988 and in Johan G. Olsen Industrier from 1988 to 1989.

== Politics ==
He was a member of Kristiansand city council from 1979 to 1985 and 1987 to 1989, serving the first period in the executive committee. Having chaired Kristiansand Young Conservatives from 1974 to 1975, he chaired the Vest-Agder Conservative Party chapter from 1988 to 1989. He got his first national appointment when serving as a personal secretary (today known as political advisor) in the Ministry of Industry from 1985 to 1986.

In 1989 he was elected to the Parliament of Norway from Vest-Agder, but he did not stand for re-election in 1993. From March to November 1990 he was appointed State Secretary in the Ministry of Trade. During this period his seat in Parliament was filled by Kirsten Huser Leschbrandt.

Bernander was a member of the Conservative Party central board from 1988 to 1997, and from 1991 to 1994 Bernander was vice-chairman of the Conservative Party. He declined to stand for leadership when leader Kaci Kullmann Five resigned in 1994. His last major position within the Conservative Party was to lead the electoral committee in 1999. In 1996 he briefly sat on the Norwegian Parliamentary Intelligence Oversight Committee.

== Media ==
From 15 June 2001 to 19 March 2007, Bernander was the director-general of the Norwegian Broadcasting Corporation (NRK), the Norwegian state-owned broadcasting company. He succeeded Einar Førde, and was succeeded by Hans-Tore Bjerkaas. From 2006 to 2007 Bernander was vice president of the European Broadcasting Union, and in addition he was a board member of the Association of Norwegian Editors and the Norwegian Press Association from 2003 to 2007. His time at NRK was marked by the expansion of digital distribution. NRK also launched NRK Super toward the end of his tenure.

== Business ==
From 1993 Bernander was the vice chief executive of Assuranceforeningen Gard in Arendal, continuing as chief executive officer from 1995 to 2001.

From May 2007 Bernander is associated with The Mosvold Shipping Group in Kristiansand. From September 2009 to September 2012 he was the director-general of the Confederation of Norwegian Enterprise. He then moved on to the managing director position in Viking Heat Engines.

Bernander was a board member of several companies including Det Norske Veritas (1996–2002), and sat on the supervisory council of the Bank of Norway. He was also chairman of Christianssands Bryggeri from 1993 to 1999, when the brewery company was bought by Hansa Borg. He has later been chair of Talent Norge from 2015 to 2020 and board member of Amedia from 2016.

Preceded by Einar Førde	Director-general of the Norwegian Broadcasting Corporation; 2001–2007	Succeeded by Hans-Tore Bjerkaas
Preceded by Finn Bergesen	Director-general of the Confederation of Norwegian Enterprise; 2009–2012	Succeeded by Kristin Skogen Lund
