= Vibeke Fürst Haugen =

Norwegian media executive

Director-General of the Norwegian Broadcasting Corporation
- Incumbent
- Assumed office 2022
- Preceded by: Thor Gjermund Eriksen

Personal details
- Born: 20 May 1968 (age 57) Oslo, Norway
- Occupation: Media executive

Vibeke Fürst Haugen (born 20 May 1968) is a Norwegian media executive. From 2022 she serves as Director-General of the Norwegian Broadcasting Corporation.

== Career ==
Born in Oslo on 20 May 1968, Fürst Haugen graduated as cand.mag. from the University of Oslo in 1994, and has later had further education from the Norwegian School of Economics and Harvard University.

Working for the broadcasting company NRK from 1994, she eventually assumed various administrative positions. She was appointed Director-General of the Norwegian Broadcasting Corporation in 2022, succeeding Thor Gjermund Eriksen.

From 2023 she was a board member of the Association of Norwegian Editors.

Media offices
Preceded by Thor Gjermund Eriksen	Director-General of the NRK; 2022–-	Succeeded by incumbent
