= Håndslag =

Håndslag was a Norwegian bi-weekly political magazine issued in Stockholm from June 1942 to June 1945. It was issued by Eyvind Johnson, and edited by Torolf Elster. Among the journalists were Willy Brandt and Helge Krog. The magazine was secretly distributed in occupied Norway. Towards the end of the war it had a circulation of 15,000–20,000 copies.
