= Mathias Bernander =

Norwegian politician (born 1989)

Mayor of Kristiansand
- Incumbent
- Assumed office 11 October 2023
- Preceded by: Jan Oddvar Skisland

Personal details
- Born: 6 February 1989 (age 37)
- Party: Conservative Party
- Parent: John G. Bernander (father)

Mathias Bernander (born 6 February 1989) is a Norwegian politician serving as mayor of Kristiansand since 2023. From 2017 to 2021, he was a deputy member of the Storting. He is the son of John G. Bernander.
