= Ekeland =

Ekeland is a surname. Notable people with the surname include:

- Arne Ekeland (1908–1994), Norwegian painter
- Ivar Ekeland (born 1944), French mathematician of Norwegian descent
- Jostein Ekeland (born 1997), Norwegian footballer
- Tor Ekeland (born 1969), American lawyer

== See also ==
- Ekelund
