= Bjørn Simensen =

Norwegian theatre director (1947–2025)

Bjørn Erik Simensen (28 June 1947 – 28 March 2025) was a Norwegian culture administrator and journalist who was known as director of the Norwegian National Opera from 1984 to 1990 and 1997 to 2009.

== Life and career ==
Simensen was born in Lillehammer on 28 June 1947. Starting his career as a journalist, he worked in Fredriksstad Blad and then in Sunnmørsposten from 1966 to 1972.

He then worked as a culture administrator. First, 1973 to 1980, he worked in Sandefjord municipality. He then became director of Gothenburg Concert Hall from 1980 to 1984, then of the Gothenburg Symphony before his first period as director of the Norwegian National Opera, from 1984 to 1990.

Simensen was editor-in-chief for the national newspaper Dagbladet from 1990 to 1995 before returning to the National Opera. He oversaw the construction of the Oslo Opera House, which was opened in 2008. He stepped down in 2009.

On 3 December 2007, Simensen was appointed Commander of the Royal Norwegian Order of St. Olav.

Simensen died on 28 March 2025, at the age of 77.

Media offices
Preceded by Arve Solstad	Chief editor of Dagbladet; 1990–1995	Succeeded by Harald Stanghelle
