= Thor Gjermund Eriksen =

Norwegian journalist and editor

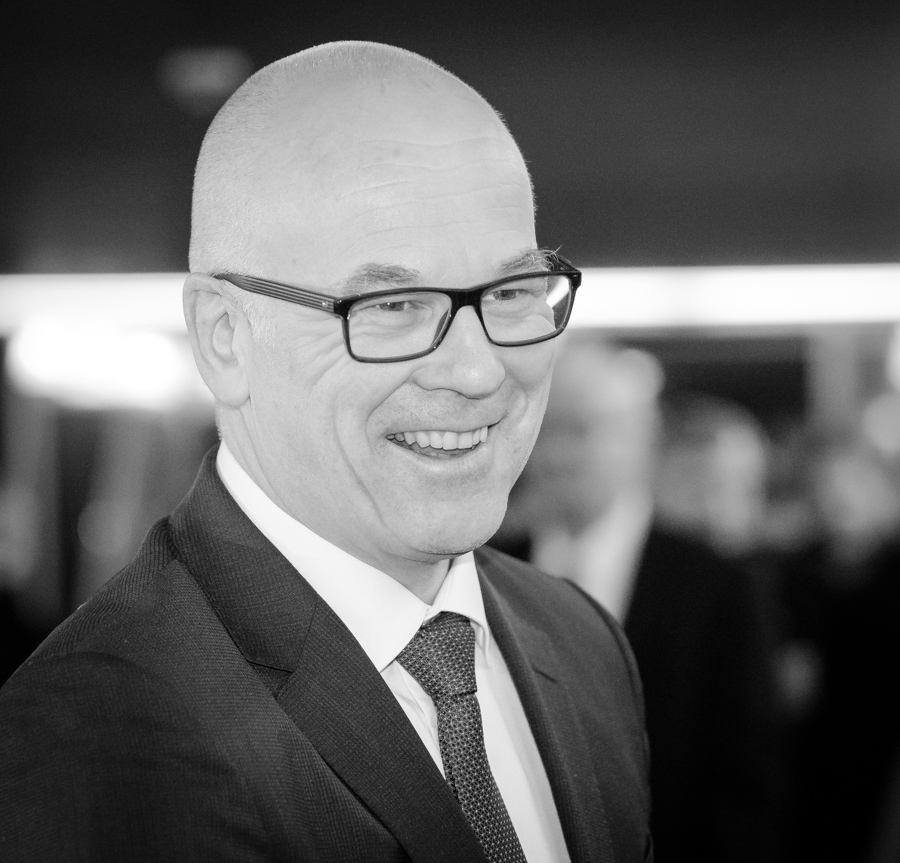
- Eriksen in 2018

Director-General of the Norwegian Broadcasting Corporation
- In office 12 March 2013 – 29 April 2022
- Preceded by: Hans-Tore Bjerkaas
- Succeeded by: Vibeke Fürst Haugen

Chief Editor of Dagbladet
- In office 2003–2006
- Preceded by: John Olav Egeland
- Succeeded by: Lars Helle (acting)

Personal details
- Born: 2 October 1966 (age 60) Oslo, Norway
- Party: Labour (formerly)

Thor Gjermund Eriksen (born 2 October 1966) is a Norwegian journalist and editor who was director-general of the Norwegian Broadcasting Corporation from 2013 to 2022.

== Career ==
=== Journalistic career ===
Born in Oslo, he was hired as a journalist in Dagbladet in 1995, and later became chief editor from 2003 to 2006. After leaving, he was hired in A-pressen where he was CEO from 2010 until January 2013. He is also chairman of the board of Nettavisen and was a board member in TV 2 until December 2012.

=== Political career ===
He has had a political career in the Socialist Left Party and the Labour Party. He was a member of the central board of their youth wing Socialist Youth, worked as a personal advisor for then-party leader Erik Solheim and worked as secretary for Raymond Johansen when the latter was Oslo city commissioner for transport and the environment. He terminated his membership in the Labour Party when he was appointed director-General of NRK.

=== Director-General of the NRK ===
He was appointed Director-General of the Norwegian Broadcasting Corporation on 11 December 2012 and started in the position on 12 March 2013.

On 11 October 2021, Eriksen announced that he was intending to step down as director-general over the course of 2022. He stated that it was time for a change. His successor, Vibeke Fürst Haugen, was nominated on 17 March 2022 and became the first woman to hold the position.

Media offices
Preceded by John Olav Egeland	Chief editor of Dagbladet; 2003–2006	Succeeded by Lars Helle (acting)
Preceded by Hans-Tore Bjerkaas	Director-General of the NRK; 2013–2022	Succeeded by Vibeke Fürst Haugen
