= Kontakt (magazine) =

Norwegian political magazine (1947–1954)

- Editor: Torolf Elster
- Categories: Political magazine
- Frequency: Monthly
- Founder: Labor Party
- Founded: 1947
- First issue: March 1947
- Final issue: 1954
- Country: Norway
- Based in: Oslo
- Language: Norwegian

Kontakt (Norwegian: Contact) was a Norwegian monthly political magazine which existed between 1947 and 1954 in Oslo, Norway. The magazine was launched by the Labor Party and is known for its editor Torolf Elster who was a Norwegian journalist and author.

== History and profile ==
Kontakt was established by the Labor Party in 1947. Its first issue appeared in March that year. Torolf Elster was the founding editor-in-chief and remained in the post until 1954 when the magazine folded. It was headquartered in Oslo and published on a monthly basis.

Elster declared that two concepts were the key terms for Kontakt, democracy and the world. The magazine was financed by the Labor Party, but published neutral articles. However, it frequently featured articles which attempted to clarify the ideological basis of the party. In each issue the magazine covered eight-page analysis of foreign policy news. Kontakt did not endorse the Soviet-backed coup d'état in Czechoslovakia in 1948 and began to support NATO from 1949.
