= Egil Sundt =

Norwegian civil servant

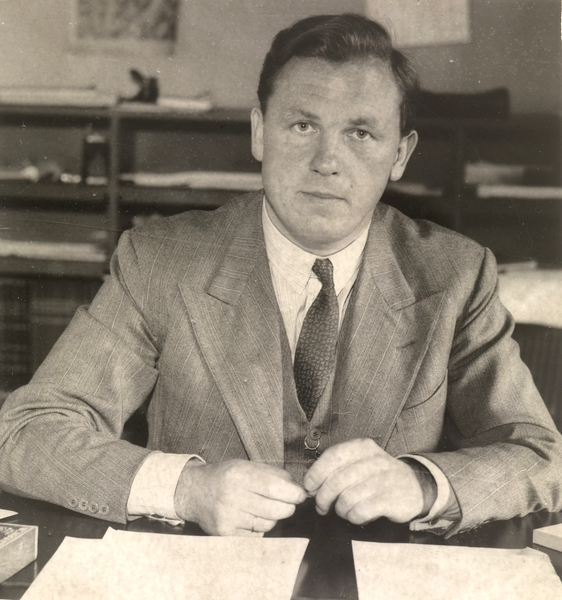
- Born: 23 September 1903; Kristiania, Norway
- Died: 6 September 1950 (aged 46); Oslo
- Occupation: Civil servant
- Known for: Director-General of the Norwegian Broadcasting Corporation; Director-General of the Norwegian State Railways

Egil Sundt (23 September 1903 – 6 September 1950) was a Norwegian lawyer and government official who served as director of several national agencies.

Egil Kaare Sundt was born in Kristiania (Now Oslo), Norway. He was the son of Othar Sundt and Sigrid Holm. In 1929 he married Dagny Dick Thorkildsen. He graduated from the Oslo Cathedral School from 1922. He earned his law degree in 1925.

In 1929, Sundt began working with the National Ministry of Finance. In 1933, he became Chief Financial Office of the bureau. Sundt served as Director-General of the Norwegian Broadcasting Corporation from 1939 to 1940. During the Nazi occupation of Norway, Sundt was director of the financial services and insurance company Norske Alliance (now Storebrand). From 1945 to 1946, he was Councillor of State in the Norwegian Ministry of Finance. He served as Director-General of the Norwegian State Railways from 1946 until his death in 1950.
