= Kirsten Huser Leschbrandt =

Norwegian politician (born 1945)

Kirsten Huser Leschbrandt (born 31 December 1945) is a Norwegian politician for the Conservative Party. She served in a variety of positions from 1979.

She was born in Oslo, daughter of Sverre Oskar Huser and Gladys Hansen. She took various paths of education, completing courses in secretarial work, then anatomy, histology and physiology, then chemistry and physics, then a minor degree in pedagogy, then EDB, then marketing (1977). From 1969 she worked in Mandal.

She was a member of Mandal municipal council from 1979, serving as deputy mayor from 1983 to 1991 and mayor from 1991 to 2003. She tried to win re-election in 2003 as well, but failed. Instead she became a regular council member again. She served as a deputy representative to the Parliament of Norway from Vest-Agder during the terms 1989–1993 and 1997–2001; from August to November 1990 she met as a regular representative, covering for John G. Bernander who was a State Secretary in Syse's Cabinet. In total she met during 199 days of parliamentary session.

She chaired Vest-Agder's county chapter of the Conservative Party from 1998 to 2003, and was a member of the central party committee during the same period. She was a board member of the local branches of the Norwegian Labour Inspection Authority from 1985 to 1990 and the Norwegian Association of Local and Regional Authorities from 1987 to 1999. From 1998 to 2000 she sat on the committee that delivered Norwegian Official Report 2000: 22. She was a board member of the Southern Norway Regional Health Authority from 2006 to 2007, and from 2007 in the Southern and Eastern Norway Regional Health Authority.

In 2005 it became known that she had survived breast cancer. She discovered it in May 2004, but the treatment was successful. Having lost her job as mayor, she started her own consultant company KHL Rådgivning and underwent training in business coaching.
