= Aslaug Vaa =

Norwegian poet and playwright

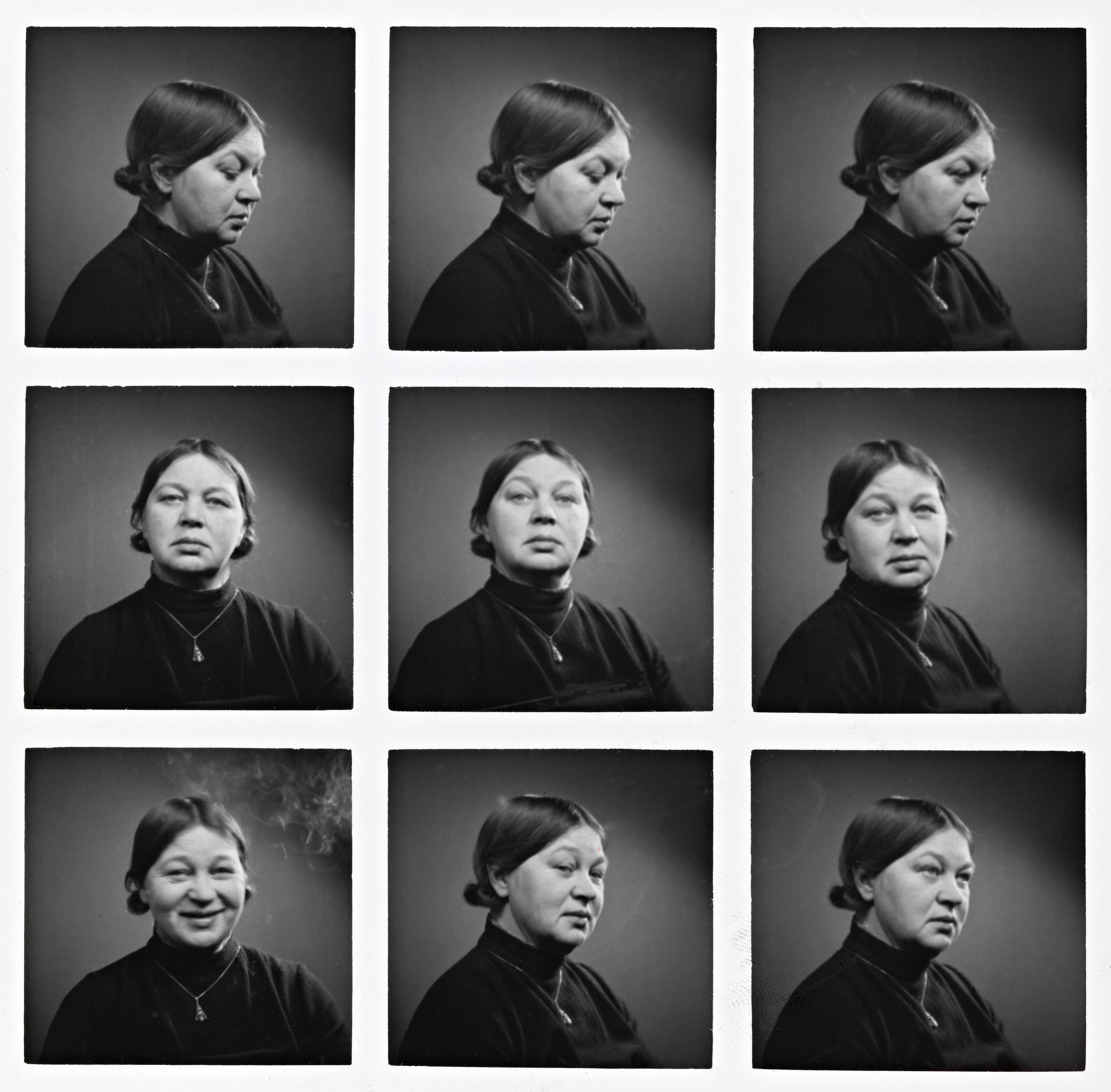
- Portraits of Vaa
- Born: 25 August 1889; Rauland Municipality, Norway
- Died: 28 November 1965 (aged 76)
- Occupations: Poet and playwright
- Spouse: Ola Raknes (m. 1911–1938)
- Children: Magli Elster
- Relatives: Dyre Vaa (brother); Torolf Elster (son-in-law); Jon Elster (grandson)
- Writing career
- Notable awards: Melsom Prize, 1935

Aslaug Vaa (25 August 1889 – 28 November 1965) was a Norwegian poet and playwright. Her works contain elements from local tradition and landscape mixed with international influence.

== Personal life ==
Aslaug Vaa was born on Nystog in Rauland Municipality in Telemark county, Norway. She was the daughter of farmers Tor Aanundsson Vaa and Anne Marie Roholt, and was a sister of sculptor Dyre Vaa. She was married to Norwegian psychologist and writer Ola Raknes, and she was the mother of Magli Elster.

== Literary career ==
Vaa graduated with examen artium from Aars og Voss skole in Kristiania in 1909, and with "anneneksamen" from the Royal Frederick University in 1911. After her first studies, she produced works as journalist and translator, including for the magazine Den 17de Mai. While spending longer periods abroad together with her husband, she studied arts at Sorbonne in Paris, and experimental theatre in Berlin.

Vaa made her literary debut in 1934 with the poetry collection Nord i leite, and she followed up with the collections Skuggen og strendan (1935), Villarkonn (1936), and På vegakanten (1939).

Her poem So rodde dei fjordan ("then they rowed the fjords") was frequently recited on radio, has been selected for several anthologies, and was made into a song with melody by Geirr Tveitt. Vaa's poetry and writing contains elements from local tradition, landscape and language, but also international influence.

Her first play, Steinguden (1938) is treating marriage-related issues. Her second play, Tjugendagen (1947) is set in a rural society around 1850. Honningfuglen og leoparden (first staged in 1955) is inspired from African legends.

Vaa contributed articles to several newspapers and magazines, including Arbeiderbladet, Verdens Gang and Dagbladet.

== Selected bibliography ==
=== Plays ===
- 1938 Steinguden
- 1947 Tjugendagen
- 1965 Honningfuglen og leoparden
- 1966 Munkeklokka

=== Poetry ===
- 1934 Nord i leite
- 1935 Skuggen og strendan
- 1936 Villarkonn
- 1939 På vegakanten
- 1947 Fotefár
- 1954 Skjenkarsveinens visurry
- 1963 Bustader

== Other sources ==
- Mæhle, Leif (2001) Fann eg dei stigar…» Vandringar i Aslaug Vaas dikting (Oslo: Aschehoug) ISBN 82-03-18440-5
