= Finn Bergesen =

Norwegian civil servant and businessperson (1945-2012)

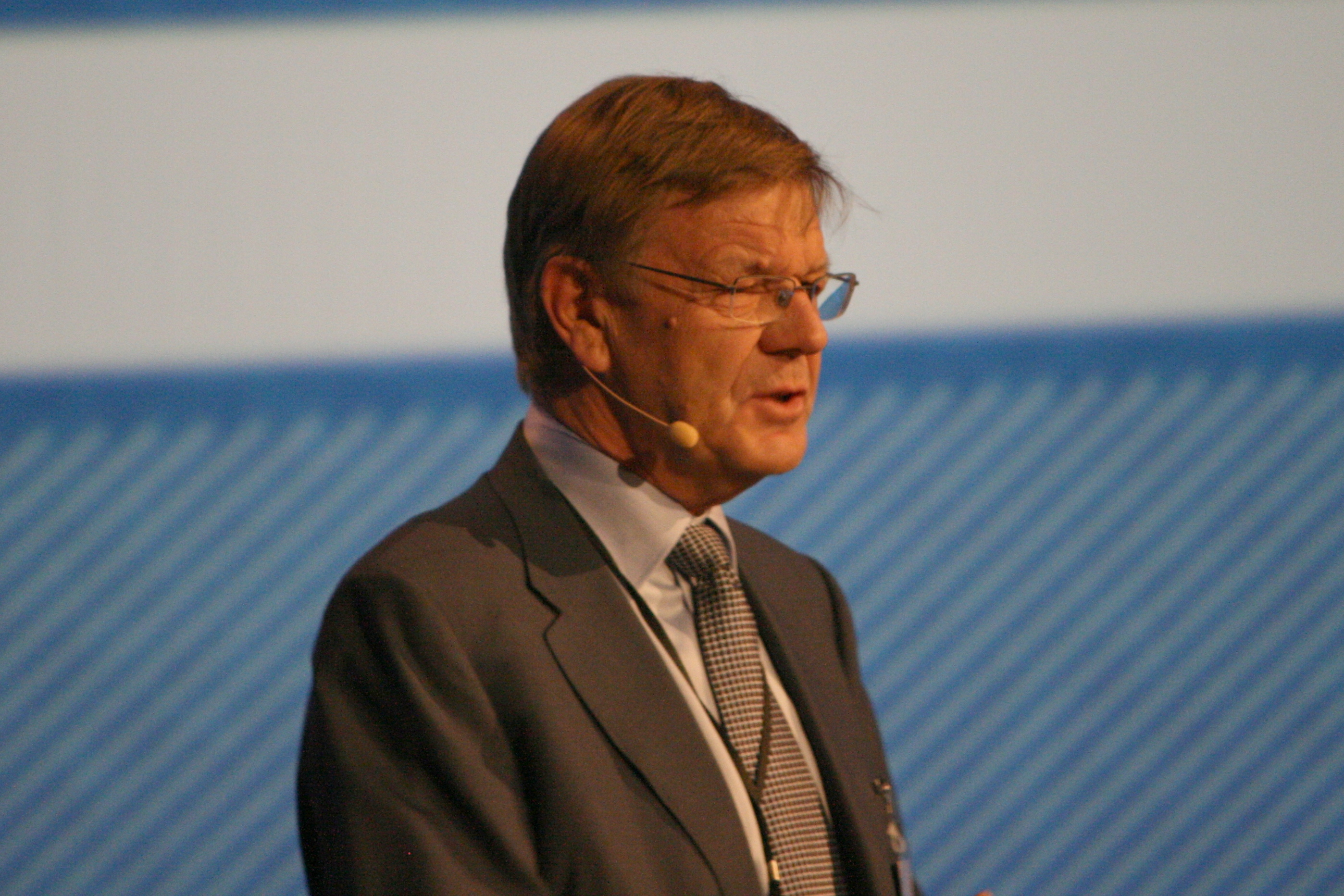
- Finn Bergesen (2009)
- Born: 3 September 1945
- Died: 11 September 2012 (aged 67)
- Occupation: businessperson

Finn Bergesen (3 September 1945 – 11 September 2012) was a Norwegian civil servant and businessperson.

He worked in the Ministry of Fisheries and the Ministry of Foreign Affairs between 1973 and 1983, and then became secretary-general of Norges Fiskarlag. He remained so until 1989, and was then chief executive in Norges Sildesalgslag from 1990 to 1995. From 1995 to 1998 he was the chief executive officer of Kavli Holding, and from 1999 to 2009 he was the director-general of the Confederation of Norwegian Enterprise.

Business positions
Preceded by Karl Glad	Director-general of the Confederation of Norwegian Enterprise; 1999–2009	Succeeded by John G. Bernander
