= Hans-Tore Bjerkaas =

Norwegian broadcasting director (born 1951)

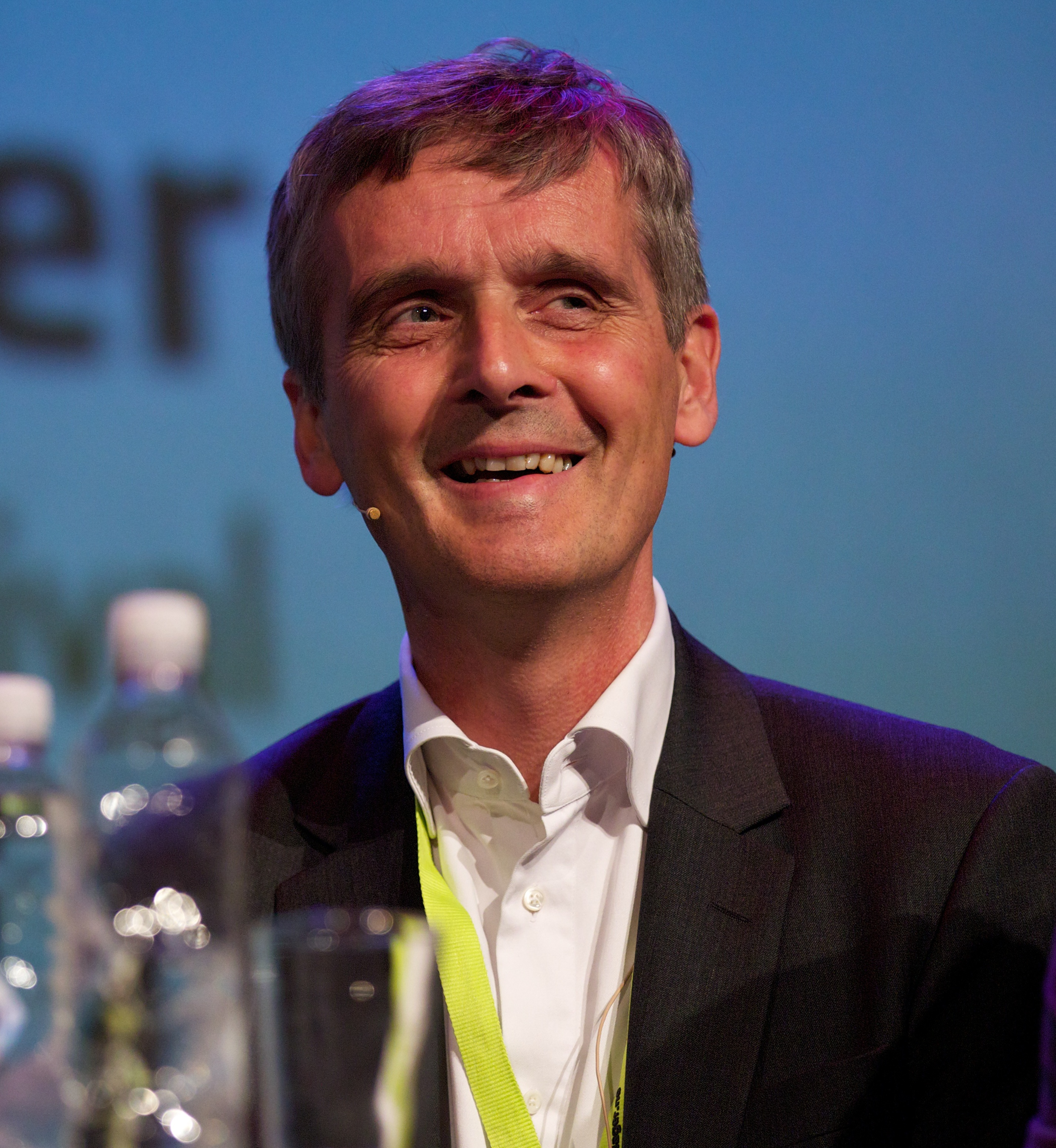
Bjerkaas in 2010

Hans-Tore Bjerkaas (born 7 June 1951 in Tromsø) is a former Director-General of the Norwegian Broadcasting Corporation (NRK).

He began his broadcasting career in 1977, joining NRK's Troms region, where he was deputy editor. Later, he was appointed deputy editor of NRK's Hordaland region. In 1992, he became director of programmes at the private TV 2, but returned to the NRK as the editor of regional programmes in Troms. Later, he became the Head of NRK Television, before returning as the chief editor of NRK Troms and Finnmark.

He was appointed Director-General by the NRK board on 24 January 2007, succeeding John G. Bernander. He retired from this position on 11 March 2013 and was succeeded by Thor Gjermund Eriksen.

In his younger days, Bjerkaas was a footballer, captaining Tromsø IL between 1970 and 1980. He played as a midfielder.

Preceded by John G. Bernander	Director-General of the NRK; 2007–2013	Succeeded by Thor Gjermund Eriksen
