= Ankerbrua =

Bridge in Oslo, Norway

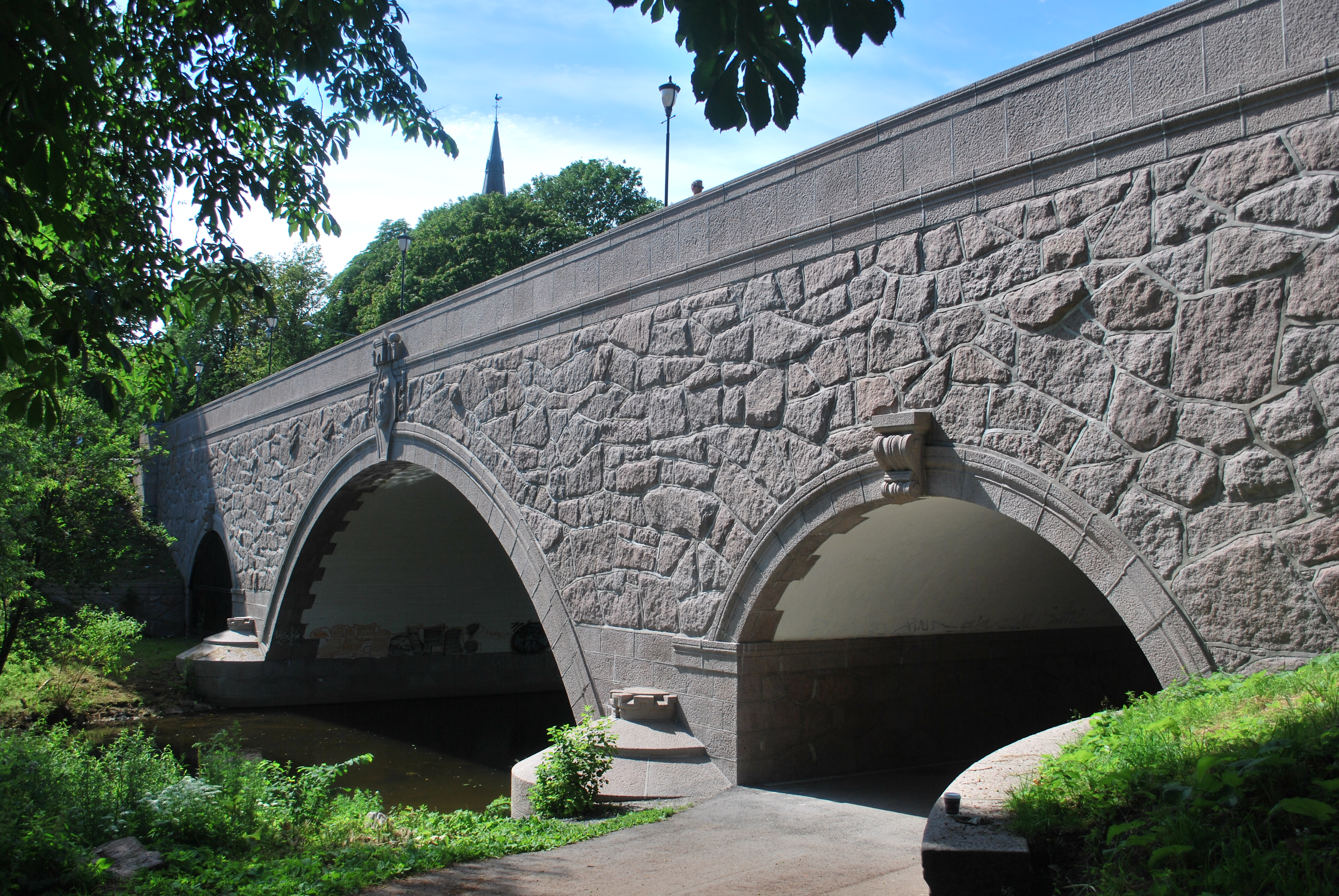
East side of Ankerbrua over the Akker river.

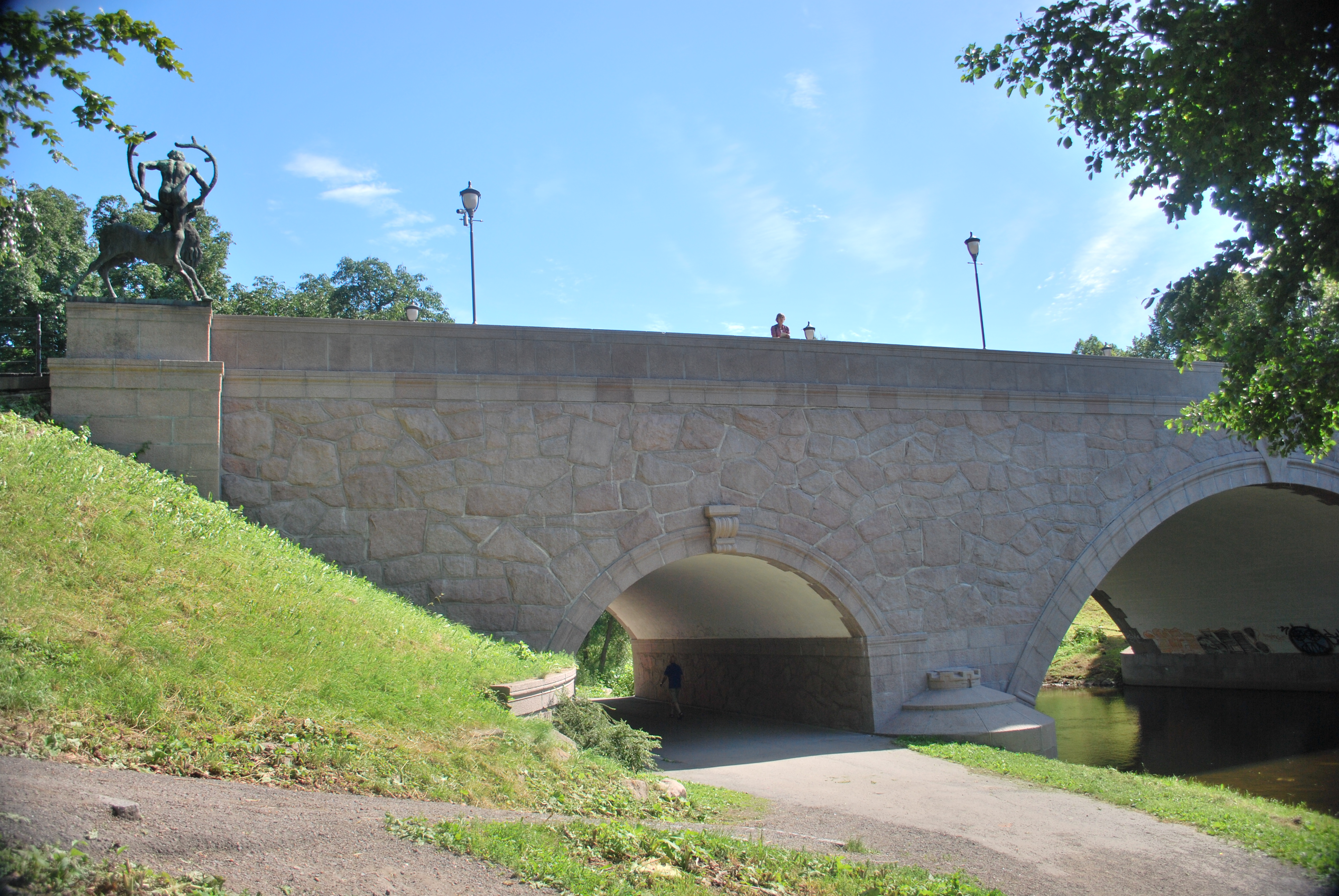
West side of Ankerbrua over the Akker river.

Ankerbrua is a bridge located in the district of Grünerløkka in Oslo, Norway.

== History ==
Ankerbrua was built over the Aker River (Akerselva) to serve as an extension of Torggata along Ankertorget with Søndre gate. The former wooden bridge was constructed in 1874. After several landslides on muddy terrain, it was demolished. It was replaced by the current structure in 1926, being made of Drammen granite from Røyken. The walls of the bridge have an irregular pattern and rough surface in the Art Nouveau style.

During plans to renovate the Grünerløkka borough in the 1960s, Ankerbrua was one of the few structures selected to be preserved.

The bridge has been nicknamed the Fairytale Bridge (Eventyrbrua) due to its four sculptures, one in each corner. These sculptures were designed by Norwegian sculptor and artist, Dyre Vaa. Cast from bronze in 1937, each figure represents a different Norwegian folk hero from Norwegian Folktales.

The motifs are:

- White-Bear-King-Valemon (Kvitebjørn kong Valemon) - a king who was cursed to spend his days as a polar bear after he refused to marry a wicked witch.
- Per Gynt - a legendary deer hunter from Gudbrandsdalen.
- Katie Woodencloak (Kari Trestakk) - who escaped her evil stepmother on the back of a great blue ox.
- Veslefrikk med fela - a young man who gets three wishes from a troll.
