= Erik Egeland =

Norwegian journalist and art critic

Erik Egeland (21 July 1921 – 19 March 1996) was a Norwegian journalist and art critic.

== Life ==
He was born in Bekkelaget as a son of John Oscar Egeland (1891–1985) and Eva Puntervold Winther (1896–1969). The family soon moved to Frogner. He was the father of journalist and editor John Olav Egeland. He lived at Løkenlia in Bærum in his later life.

He graduated from secondary school at Oslo Commerce School in 1941. Socially he was a part of a group of socialist school students, but would later change adherence to Moral Re-Armament. He took his examen artium in 1945, and also had unfinished studies at the Norwegian National Academy of Craft and Art Industry. He also studied briefly at the University of Oslo, Fresno College and Académie Julian. His media career started as subeditor of Ungdom in 1945, and in 1948 he was hired in the London correspondent's office of Morgenbladet. After his studies at the Académie Julian he worked in the magazine NÅ before returning to Morgenbladet. He was cultural editor of Morgenbladet from 1960 to 1970, then a culture journalist, art critic and commentator in Aftenposten from 1970 to 1988.

He chaired Oslo Kunstforening from 1955 to 1958 and a local Riksmål association from 1965 to 1967. He wrote books about many artists: Kai Fjell (1977), reissued 1990), Jakob Weidemann (1978, 1986), Ernst Neizvestny (1984, translated to Swedish and English) and Øistein Thurman (1989). He wrote histories on the companies Christiania Dampkjøkken in 1957 and De norske gjær- & spritfabrikker in 1968. The memoirs Tidsinnstilt. Fra liv og presse (which he also illustrated) were issued in 1987, and the personal story Blå skygge came in 1996 shortly before his death from cancer.
