= Director-General of the Norwegian Broadcasting Corporation =

The Director-General is chief executive and editor-in-chief of the Norwegian Broadcasting Corporation (NRK). The position is appointed by the NRK board, which in turn is appointed by the government.

The title of the Director-General in Norwegian is (since 1948) kringkastingssjef, which literally means "chief of broadcasting".

- Olav Midttun (1934–1940 and 1945–1947), he held the title of riksprogramsjef, "national chief of programmes"
- Thorstein Diesen, Jr. (1947–1948) (acting riksprogramsjef)
- Egil Sundt (1939–1940 and 1945–1946), he held the title of administerende direktør
- Knut Tvedt (acting) (1946–1948), he held the title of administerende direktør
- Kaare Fostervoll (1948–1962)
- Hans Jacob Ustvedt (1962–1972)
- Torolf Elster (1972–1981)
- Bjartmar Gjerde (1981–1989)
- Olav Nilssen (acting) (1989)
- Einar Førde (1989–2001)
- John G. Bernander (2001–2007)
- Hans Tore Bjerkaas (2007–2013)
- Thor Gjermund Eriksen (2013–2022)
- Vibeke Fürst Haugen (2022–)
