= Nansen Academy =

- Nansenskolen – Norsk Humanistisk Akademi (Norwegian)
- Logo of Nansenskolen

Location
- Bjørnstjerne Bjørnsonsgate 2 Lillehammer, Norway; 2609
- Coordinates: 61°6′28″N 10°27′55″E

Information
- Founded: 1938
- Status: Folk High School
- Head teacher: Unn Irene Aasdalen
- Age: 19 to 82
- Website: www.nansenskolen.no

The Nansen Academy – Norwegian Humanistic Academy (Norwegian: Nansenskolen – Norsk Humanistisk Akademi) is a folk high school in Lillehammer, Norway.

== History ==
Nansen Academy was founded as a humanist and anti-totalitarian institution. The school was named after polar explorer, scientist, author and humanist Fridtjof Nansen (1861-1930). His work embodied essential elements of humanism: active love of one's neighbour and freedom of thought.

The school was established in 1938 by Kristian Vilhelm Koren Schjelderup Jr. (1894–1980) Bishop of the Diocese of Hamar together with future Norwegian Resistance Movement members Anders Platou Wyller (1903-1940) and Henriette Bie Lorentzen (1911–2001). Its first school year started in 1939. It was closed and dissolved during the occupation of Norway by Nazi Germany, after only one year of existence. It resurfaced after the liberation of Norway at the end of World War II and re-opened in 1946.

The Nansen Academy offers a one-year study founded in the Folk high school tradition common to Scandinavian nations. The interdisciplinary programme is mainly based on social and humanistic sciences. Historical, holistic and ethical perspectives are encouraged. The main aim is to inspire independent thinking and reflection, as well as creativity, as a basis for active participation in society. All students attend classes in philosophy, international security politics and cultural history (art, literature, music) as well as their chosen programme. The students stay in dormitories on campus.

The Nansen Academy initiated the Norwegian Festival of Literature (Norsk Litteraturfestival) and the first national dialogues between religions in Norway. It organizes the yearly Olympic academies in cooperation with the Norwegian Olympic and Paralympic Committee and Confederation of sports. The Nansen Academy also organises a center working on dialogue in war zones and for peace education, Nansen Center for Peace and Dialogue. The academy received the Fritt Ord Award (Fritt Ords pris) in 1987 and received Honourable Mention for the “UNESCO Prize for Peace Education” in 1998.

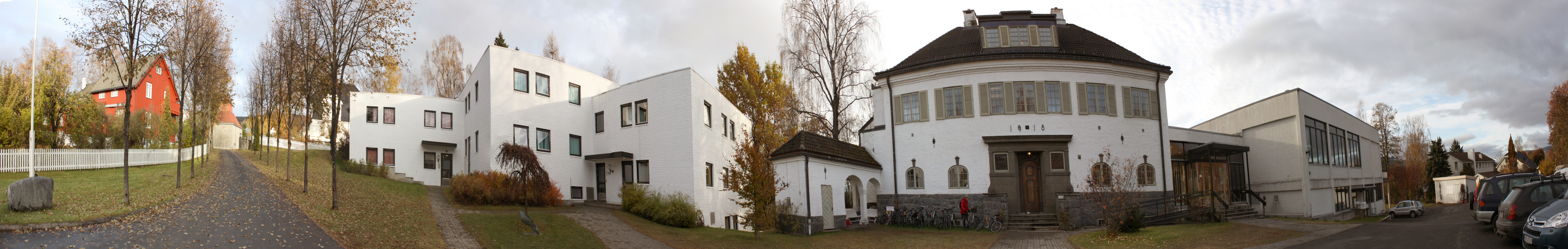
Panorama photograph of the complex of buildings

== Other sources ==
- Forfang, Halvard Grude (1977) Nansenskolen 1936-1940 : to venners drøm og dåd (Oslo : Gyldendal) ISBN 82-05-09335-0

Awards
Preceded by Magli Elster and Torolf Elster	Recipient of the Fritt Ord Award; 1987	Succeeded by Leo Eitinger
