= Dyre Vaa =

Norwegian sculptor and painter

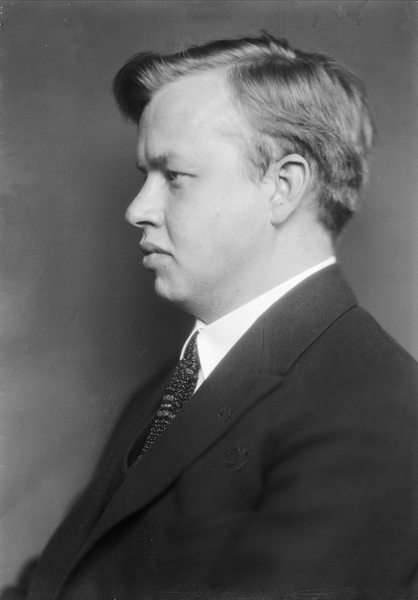
- Dyre Vaa in 1926
- Born: 19 January 1903; Kviteseid Municipality, Norway
- Died: 11 May 1980 (aged 77); Rauland, Norway
- Occupations: Sculptor and painter
- Relatives: Aslaug Vaa (sister); Johan Bojer (father-in-law)
- Awards: King's Medal of Merit in gold (1951); Nidaros Cathedral gold medal (1969)

Dyre Vaa (19 January 1903 – 11 May 1980) was a Norwegian sculptor and painter.

== Background ==
He was born in Kviteseid Municipality in Telemark, and later lived and worked in Rauland Municipality. He was the son of Tor Aanundsson Vaa (1864–1928) and Anne Marie Roholt (1866–1947). Vaa grew up the youngest of five siblings in a wealthy home. His father was one of the largest forest owners in Telemark. He graduated artium at Kristiania Cathedral School in 1920. Vaa studied at the Norwegian National Academy of Craft and Art Industry and at Norwegian National Academy of Fine Arts from 1922 to 1923, under Wilhelm Rasmussen, and later traveled to Spain, Greece and Italy for studies.

== Career ==
In 1925, his first important work was a portrait of Minister of Education Ivar Peterson Tveiten (bronze. National Gallery of Norway). In 1932, Vaa sculptures, paintings and drawings first appeared in Kunstnernes Hus. He served as chairman of the Norwegian Sculptor Association (Norsk Billedhuggerforening) from 1960 to 1962. He continued to work until health problems from the mid-1970s.

== Works ==
Among his works are his Ludvig Holberg sculpture outside Nationaltheatret in Oslo, on 1 September 1939. Further four bronze sculptures with motives from Norwegian fairy tales at Ankerbrua (Peer Gynt, Veslefrikk med fela, Kari Trestakk and Kvitebjørn Kong Valemon), and bronze wolves at Ila (1930). Vaa contributed to the decoration of Oslo City Hall, with the swan fountain in the courtyard (1948–1950). He has made portrayal sculptures of several writers, Henrik Ibsen (1958, Skien), Aasmund Olavsson Vinje (1968), Ivar Aasen, and Olav Aukrust (1955, Lom), the fiddle player Myllarguten (Arabygdi, Rauland), sculptural work at the Nidaros Cathedral in Trondheim, several World War II memorials (Rjukan 1946, Nordfjord 1947, Porsgrunn 1950, Gjerpen 1954), and is represented at the National Gallery of Norway.

== Dyre Vaa Sculptural Art Collection ==
He gave a number of his works to Vinje municipality which formed the basis for the Dyre Vaa Sculptural Art Collection (Dyre Vaa-samlingane). The museum opened 1981 and is operating in conjunction with Vest-Telemark Museum. On display are bronze sculptures and many of his gypsum figures, drawings and sketches.

== Awards ==
Dyre Vaa was awarded the Schäffers legat (1924–25), Aalls legat (1924), Conrad Mohrs legat (1926) and Houens legat (1929). Vaa won the King's Medal of Merit in gold in 1951 and Nidaros Cathedral Gold Medal in 1969. He was made a Knight 1st Class in the Order of St. Olav in 1969.

== Personal life ==
He was the younger brother of lyricist Aslaug Vaa. The writer Tarjei Vesaas and composer Eivind Groven were his second cousins. In 1927, he married Thora Lange Bojer (1902–1999) who was daughter of writer Johan Bojer and was a frequent model in his work. They were the parents of six children. Their son Tor Vaa (1928-2008) was also a sculptor.
