= Ekelund =

Ekelund is a surname of Scandinavian origin. Notable people with the surname include:

- Allan Ekelund (1918–2009), Swedish film producer
- Bo Ekelund (1894–1983), Swedish high jumper
- Henrik Ekelund, Swedish business executive
- Hilding Ekelund (1893–1984), Finnish architect
- Irene Ekelund (born 1997), Swedish athlete
- Kalle Ekelund (born 1990), Swedish ice hockey player
- Karin Ekelund (1913–1976), Swedish actress
- Ole Magnus Ekelund (born 1980), Norwegian handball player
- Peter Ekelund (born 1954), Swedish financier
- Robert Ekelund (born 1940), American economist
- Ronnie Ekelund (born 1972), Danish football player
- Vilhelm Ekelund (1880–1949), Swedish poet
