= Private candidate =

A private candidate, also known as an external candidate, in the UK examination system is a person who enters an examination but is not enrolled as a student at the centre (school or college) where he or she sits the exam. They may have trained themselves for the exam, been taught privately, or studied at an institution which is not a registered examination centre. Centres are not compelled to accept private candidates, and many do not.

The main English examination boards - AQA, OCR, and Edexcel - all accept private candidates. CAIE also accepts private candidates. AQA does not allow private candidates to sit their examinations outside the UK.

The Welsh examination board WJEC allows private candidates. The Northern Irish CCEA uses the term "external candidate" to refer to people in the same situation.

== See also ==
- Education in England
- Education in Wales
- Education in Northern Ireland
