= John Olav Egeland =

Norwegian journalist and editor

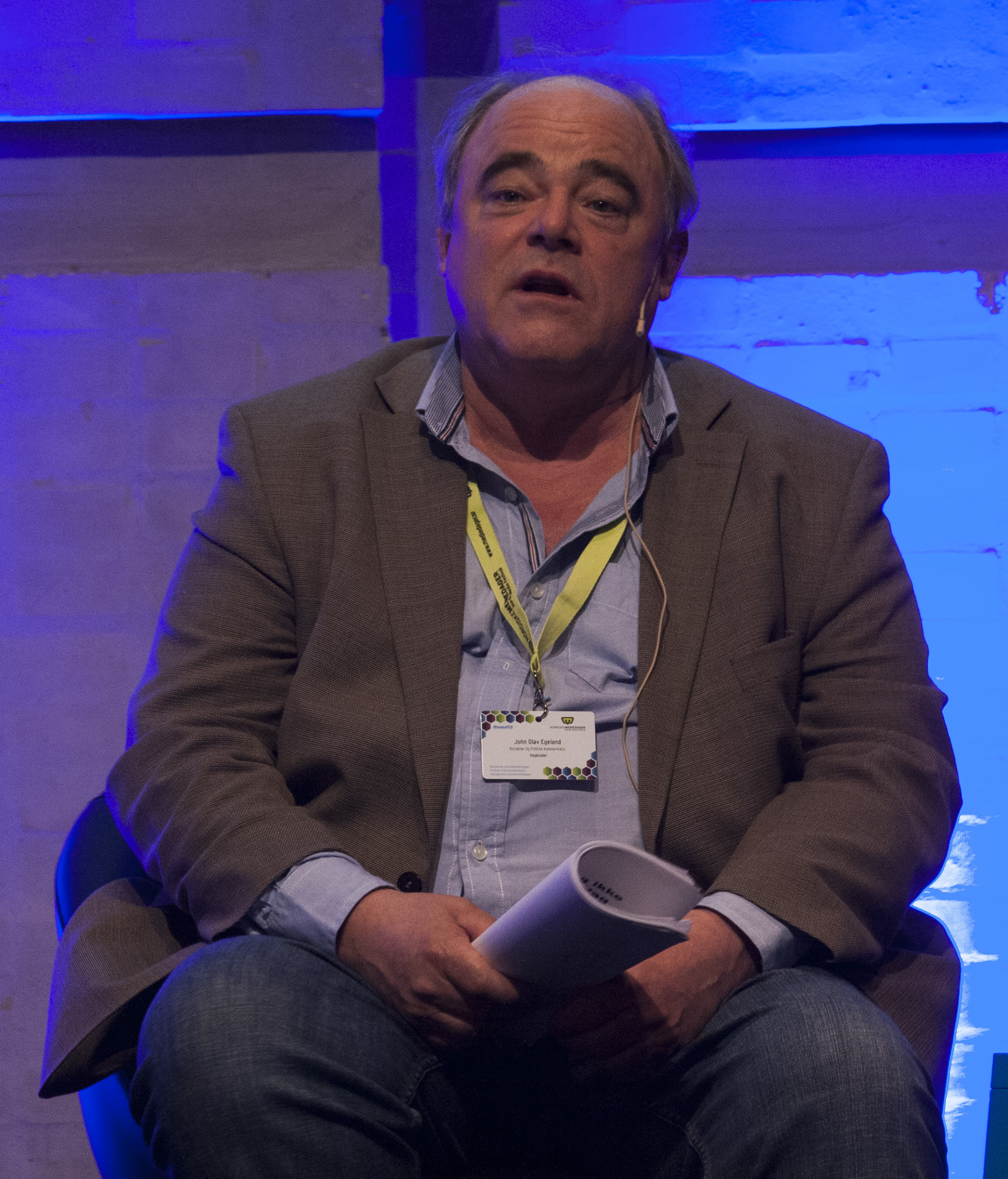
John Olav Egeland, 2013

John Olav Egeland (born 2 November 1951) is a Norwegian journalist and editor.

He was born in Oslo as a son of writer Erik Egeland and grandson of John Oscar Egeland. He was a journalist in Orientering from 1973 to 1975, and was the chief editor of Universitas, student newspaper at the University of Oslo, from 1977 to 1978. In 1978 he was hired as a journalist in Dagbladet. In 1981 he received the Narvesen Prize for journalism. He still works in Dagbladet, and was political editor from 1995 to 2000 and chief editor from 2000 to 2003.

He grew up and resided in Bærum, and wrote a column for the local newspaper Budstikka until moving to Frogner in 2011.

Awards
Preceded by Arne Skouen	Recipient of the Narvesen Prize; 1981 (shared with Erling Borgen)	Succeeded by Vårt Land
Media offices
Preceded by Harald Stanghelle	Chief editor of Dagbladet; 2000–2003	Succeeded by Thor Gjermund Eriksen
