= John Oscar Egeland =

Norwegian businessman (1891–1985)

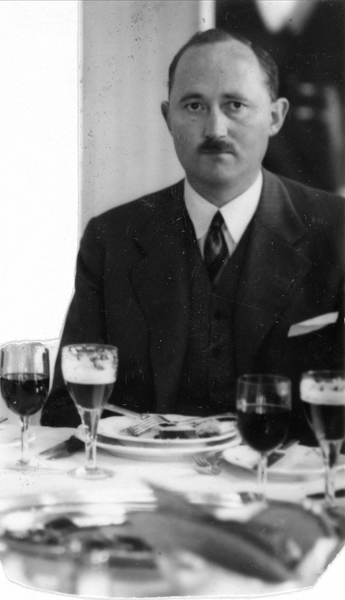
John Oscar Egeland, c. 1935

John Oscar Egeland (14 July 1891 – 2 September 1985) was a Norwegian shipping leader.

He was born in Eshowe, Colony of Natal as a son of Gabriel Egeland (1862–1893) and his wife Ingeborg Konsmo. After the death of his father the family moved back to Norway. Egeland took his examen artium at Kristiania Cathedral School in 1910. He was hired as a secretary in the Norwegian Shipowners' Association in 1916. He worked for the organization in the United States from 1918 to 1919.

He was married to Eva Puntervold Winther (1896–1969) from 1919, and they had the son Erik Egeland, who was the father of journalist and editor John Olav Egeland. In 1975 he got married again, to Else Endresen (1901–1978).

In 1921 he was hired as leader of Kontoret for økonomisk opplysning, a press office for large business organizations including the Shipowners' Association. From 1940 to 1942 he led Nevnden for Oversjøisk Import og Eksport, but it was subdued by Nazi rule in World War II. After the war Egeland was assisting director of the Shipowners' Association from 1946, and acting director from 1948 to his retirement in 1954.

Egeland was a board member of Foreningen Norden, and of the publications Morgenbladet and NÅ. His son worked for both. Egeland wrote three books about Norwegian shipping history: Gjennom brott og brann (released 1968, about the World War II period), Vi skal videre (released 1971, about the post-war period) and Kongeveien (released 1973, about the pre-war period). He died in September 1985 in Oslo.
