= Daniel A. Bell =

Canadian political theorist (born 1964)

- 貝淡寧
- Born: 1964 (age 61–62); Montreal, Quebec, Canada

Academic background
- Education: McGill University; University of Oxford
- Doctoral advisor: David Miller
- Influences: Charles Taylor

Academic work
- Discipline: Political science
- Institutions: University of Hong Kong; Shandong University; Tsinghua University
- Website: https://danielabell1.wordpress.com/

Daniel A. Bell
- Traditional Chinese: 貝淡寧
- Simplified Chinese: 贝淡宁
Transcriptions
Standard Mandarin
- Hanyu Pinyin: Bèi Dànníng
Yue: Cantonese
- Jyutping: bui3 daam6 ning4

Daniel A. Bell (traditional Chinese: 貝淡寧; simplified Chinese: 贝淡宁; born 1964) is a Canadian political theorist. He is currently Chair of Political Theory at the University of Hong Kong Faculty of Law. He was previously Dean of the School of Political Science and Public Administration at Shandong University and professor at Tsinghua University (Schwarzman College and Department of Philosophy).

== Education and career ==
Bell was born in Montreal, educated at McGill University and the University of Oxford, has taught in Singapore, Hong Kong, Beijing, and Shanghai, and has held research fellowships at Princeton's University Center for Human Values, Stanford's Center for Advanced Study in the Behavioral Sciences and Hebrew University's Department of Political Science. In his book The Dean of Shandong he writes about his experiences as a dean at Shandong University between 2017 and 2022 and what they say about China.

He has put forward his views in favour of China's political meritocracy and against one person one vote as a mode of selection for political leaders in the Chinese context and in comments published in The New York Times, the Financial Times, and in regular columns published in The Huffington Post, in Project Syndicate, in The Guardian, as well as the Chinese-language periodical South Reviews (《南风窗》) and a Chinese-language blog site on Caijing (《财经》). He was the recipient of the Huilin Prize in 2018.

== Views ==
Bell describes his interpretation of the Confucian classics as "left Confucianism".

In his book China's New Confucianism (Chinese: 中国新儒家), he argues that Confucian social hierarchies actually contribute to economic equality in China. He also pointed out that Confucianism influenced how he acts a political theorist and a teacher.

Bell contends that Confucian meritocracy is a better political model than liberal democracy. Bell's book The China Model: Political Meritocracy and the Limits of Democracy contends that Westerners often divide the world into "good" democracies and "bad" authoritarian governments and that the Chinese model exists outside of this binary. The text describes the Chinese system as a hybrid model with political meritocracy at the top, experimentation in the middle, and democracy at the grassroots. According to Bell, meritocracy is a primary feature of the China model.

Proposing his view of an ideal political model for China, Bell contends that China should have a legislature composed of a House of Scholars representing the Confucian tradition, a House of the Nation representing the cultural continuity of China, and a democratically-elected House of the People.

== Works ==
Bell is the author of books including:

- Why Ancient Chinese Political Thought Matters: Four Dialogues on China's Past, Present, and Future, Princeton University Press, 2026. ISBN 9780691279800.
- The Dean of Shandong: Confessions of a Minor Bureaucrat at a Chinese University, Princeton University Press, 2023. ISBN 9780691247120.
- Just Hierarchy: Why Social Hierarchies Matter in China and the Rest of the World [co-authored with Wang Pei], Princeton University Press, 2020.
- The China Model: Political Meritocracy and the Limits of Democracy, Princeton University Press, 2015. ISBN 9781400865505.
- The Spirit of Cities: Why the Identity of a City Matters in a Global Age [co-authored with Avner de-Shalit], Princeton University Press, 2011. ISBN 9780691151441.
- China's New Confucianism: Politics and Everyday Life in a Changing Society, Princeton University Press, 2010. ISBN 9781400834822.
- Beyond Liberal Democracy: Political Thinking for an East Asian Context, Princeton University Press, 2006. ISBN 9781400827466.
- East Meets West: Human Rights and Democracy in East Asia, Princeton University Press, 2000. ISBN 9781400823550.
- Towards Liberal Democracy in Pacific Asia [co-authored with David Brown, Kanishka Jayasuriya, and David Martin Jones], Palgrave Macmillan, 1995. ISBN 9780333613993.
- Communitarianism and Its Critics, Oxford University Press, 1993. ISBN 9780198279228.

He is the founding editor of the Princeton-China series by Princeton University Press that aims to translate the original works of Chinese scholars:

- Joseph Chan's Confucian Perfectionism: A Political Philosophy for Modern Times, Princeton University Press, 2013. ISBN 9780691158617.
- Jiang Qing's A Confucian Constitutional Order: How China's Ancient Past Can Shape Its Political Future [co-edited with Ruiping Fan, Translated by Edmund Ryden], Princeton University Press, 2012. ISBN 9780691154602.
- Yan Xuetong's Ancient Chinese Thought, Modern Chinese Power [co-edited with Sun Zhe, Translated by Edmund Ryden], Princeton University Press, 2011. ISBN 9780691148267.

He is also the editor/co-editor of several books:

- Being Chinese, Becoming Chinese: Interdisciplinary Reflections on Chinese Identity, The Chinese University of Hong Kong Press, 2025. ISBN 9789882373600.
- The East Asian Challenge for Democracy: Political Meritocracy in Comparative Perspective [co-edited with Chenyang Li], Cambridge University Press, 2013. ISBN 9781107623774.
- Confucian Political Ethics, Princeton University Press, 2007. ISBN 9781400828661.
- Ethics in Action: The Ethical Challenges of International Human Rights Nongovernmental Organizations [co-edited with Jean-Marc Coicaud], Cambridge University Press, 2006. ISBN 9780521684491.
- The Politics of Affective Relations: East Asia and Beyond (Global Encounters: Studies in Comparative Political Theory series) [co-edited with Hahm Chaihark], Lexington Books, 2004. ISBN 9780739107997.
- Confucianism for the Modern World [co-edited with Hahm Chaibong], Cambridge University Press, 2003.ISBN 9780521527880.
- Forms of Justice: Critical Perspectives on David Miller's Political Philosophy [co-edited with Avner de-Shalit], Rowman & Littlefield Publishers, 2002. ISBN 9780742521797.
- The East Asian Challenge for Human Rights [co-edited with Joanne R. Bauer], Cambridge University Press, 1999. ISBN 9780521645362.
