= 1971 in Norway =

- Centuries: 18th; 19th; 20th; 21st
- Decades: 1950s; 1960s; 1970s; 1980s; 1990s
- See also: List of years in Norway

Events in the year 1971 in Norway.

== Incumbents ==
- Monarch – Olav V.
- Prime Minister – Per Borten (Centre Party) until 17 October, Trygve Bratteli (Labour Party)

== Events ==
- Municipal and county elections are held throughout the country.
- 13 February – Amendments to the Helsinki Treaty of Co-operation between Denmark, Finland, Iceland, Norway, and Sweden are signed.
- 17 March – Bratteli's First Cabinet was appointed.
- 22 May – A fire breaks out in the crew quarters of the Norwegian passenger ship MS Meteor near Vancouver, Canada. The vessel is evacuated after an explosion and blaze; 32 crew members are killed.
- 14 June – The Storting adopt the "Ten Oil Commandments", formulated by Rolf Hellem of the Labour Party, outlining key principles for Norway’s petroleum policy.
- July – American saxophonist Sonny Rollins performs at the Kongsberg Jazz Festival, joined by pianist Bobo Stenson, bassist Arild Andersen, and drummer Jon Christensen.
- 5 September – The first Kalvøya Festival is held with Finn Kalvik, Kristin Berglund, Jan Garbarek and Ruphus; the starting point for Norway's largest rock festival.
- 24 October – Rosenborg defeat Fredrikstad 4-1 in the Norwegian Cup Final at Ullevaal Stadium in Oslo.

=== Undated ===
- Per Arneberg, poet, prosaist and translator is awarded the Riksmål Society Literature Prize.
- Arild Nyquist, novelist, poet, children's writer and musician, is awarded the Mads Wiel Nygaard's Endowment literary prize.

== Notable births ==
=== January to March ===
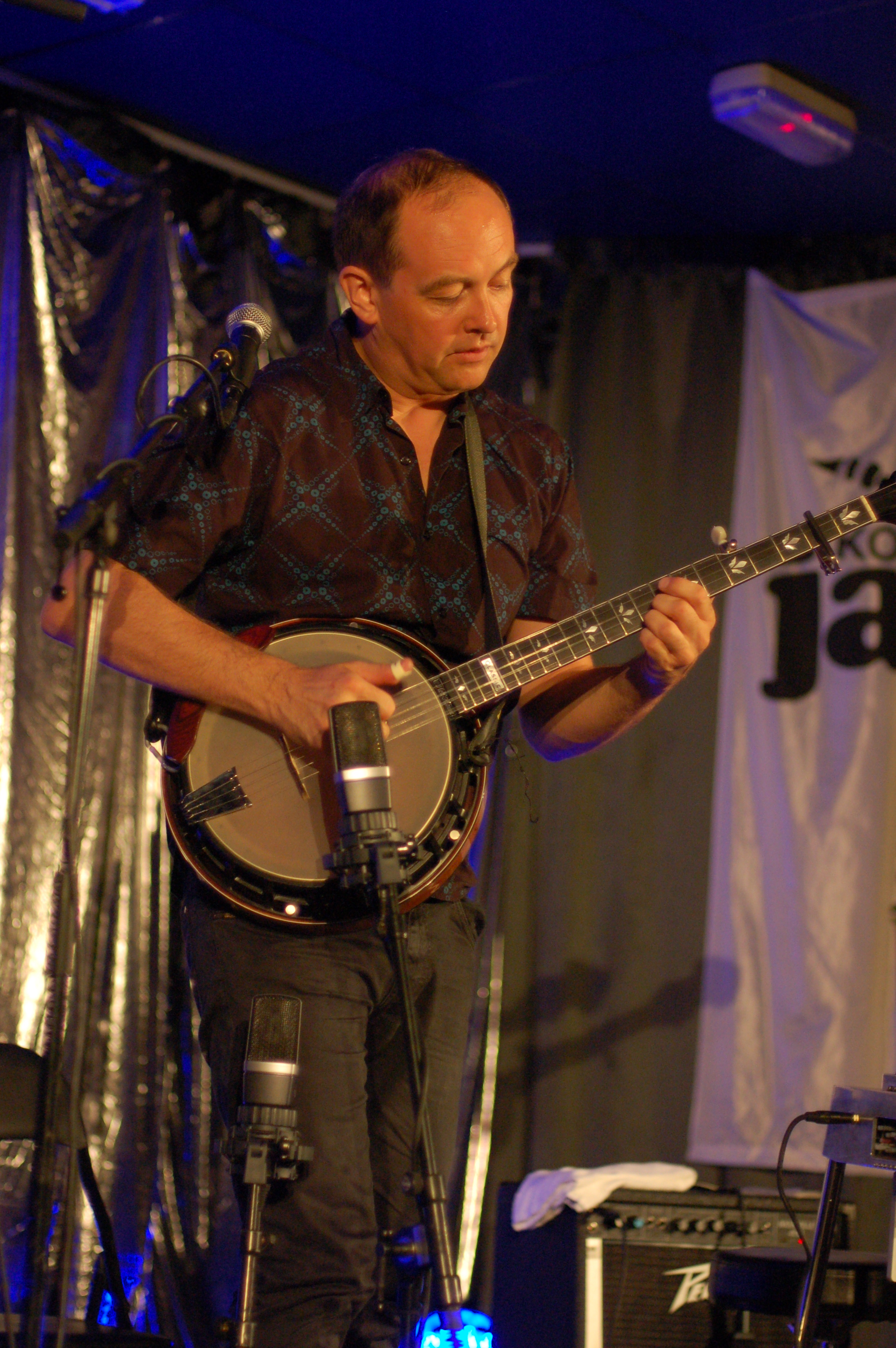
Stian Carstensen

- 5 January – Stian Carstensen, musician.
- 15 January – Agnete Carlsen, footballer.
- 21 January – Per-Willy Amundsen, politician.
- 1 February – Harald Brattbakk, footballer and pilot
- 8 February – Steinar Hoen, high jumper.
- 18 February – May Britt Lagesen, politician
- 18 March – Hilde Synnøve Lid, freestyle skier
- 19 March – Rikard Spets, politician.
- 22 March – Laila Goody, actress.
- 24 March – Bengt Rune Strifeldt, politician.

=== April to June ===
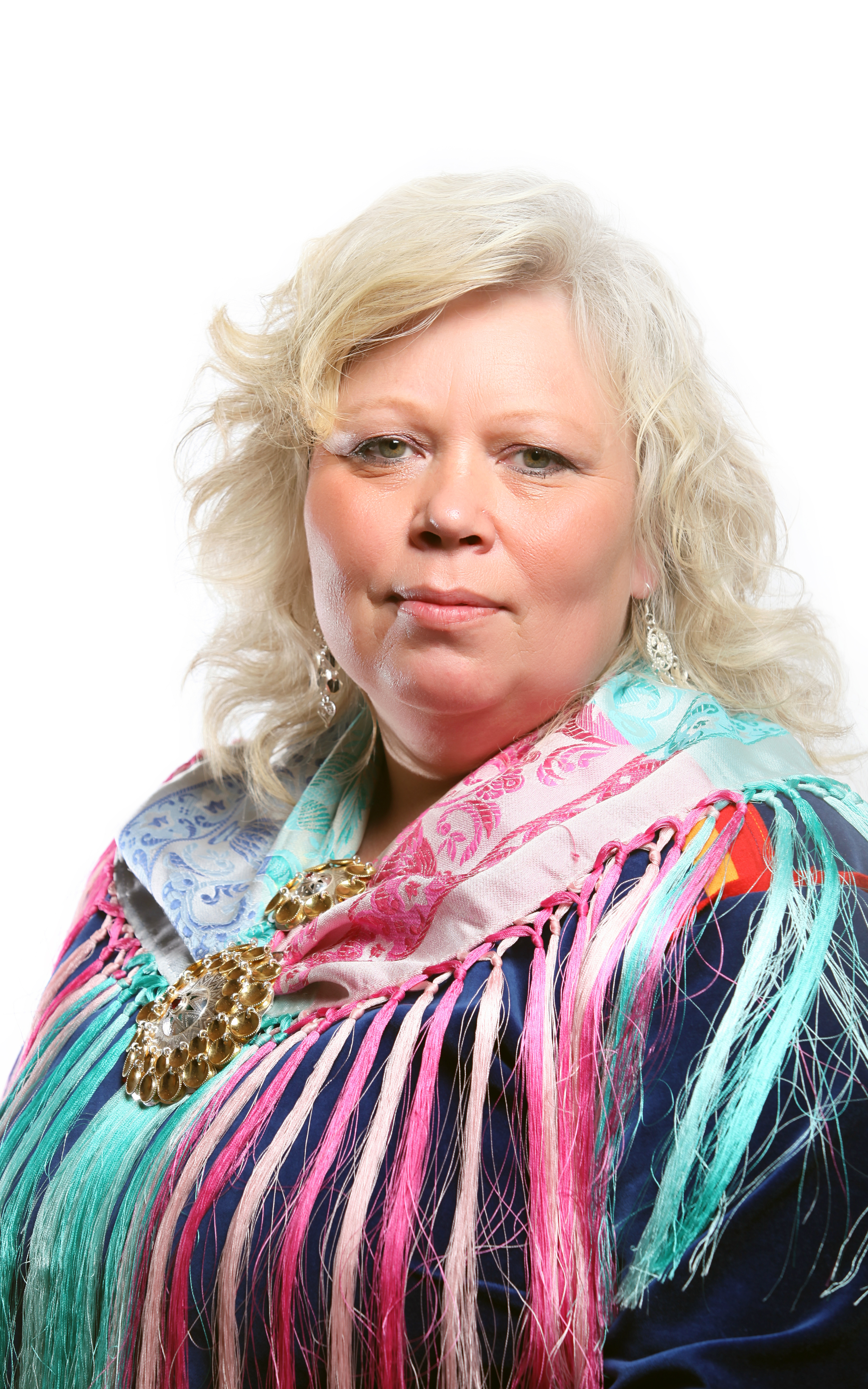
Vibeke Larsen

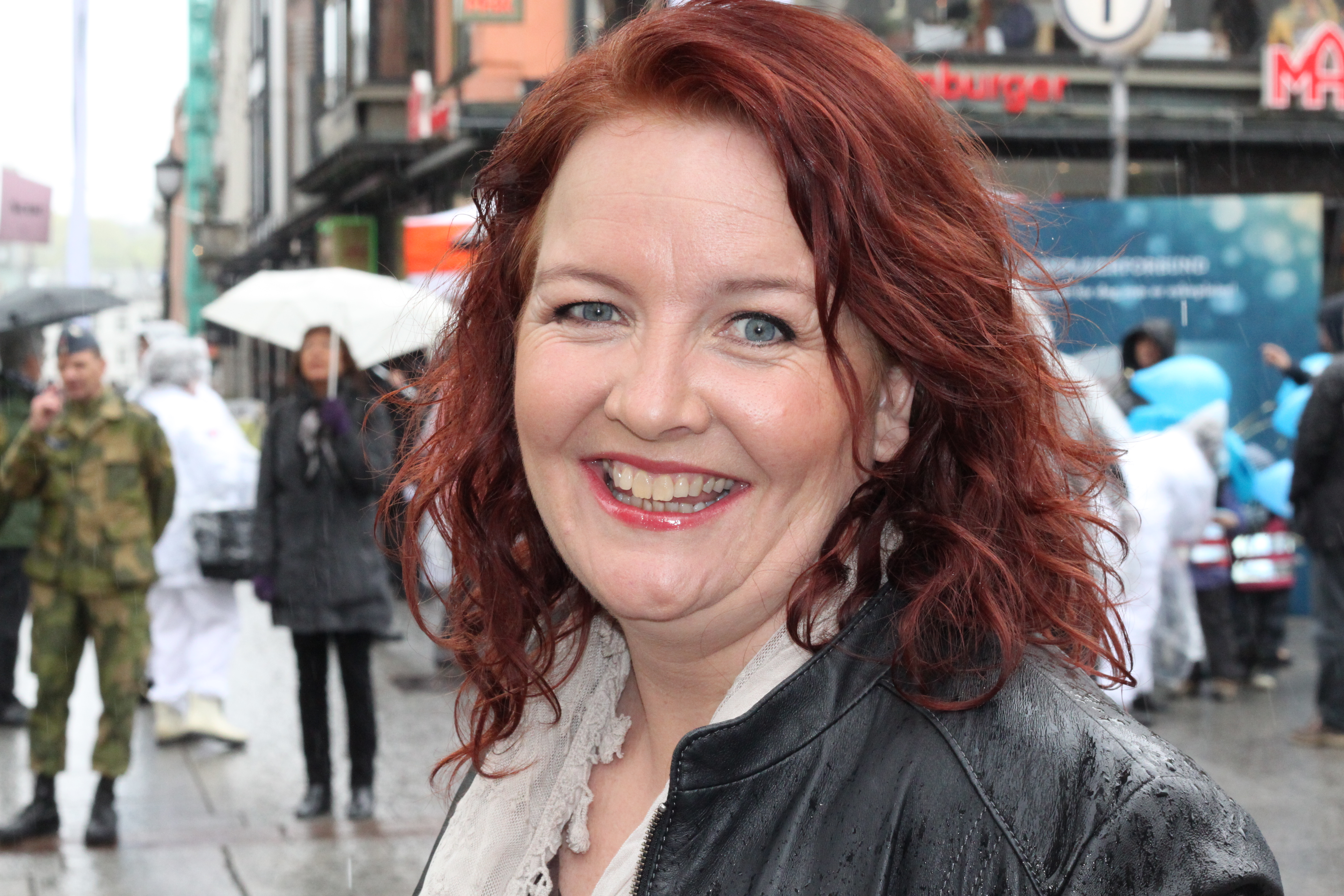
Dagrun Eriksen

- 3 April – Ingvild Vaggen Malvik, politician
- 3 April – Eirik Lae Solberg, politician.
- 5 April – Åslaug Sem-Jacobsen, politician
- 6 April – Marit Eikemo, writer.
- 6 April – Mona Grudt, model and 1990 Miss Universe
- 21 April – Solveig Slettahjell, jazz singer.
- 25 April – Heidi Olufsen, diplomat.
- 25 April – Trygve Seim, jazz musician.
- 4 May – Bent Høie, politician.
- 5 May – Charles Tjessem, chef.
- 10 May – Vegard Høidalen, volleyball player.
- 12 May – Kristin Asbjørnsen, singer and composer.
- 13 May – Espen Lind, songwriter, producer, singer, and multi-instrumentalist
- 16 May – Pia Wedege, luger
- 20 May – Hanne Stenvaag, politician
- 31 May – Jon Øigarden, actor.
- 10 June – Solveig Kloppen, comedian.
- 11 June – Gudrun Skretting, pianist and children's writer
- 15 June – Vibeke Larsen, politician
- 17 June – Espen Sandberg, film director.
- 28 June – Dagrun Eriksen, politician
- 28 June – Steinar Opstad, poet
- 29 June – Bjørnar Teigen, actor, playwright and stage director.

=== July to September ===
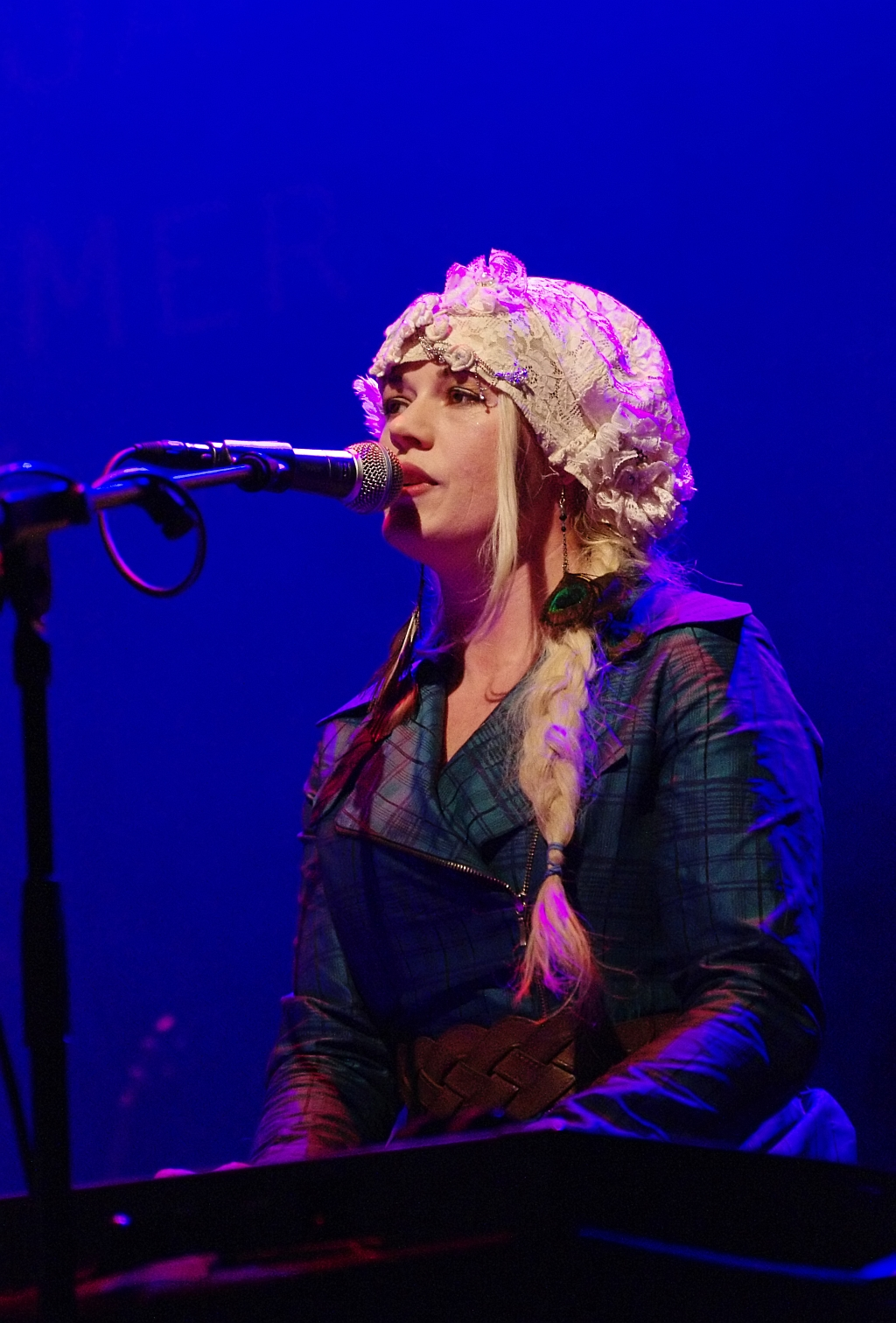
Unni Wilhelmsen

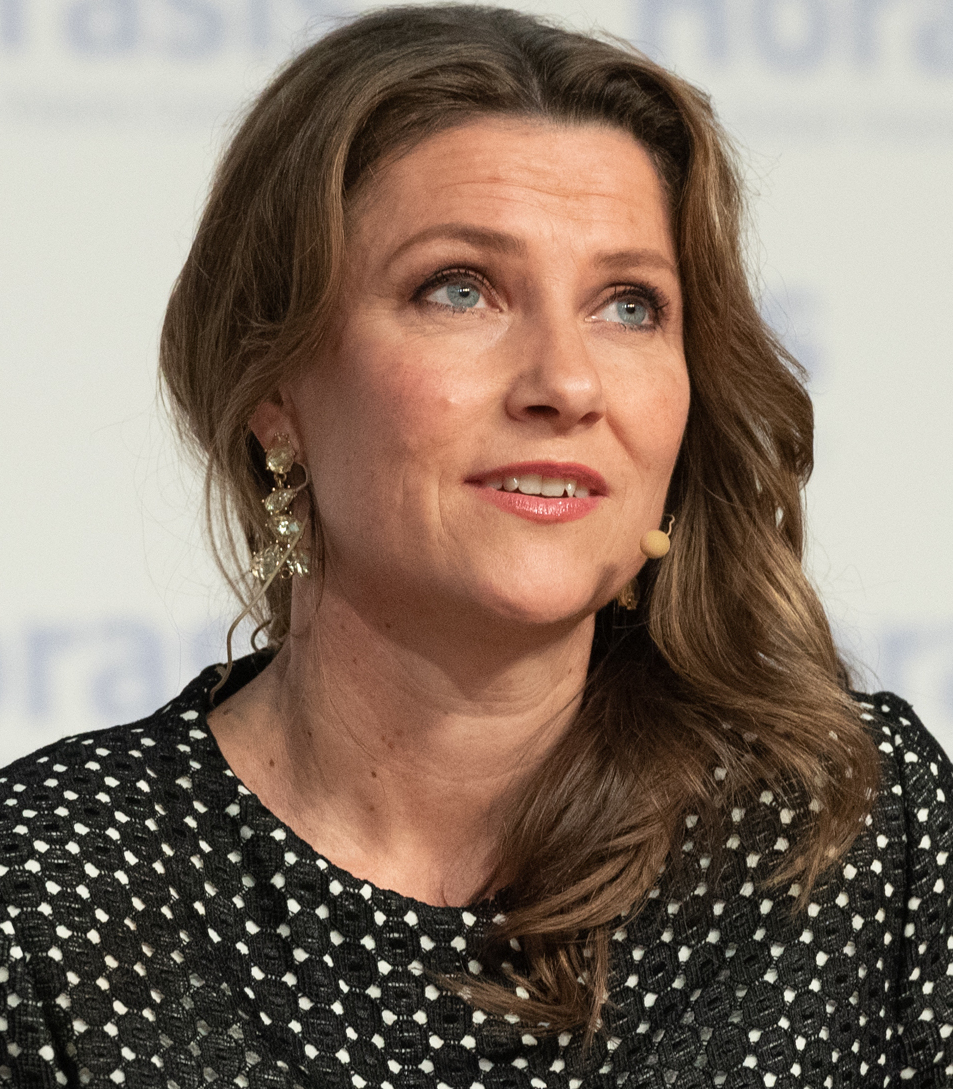
Märtha Louise

- 12 July – Lars Lervik, military officer.
- 12 July – Unni Wilhelmsen, singer and songwriter.
- 20 July – Guro Angell Gimse, politician.
- 21 July – Erik Mykland, footballer.
- 26 July – Marita Liabø, writer.
- 29 July – Nils-Øivind Haagensen, writer and editor.
- 1 August – Anne Lindboe, politician.
- 30 August – Ole Klemetsen, boxer.
- 7 September – Kjersti Grini, handball player.
- 9 September – Ann Cathrin Eriksen, handball player
- 12 September – Tom Strømstad Olsen, politician
- 22 September – Märtha Louise, princess.
- 29 September –
  - Kyrre Andreassen, writer.
  - Frida Melvær, politician

=== October to December ===
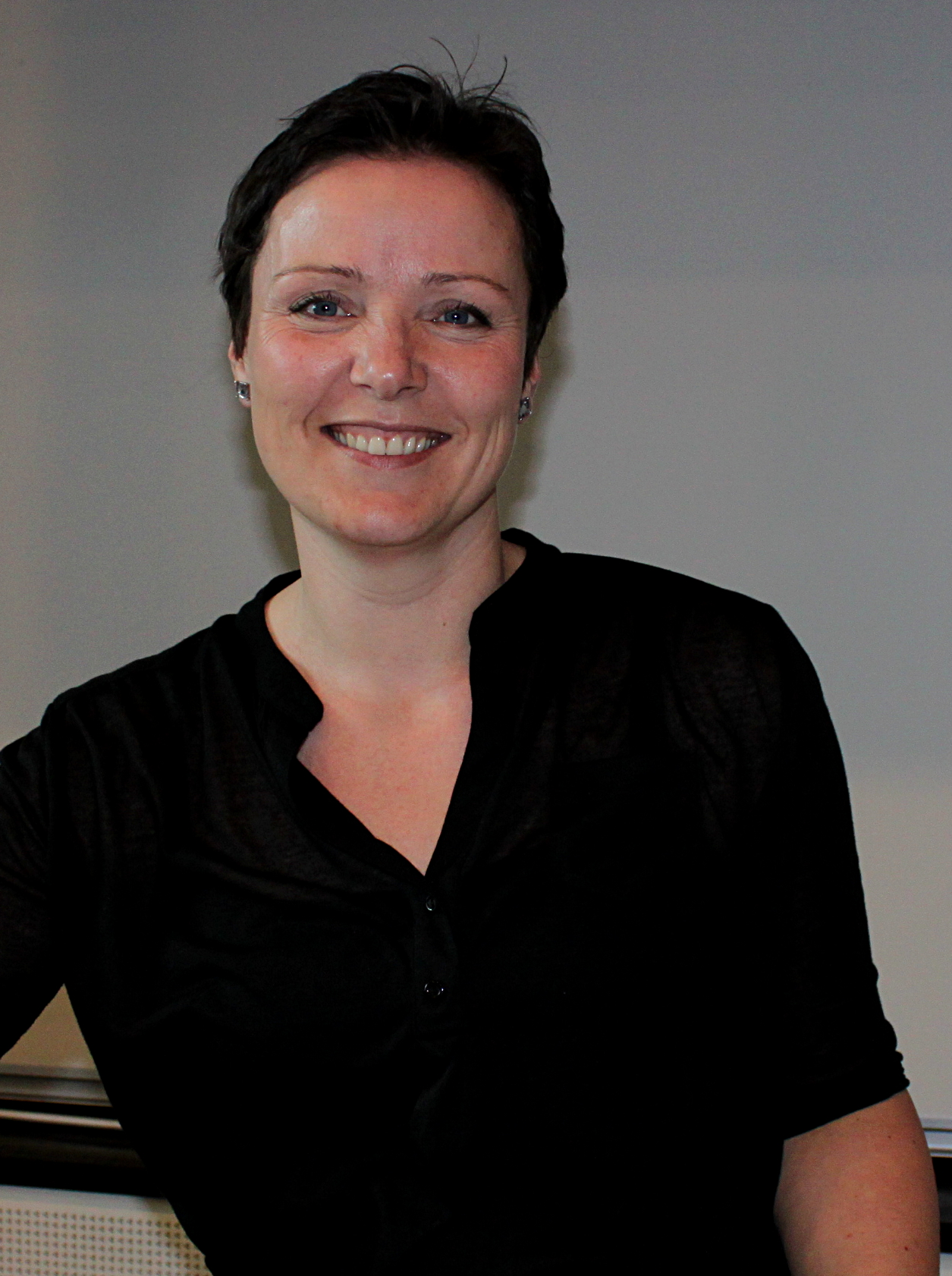
Linn T. Sunne

- 2 October – Anette Igland, footballer
- 4 October – Trond Espen Seim, actor.
- 5 October – Ole Robert Reitan, businessperson
- 15 October – Annbjørg Lien, fiddler.
- 18 October – Line Henriette Holten Hjemdal, politician
- 21 October – Thomas Ulsrud, curler (died 2022).
- 23 October – Marianne Aulie, painter.
- 28 October – Siri Pettersen, writer.
- 16 November – Anne Hagenborg, politician
- 17 November – Tonje Sagstuen, handball player
- 22 November – Geir Hartly Andreassen, cinematographer
- 22 November – Gunnar Wærness, poet
- 2 December – Linn T. Sunne, children's writer
- 10 December – Arnfinn Kristiansen, bobsledder
- 16 December – Anita Krohn Traaseth, business executive.

== Notable deaths ==
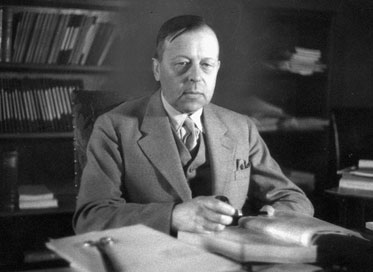
Gunnar Jahn

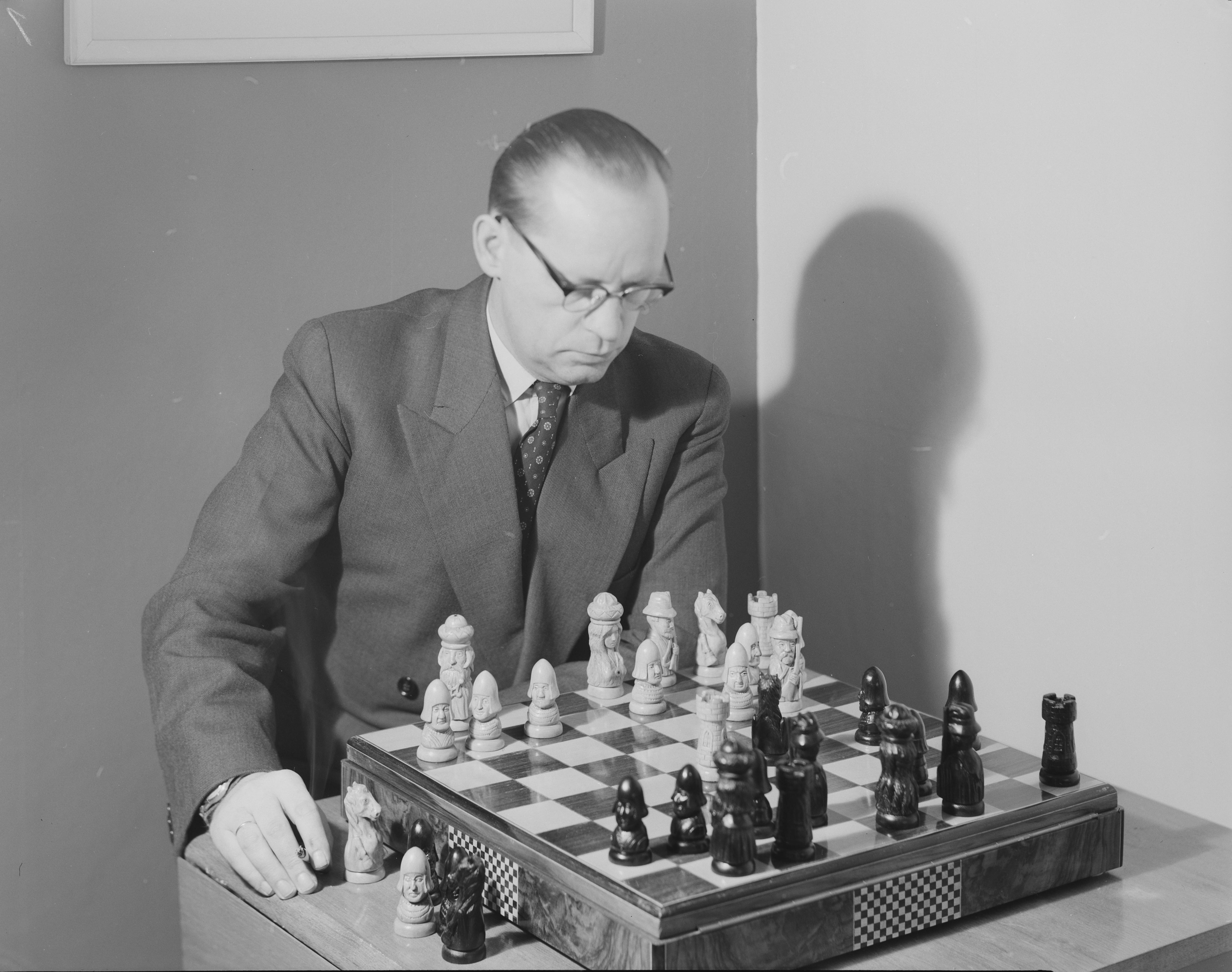
Olaf Barda

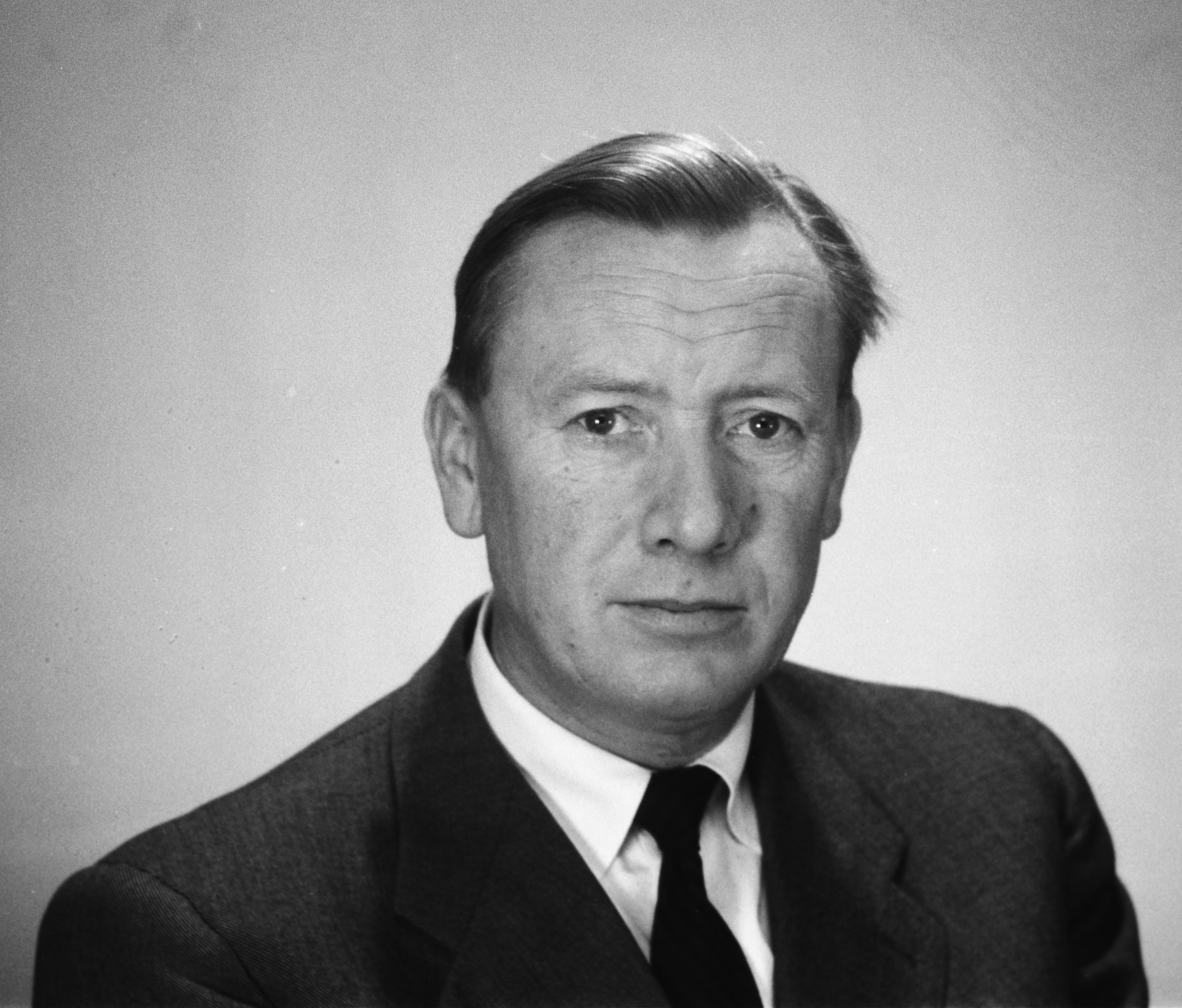
Erling Viksjø

- 5 January – Elling M. Solheim, writer (born 1905).
- 16 January – Halfdan Gran Olsen, rower and Olympic bronze medallist (b.1910)
- 29 January – Bjarne Guldager, sprinter (b.1897)
- 31 January – Gunnar Jahn, jurist, economist and politician (b.1883)
- 21 February – Johs Haugerud, politician (b.1896)
- 24 February – Hartvig Svendsen, politician (b.1902)
- 1 March – Harald Damsleth, cartoonist, illustrator and ad-man (b.1906)
- 11 March – Julius Sundsvik, novelist and newspaper editor (b.1891)
- 1 April – Hans Svarstad, politician (b.1883)
- 2 May – Olaf Barda, chess player, first Norwegian International Master (b.1909)
- 24 May – Haakon Hansen, politician (b.1907)
- 1 June – Aksel Jacobsen Bogdanoff, communist (b.1922)
- 2 June – Per Mathiesen, gymnast and Olympic gold medallist (b.1885)
- 26 June – Halvor Birkeland, sailor and Olympic gold medallist (b.1894)
- 29 June – Thorstein John Ohnstad Fretheim, politician (b.1886)
- 15 July – Nic. Stang, art historian and writer (b.1908)
- 16 July – Birger Brandtzæg, merchant and owner of a fishing station (b.1893)
- 19 July – Hans Kristian Bromstad, politician (b.1903)
- 20 July – Olaf Ingebretsen, gymnast and Olympic bronze medallist (b.1892)
- 6 August – Finn Moe, politician (b.1902)
- 19 August – Arthur Sundt, politician (b.1899)
- 4 September – Bjarne Lyngstad, politician and Minister (b.1901)
- 23 September – Signy Arctander, statistician and economist (b.1895)
- 29 September – Johannes Lid, botanist (b.1886)
- 5 October – Marit Hemstad, sprinter (b.1928)
- 5 October – Marit Øiseth, cross country skier (b.1928)
- 17 October – Leif Grøner, banker and politician (b.1884)
- 22 October – Håkon Ellingsen, rower and Olympic bronze medallist (b.1894)
- 18 November – Leif Bjorholt Burull, politician (b.1895)
- 24 November – Nils Hønsvald, politician and Minister (b.1899)
- 2 December – Erling Viksjø, architect (b.1910)
- 10 December – Arne Langset, politician (b.1893)
- 12 December – Kristian Johan Bodøgaard, politician (b.1885)
- 20 December – Svale Solheim, folklorist (born 1903).
