= 1903 in Norway =

- Centuries: 18th; 19th; 20th; 21st
- Decades: 1880s; 1890s; 1900s; 1910s; 1920s
- See also: 1903 in Sweden; List of years in Norway

Events in the year 1903 in Norway.

== Incumbents ==
- Monarch: Oscar II.
- Prime Minister: Otto Blehr, then Francis Hagerup

== Events ==
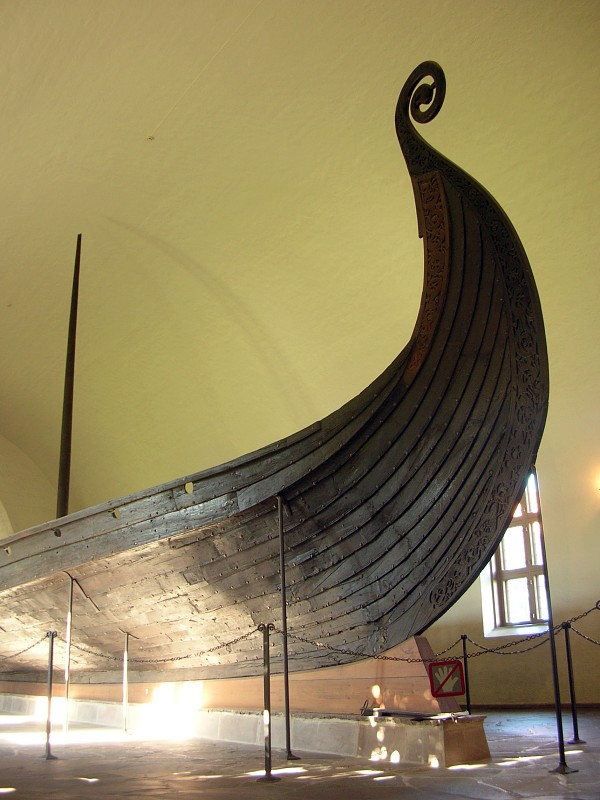
The Oseberg ship was discovered.

- 16 June – Roald Amundsen commences the first east-west navigation of the Northwest Passage by leaving Oslo, Norway.
- 10 August – The Oseberg ship, a well-preserved Viking ship from the 9th century, was discovered in a large burial mound at the Oseberg farm near Tønsberg in the Vestfold county.
- 22 October – Francis Hagerup succeeded Otto Blehr as Prime Minister of Norway
- The 1903 Parliamentary election takes place.

== Popular culture ==
=== Sports ===
- 31 January–6 February – The Nordic Games take place in Kristiania.
- 7 April – Fredrikstad FK (FFK) is founded.

=== Music ===
- Edvard Grieg, in Paris, became the first Norwegian to make gramophone records.

== Births ==
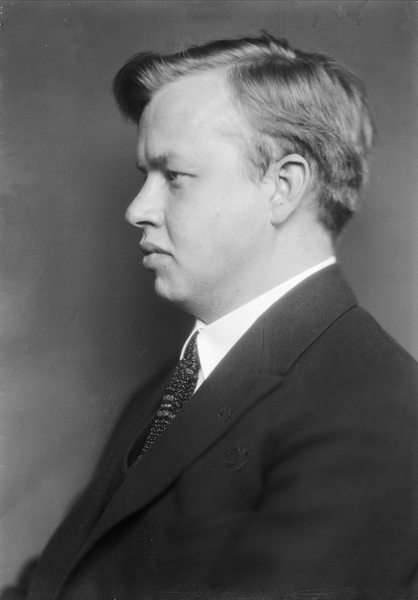
Dyre Vaa

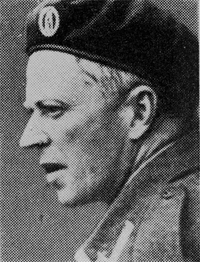
Leif Tronstad

- 5 January – Kirsten Hansteen, politician and Minister, first female member of cabinet in Norway (died 1974).
- 19 January – Dyre Vaa, sculptor and painter (died 1980).
- 29 January – Olav Rytter, newspaper editor, radio personality, foreign correspondent, philologist and translator (died 1992)
- 3 February – Johan Strand Johansen, politician and Minister (died 1970)
- 25 February – Olav Kjetilson Nylund, politician (died 1957)
- 15 March – Svale Solheim, folklorist (died 1971).
- 17 March – Olav Meisdalshagen, politician and Minister (died 1959)
- 27 March – Leif Tronstad, scientist, intelligence officer and military organizer (died 1945).
- 28 March – Hans Kristian Bromstad, politician (died 1971)
- 24 April – Anders Platou Wyller, philologist and humanist (died 1940)
- 27 April – Tor Skjønsberg, resistance leader, politician and Minister (died 1993)
- 28 April – Egil Rasmussen, author, literature critic and musician (died 1964)
- 2 May – Øivin Fjeldstad, conductor and violinist (died 1983)
- 19 May – Karl Eugen Hammerstedt, politician (died 1960)
- 24 May – Gudbrand Bernhardsen Tandberg, politician (died 1949)
- 26 May – Sverre Helgesen, high jumper (died 1981)
- 1 June – Hans Vogt, linguist (died 1986)
- 3 June – Tobias Gedde-Dahl, physician (died 1994).
- 10 June – Ferdinand Strøm, dentist and a pioneer in developing forensic dentistry in Norway (died 1990).
- 14 June – Nils Helgheim, politician (died 1982)
- 17 June – Halvor Bunkholt, politician (died 1978)
- 25 June – Kai Knudsen, politician (died 1977)
- 26 June – Iver Johan Unsgård, politician (died 1993)
- 2 July – Olav V, King of Norway (died 1991)
- 4 July – Hans Jacob Ustvedt, medical doctor and broadcasting administrator (died 1982)
- 12 July – Haldis Tjernsberg, politician (died 1972)
- 31 July – Sigmund Skard, poet, essayist and professor of literature (died 1995)
- 11 August – Arnvid Vasbotten, jurist, Nazi civil servant and politician (died 1995).
- 17 August – Bjarne Amdahl, pianist, composer and orchestra conductor (died 1968).
- 17 August – Kittill Kristoffersen Berg, politician (died 1983)
- 17 August – Olav Sunde, javelin thrower and Olympic bronze medallist (died 1985)
- 29 August – Ole Stenen, Nordic skier, Olympic silver medallist and World Champion (died 1975)
- 15 September – Trygve Braarud, botanist (died 1985)
- 23 September – Egil Sundt, civil servant (died 1950).
- 24 September – Andreas Martinius Andersen, civil servant.
- 15 October – Erik Anker, sailor and Olympic gold medallist (died 1994)
- 30 October – Leif Rustad, cellist and radio pioneer (died 1976).
- 7 November – Ståle Kyllingstad, sculptor (died 1987).
- 20 November – Leif Skagnæs, Nordic combined skier
- 24 November – Sverre Bernhard Nybø, politician (died 1976)
- 27 November – Karen Grønn-Hagen, politician and Minister (died 1982)
- 27 November – Lars Onsager, physical chemist and theoretical physicist, winner of the 1968 Nobel Prize in Chemistry (died 1976)
- 30 November – Einar Østvedt, historian and educator (died 1980).
- 6 December – Kristian Hovde, cross country skier (died 1969)
- 15 December – Georg Braathe, long distance runner (died 1968)

== Notable deaths ==
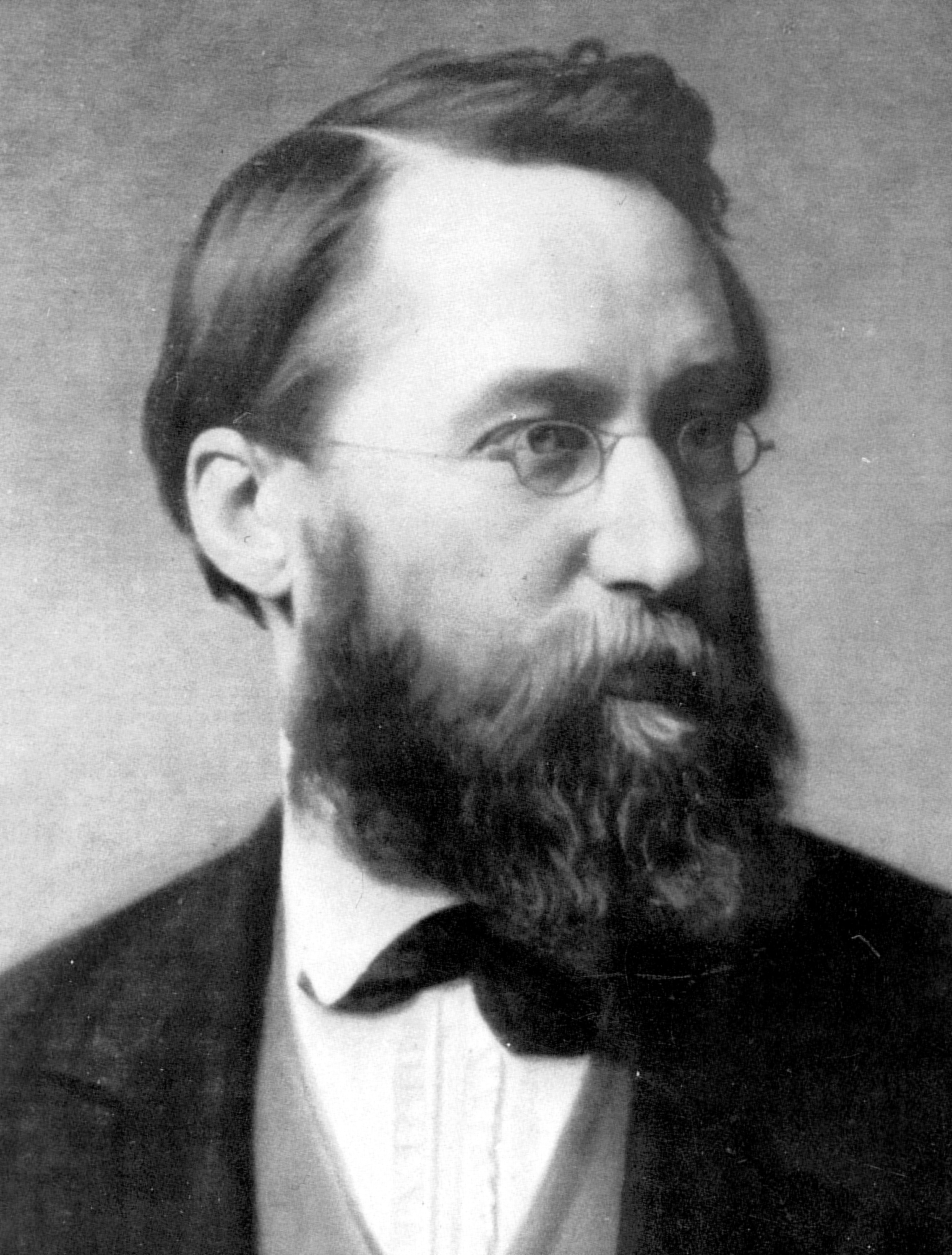
Hans Gude

- 4 January – Christian Fredrik Sissenèr, property owner and politician (born 1849)
- 20 March – Carl Anton Bjerknes, mathematician and physicist (born 1825)
- 22 June – Torbjørg Utne, hotelier (born 1812).
- 17 August – Hans Gude, painter (born 1825)
- 28 August – Hans Hein Theodor Nysom, politician (born 1845)
- 10 October – Jacob Thurmann Ihlen, politician (born 1833)
- 12 October – Olaus Alvestad, educator and newspaper editor (born 1866)
- 27 October – Erika Nissen, pianist (born 1845)
