= Marita =

Marita may refer to:

== People ==
- Marita Aronson (born 1939), Swedish politician
- Marita Bonner (1899–1971), African-American writer
- Marita Camacho Quirós (1911–2025), First Lady of Costa Rica and a supercentenarian
- Marita Conlon-McKenna (born 1956), Irish writer
- Marita Crawley (born 1954), British songwriter and playwright
- Marita Geraghty (born 1965), American television character actress
- Marita Grabiak, 21st century American television director
- Marita Johansson (born 1984), Swedish speed skater
- Marita Koch (born 1957), East German sprinter
- Marita Lange (1943–2025), East German shot putter
- Marita Liabø (born 1971), Norwegian author
- Marita Lindahl (1938–2017), Miss World 1957
- Marita Liulia (born 1957), Finnish media artist and director
- Marita Lorenz (1939–2019), German woman who had an affair with Fidel Castro and betrayed a CIA assassination attempt against him
- Marita Mathijsen (born 1944), Dutch academic
- Marita Payne (born 1960), Canadian sprinter
- Maria Perceval (born 1956), Argentine politician nicknamed "Marita"
- Marita Petersen (1940–2001), Prime Minister of the Faroe Islands
- Marita Ruoho (born 1949), Finnish orienteer
- Marita Skogum (born 1961), Swedish orienteer
- Marita Ulvskog (born 1951), Swedish politician
- Marita Zobel (born 1941), Filipina actress
- Fibriani Ratna Marita (born 1994), Indonesian swimmer
- Quinctia Marita (fl. 1st century), ancient Roman freedwoman

== Fictional characters ==
- Marita (hippo), on the television series Animaniacs
- Marita Covarrubias, on the television series The X-Files

== Other uses ==
- Operation Marita (Unternehmen Marita), the German World War II invasion of Greece
- Mariţa (disambiguation), various things in Romania
- Marita (gastropod), a genus of sea snails
