= 1849 in Norway =

- Centuries: 17th; 18th; 19th; 20th; 21st
- Decades: 1820s; 1830s; 1840s; 1850s; 1860s
- See also: 1849 in Sweden; List of years in Norway

Events in the year 1849 in Norway.

== Incumbents ==
- Monarch: Oscar I.
- First Minister: Nicolai Krog

== Events ==
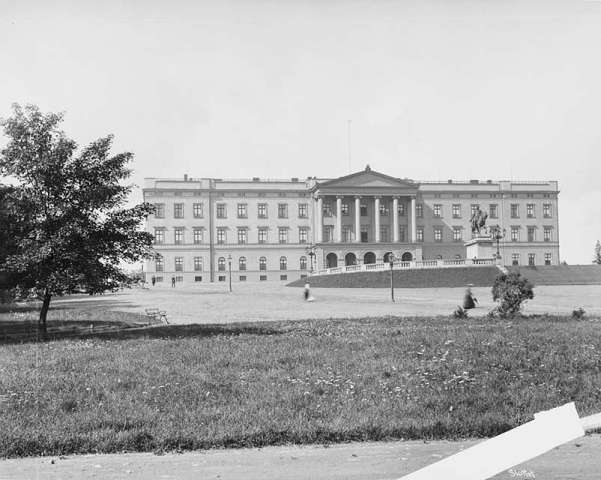
The official inauguration of the Norwegian Royal Palace

- 21 March – Hamar was refounded as a city (lost its city status in 1587).
- 26 July – The official inauguration of the Norwegian Royal Palace (Norwegian: Slottet or formally Det kongelige slott), which occurred during the reign of Oscar I.
- Ryvarden Lighthouse was established.

== Births ==
- 18 February – Alexander Kielland, novelist (died 1906)
- 8 March – Eduard Boeckmann, Norwegian American ophthalmologist, physician and inventor. (died 1927)
- 9 March – Nils P. Haugen, U.S. Representative from Wisconsin (died 1931)
- 5 June – Vilhelm Andreas Wexelsen, bishop and politician (died 1909)
- 15 December – Amund B. Larsen, linguist (died 1928)
- 19 December – Joachim Grieg, ship broker and politician (died 1932).

=== Full date unknown ===
- Marcus Olaus Bockman, priest and theologian (died 1942)
- Hans Dahl, painter (died 1937)
- Johan Leonard Hagen, politician
- Jon Eriksson Helland II, Hardanger fiddle maker (died 1869)
- Birger Kildal, politician and Minister (died 1913)
- Christian Fredrik Sissenèr, property owner and politician (died 1903)

== Deaths ==
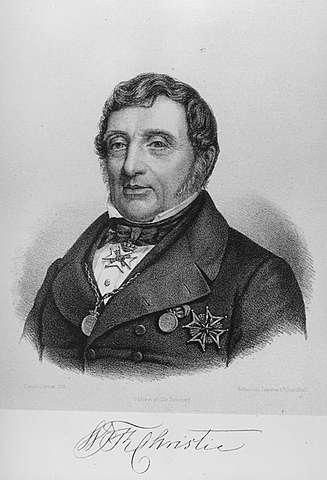
Wilhelm Frimann Koren Christie

- 13 May – Gjest Baardsen, outlaw, jail-breaker, non-fiction writer, songwriter and memoirist (born 1791).
- 6 July – Olaf Rye, military officer (born 1791)
- 10 October – Wilhelm Frimann Koren Christie, a Norwegian constitutional father, known for being the constitutional assembly's writer (born 1778)
- 6 December – Peder Olivarius Bugge, bishop (born 1764)
