= Haagensen =

Haagensen or Hågensen is a Norwegian surname. Notable people with the surname include:

- Jonathan Haagensen (born 1983), Brazilian actor and model
- Karl Haagensen (1871–1918), Norwegian gymnast
- Nils-Øivind Haagensen (born 1971), Norwegian journalist and poet
- Phellipe Haagensen (born 1984), Brazilian actor
- Svein Haagensen (born 1939), Norwegian ice hockey player
- Yngve Hågensen (1938–2023), Norwegian trade unionist and writer
