= Randulf Dalland =

Norwegian politician (1900–1984)

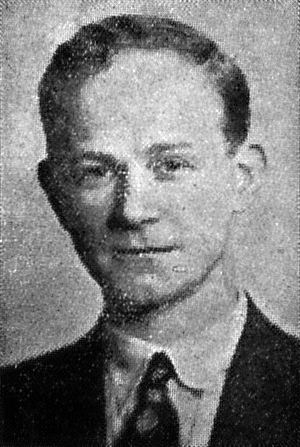

Randulf Dalland (4 May 1900 – 9 November 1984) was a Norwegian politician for the Communist Party.

Dalland was born in Bergen and was the brother of Bjarne Dalland. He elected to the Norwegian Parliament from Bergen in 1945. but was not re-elected in 1949 as the Communist Party dropped from 11 to 0 seats in Parliament.

Dalland was a member of the municipal council for Odda Municipality during the term 1931–1934, and a member of the municipal council for Bergen Municipality in 1934–1937.

From 1930 to 1932, he was editor-in-chief of Hardanger Arbeiderblad. He travelled to the Soviet Union in 1935 to attend the International Lenin School in Moscow, and fought in the Spanish Civil War in 1937. From 1950 to 1965 he was Party Secretary of the Communist Party.
