= Ottar Lie =

Norwegian communist and resistance member

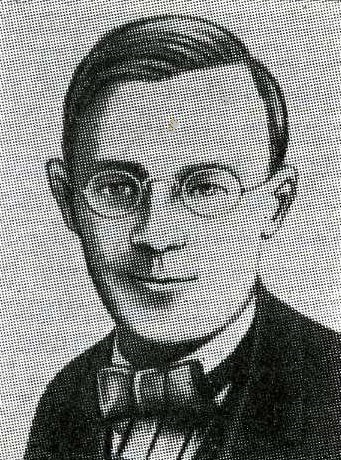
Drawing of Ottar Lie from around 1930

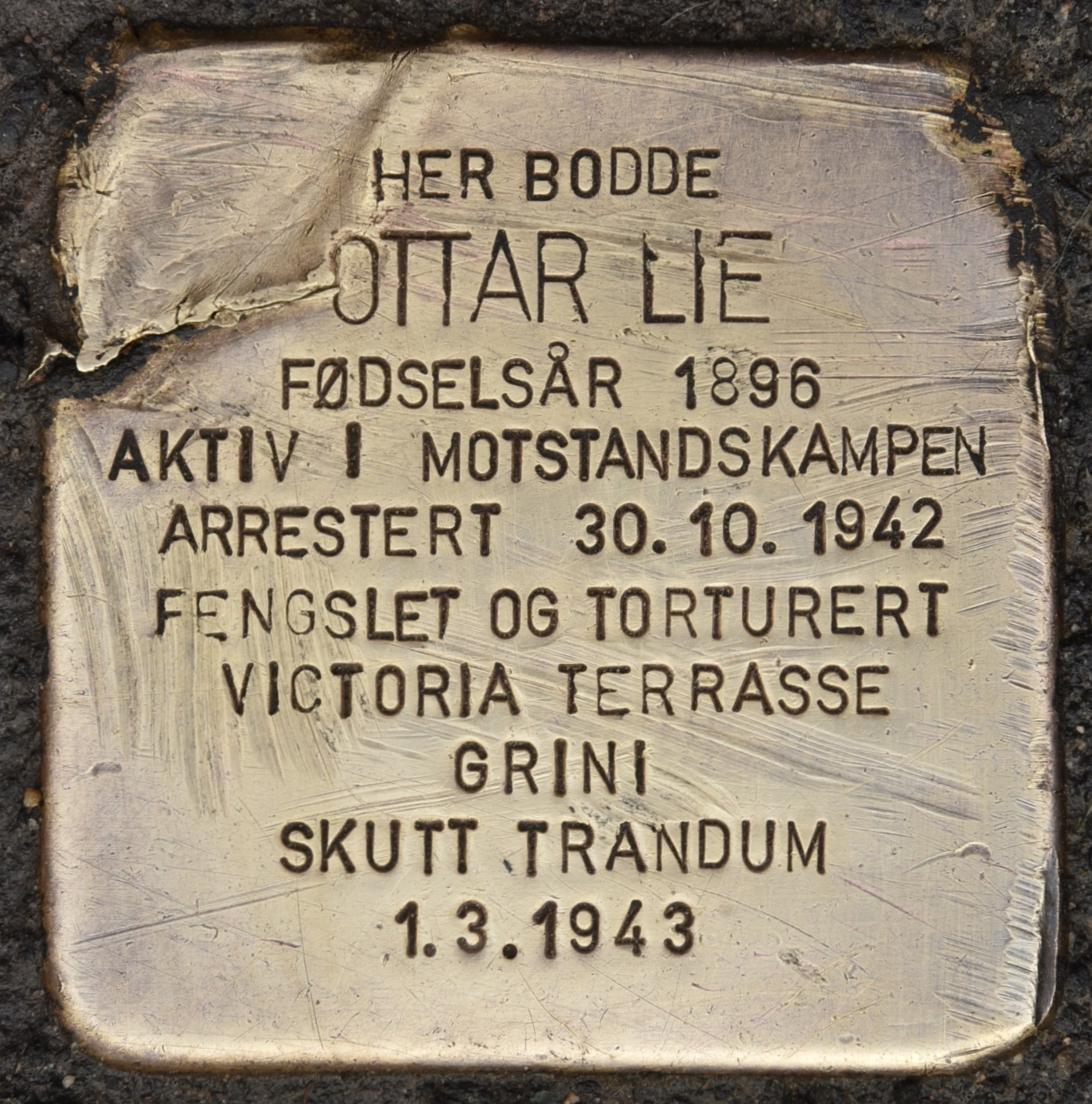
Stolperstein in Oslo

Ottar Lie (5 March 1896 – 1 March 1943) was a Norwegian communist and resistance member.

He was born in Løten Municipality, to a father from Vang Municipality and a mother from Ås Municipality. He was married twice, last to Inga, née Knutsen. He had two children, and lived in Oslo.

He was originally a member of the Norwegian Labour Party. In 1921 he was hired as county secretary in Hedmark. At the time he was also active in the Young Communist League (until 1923 the Labour Party youth wing). In 1923, at the founding of the Communist Party, Lie became Hedmark's representative in the central board. He continued as party secretary in Hedmark until 1927, then in Oslo for the party nationwide. Before it was stopped in 1940, Lie was also a board member of the newspaper Arbeideren.

He was a member of the Communist resistance movement, as Norway was occupied by Nazi Germany from 1940. In the now-illegal Communist Party he was one of the leading figures together with Henry W. Kristiansen, Just Lippe, Johan Strand Johansen and Emil Løvlien. He was held imprisoned in Møllergata 19 from August to September 1940. Eventually, together with Arne Gauslaa he led the party's organizational centre which had contact with communist resistance members who hid in the mountains. The centre was moved from Steinsfjorden to Vikersund in October 1942. The centre was blown after former resistance member Karsten Sølvberg had cracked during Gestapo torture, become a Gestapo agent and ratted them out. Already on 30 October 1942 the centre in Vikersund was surrounded by Gestapists. Gauslaa and another person were shot to death. Lie was arrested and tortured. He was held at Møllergata 19 from 30 October 1942, then in Grini detention camp from 24 February 1943. He was transferred to Trandum on 1 March 1943 and executed at Trandumskogen. He was buried in Oslo.

His brother Ivar Lie was also a communist resistance member, who managed to flee to Sweden.
