= Harald Slåttelid =

Norwegian politician (1895–1943)

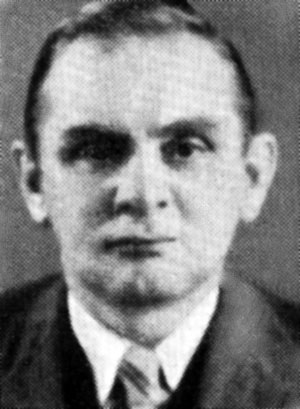
Harald Slåttelid

Harald Andreas Gerotti Slåttelid (20 January 1895 – 1 March 1943) was a Norwegian trade unionist, newspaper editor, and communist resistance member.

He was born in Os Municipality, to a father from Volda and a mother from Fana. He worked in Odda, and married Sigrid Johansen from Kristiania here in 1918. They had three children.

He was a member of the Norwegian Labour Party from 1909, and was organized in a union from 1911. He had a modest technical education. He chaired the local trade union from 1922, and was a board member of the Norwegian Union of Electricians from 1922 to 1923. From 1923 to 1930 he was a member of the supervisory council of the Norwegian Confederation of Trade Unions. He was a member of the executive committee of the municipal council of Odda Municipality for many years.

In 1923 he joined the Communist Party. He edited the newspaper Hardanger Arbeiderblad, and chaired the Communist Party in Odda from 1926. He continued his work for the Communist Party during the occupation of Norway by Nazi Germany, when the party was illegal. He was arrested by the Nazis on 26 May 1942, and imprisoned in Møllergata 19 and Grini detention camp. At his trial, on 27 February 19434, he was sentenced to death, and then placed in the death cell "Fallskjermen" at Grini.

On 1 March 1943 he was executed at Trandumskogen. A press release from 1 March, signed Der Höhere SS- und Polizeiführer Nord, SS-Obergruppenführer und General der Polizei Rediess and titled "Dødsdom over 17 nordmenn" appeared in the newspapers. Seventeen persons had been sentenced to death and executed, and Slåttelid's name was included on the list. In 1945 a total of 194 bodies were found in mass graves in the woods of Trandum, 173 Norwegians, six British and fifteen Soviet citizens.

His son Ørnulf (sometimes given as Ørnulv) Slåttelid, born 1919, became the illegal leader of the Young Communist League after Arne Gauslaa in 1942. He was arrested by the Nazis in the same year, and committed suicide in prison.
