= Oscar Hans =

German war criminal (born 1910)

Oscar Hans (born 6 February 1910, date of death unknown) was a German war criminal, leader of a SS-Sonderkommando during the occupation of Norway. He was born in Volmeringen, Lorraine, German Empire.

Hans led the execution of more than 300 persons during the war years, including 195 persons executed at Trandumskogen in Ullensaker. His first job was the executions of Viggo Hansteen and Rolf Wickstrøm in September 1941, following a court-martial after the milk strike in Oslo. After the war he was initially sentenced to death, but he successfully appealed his sentence. The Supreme Court of Norway concluded that he could not have known he was acting in violation of certain treaties. The Supreme Court also expelled him from Norway, and he was later His tried by a British military court in Hamburg for the execution of six British prisoners of war. The trial held on 18–22 August 1948. Hans was sentenced to death, but then had his sentence commuted to 15 years. He was released in April 1954.
