= Selma Lønning Aarø =

Norwegian writer

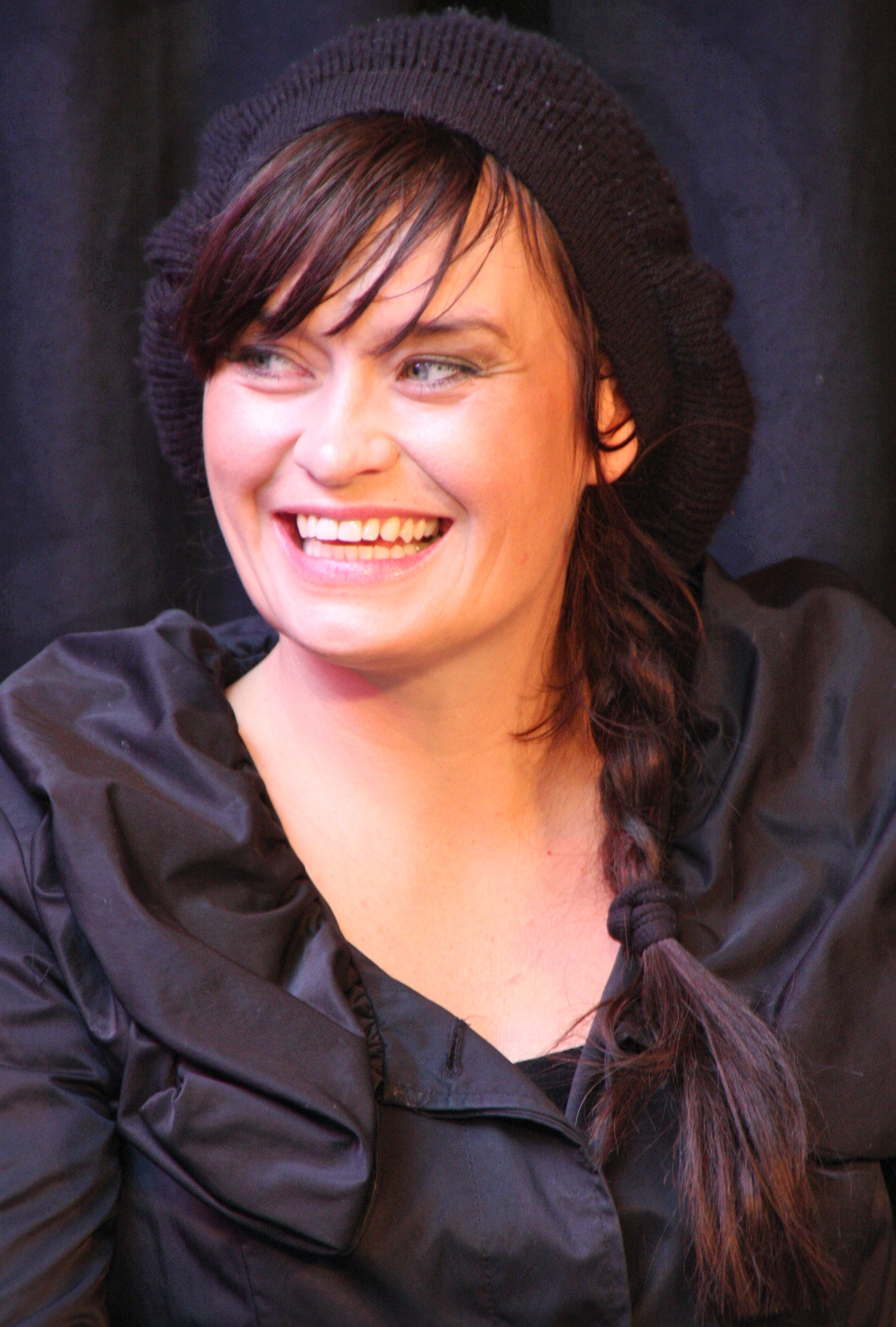
- Born: 13 July 1972 (age 53)
- Occupations: Novelist, humorist, children's writer and columnist

Selma Lønning Aarø (born 13 July 1972) is a Norwegian novelist, humorist, children's writer and columnist.

She made her literary debut in 1995 with the novel Den endelige historien, about the erotic adventures of a young woman. The novel won a prize for best debut novel from the publishing house J.W. Cappelens Forlag. Later novels are Spekulum from 1996, and Bebudelse from 1999. The novel Vill ni åka mera? from 2003 was nominated for the Brage Prize. She published the humour book Scener fra et ekteskap in 2003, and Stormfulle høyder in 2005. She wrote the Vekevis in 2010, an easy-to-read novel for adults. In 2012 she issued the children's book Vampyrlus!, and in 2016 the novel Hennes løgnaktige ytre. She has edited three editions of the debutant anthology series Signaler, jointly with Nils-Øivind Haagensen.

Aarø has been a newspaper columnist for several years, for Dagbladet and Klassekampen.
