= Bjarne Dalland =

Norwegian trade unionist and politician (1906-1943)

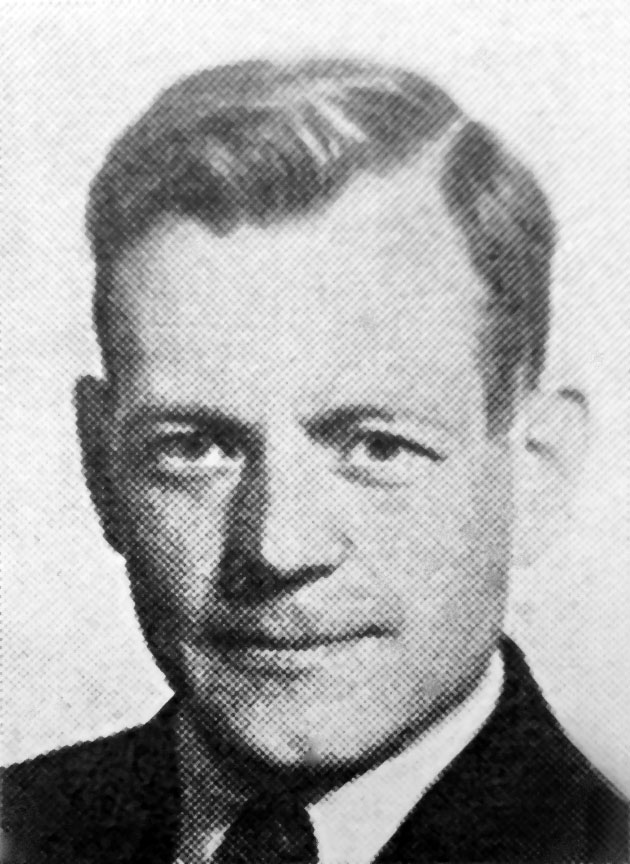
Bjarne Dalland

Bjarne Dalland (27 August 1906 – 1 March 1943) was a Norwegian trade unionist, politician and communist resistance member.

== Biography ==
Dalland was born in Bergen as the son of Christoffer Dalland from Manger Municipality and Ingeborg Tvedt from Meland Municipality. He married Birgith Hansen from Bergen in 1933. They had two children. His brother Randulf Dalland was a member of the Parliament of Norway from 1945. His brother Thorvald Einar Dalland, born 1908, perished with the ship Blia while trying to escape to the United Kingdom in 1941.

From 1929 to 1930 he led the Young Communist League of Norway. He was a dock worker in Bergen, a steward of the local trade union, and a member of the central committee of the Communist Party. During the occupation of Norway by Nazi Germany, he was in charge of organizing the illegal activities of the Communist Party in Western Norway. He was arrested by the Nazis in 1940, and imprisoned for six months at the Ulven concentration camp. He was arrested for the second time on 8 September 1942, and imprisoned in the Grini detention camp and Møllergata 19. At trial on 27 February 1944, He and eight other prisoners from Odda were sentenced to death. At the same trial his brother Hans was sentenced to ten years imprisonment in Germany.

On 1 March 1943 he was executed at Trandumskogen. A press release signed by Der Höhere SS- und Polizeiführer Nord, SS-Obergruppenführer und General der Polizei Rediess, titled "Dødsdom over 17 nordmenn", appeared in Norwegian newspapers. Dalland's name was included on the list among seventeen persons who had been sentenced to death and executed. He was found in a mass grave at Trandum after the war, and buried at the Møllendal cemetery in Bergen. A total of 194 bodies were found in mass graves in the woods of Trandum, 173 Norwegians, six British and fifteen Soviet citizens.

Party political offices
Preceded by	Chairman of the Young Communist League of Norway; 1929–1930	Succeeded by Leonard Schrøder Evensen
