= Arne Laudal =

Norwegian resistance fighter

Arne Laudal (25 September 1892 – 9 May 1944) was a Norwegian military officer, Milorg pioneer and resistance fighter during World War II. He was arrested by the Germans, sentenced to death and executed.

== Early life and career ==
Born in Holme Municipality in Lister og Mandal county, Arne Laudal was the son of Bent Løvdal and his wife Ragnhild. He finished his secondary education at Kristiansand Cathedral School in 1916, and attended the Norwegian Military Academy (Norwegian: Krigsskolen), graduating in 1918. He married teacher Helga Stray in 1925. In 1930 he received the rank of captain, and headed a school for non-commissioned officers for nine years. He was appointed chief of staff with colonel Otto Ruge in 1939. He was given the rank of Major in January 1940.

== World War II ==
During the Norwegian Campaign Laudal was chief of staff under colonel Otto Ruge. He was involved in the battle of Midtskogen, and was later in command of military forces in Østerdalen, Valdres and Northern Norway. He was among the pioneer leaders of the undercover military organisation Milorg, building up the Southern Norway district (labeled D 18, covering the Agder counties). He was arrested by the Germans in December 1942, tortured at Arkivet in Kristiansand, transferred to the Grini detention camp, sentenced to death and shot at Trandumskogen in May 1944.

The crackdown of the Milorg district in Southern Norway by Gestapo in December 1942 led to the death of more than fifty men. Semb-Johansson estimates that 324 persons were arrested. Six of these were executed, including Laudal, while seventy died during imprisonment or shortly after the war.

He was posthumously awarded the British King's Commendation for Brave Conduct. A bust of Laudal was unveiled in Kristiansand in 1969.
