= Trandumskogen =

Forest and Nazi mass grave site in Norway

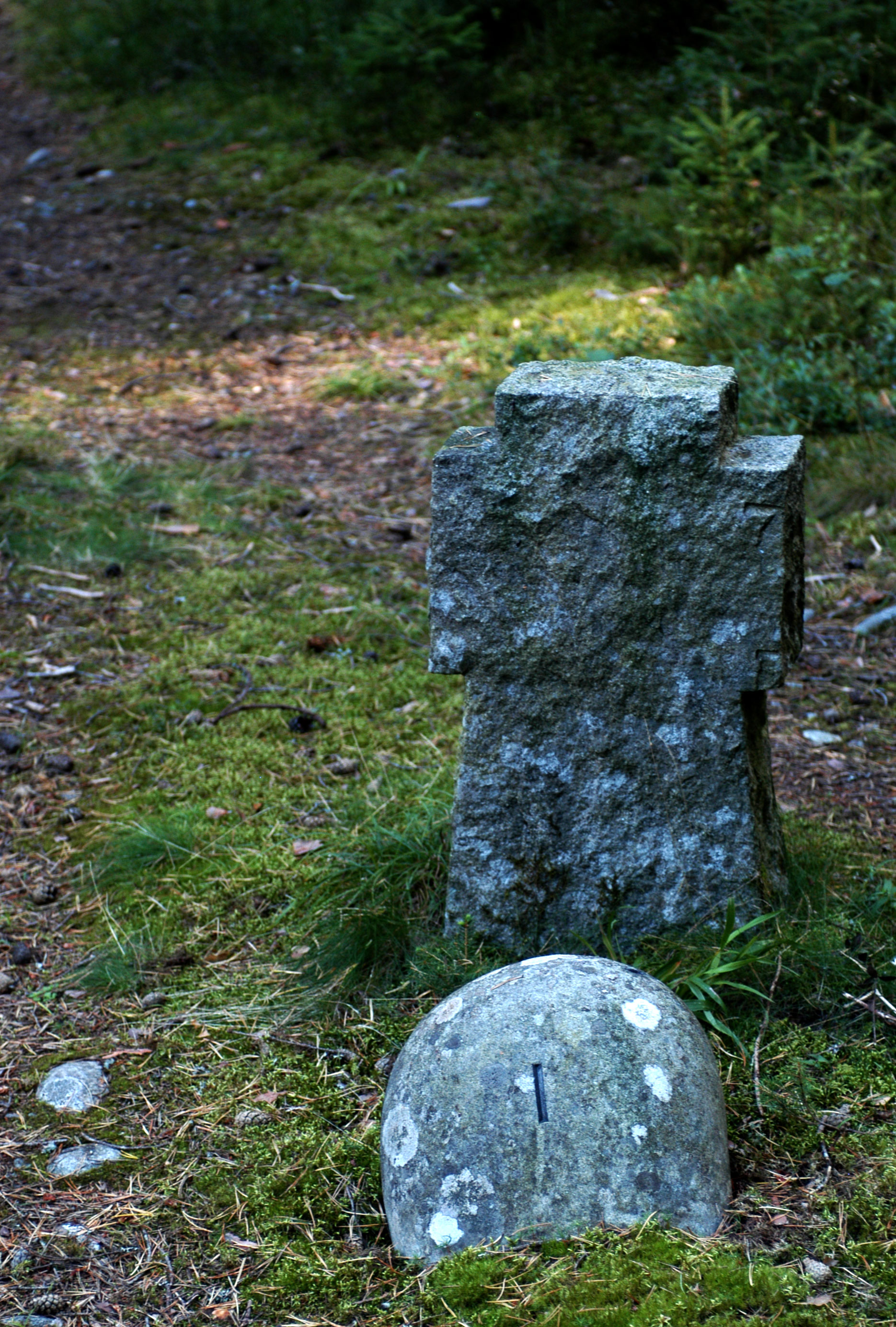
Grave at Trandumskogen

Trandumskogen is a forest located in Ullensaker, Akershus county, Norway. It was the site of one of the first discoveries in May 1945 of German mass graves in Norway. The German executioner Oscar Hans was the officer in command of the unit performing the executions.

In total 173 Norwegians, 6 British and 15 Soviet citizens were executed in Trandumskogen. Many had been sentenced to death by the German occupation forces, but there was also a great number who were subject to arbitrary executions. Most were resistance fighters, while the Russians were prisoners in German prison camps who had tried to escape. Five of the Britons had been arrested for planning to blow up the heavy water plant at Vemork, and the sixth Briton was involved in a sabotage attempt on the battleship Tirpitz. After the Second World War, Norwegian citizens sentenced for treason, and leading members of the Norwegian national socialist party Nasjonal Samling were forced to open the graves and exhume the bodies of the executed prisoners. The medical identification of the corps was led by professor in forensic medicine Georg Waaler, assisted by dentist Ferdinand Strøm.

From May 5, 2020, Trandumskogen is protected as a national cultural heritage site. Harald V held a speech at Trandumskogen on the 80th anniversary of Victory in Europe Day.

== Memorial ==
Per Palle Storm, artist and sculptor and professor at the National Art Academy had carried out the artistic part of the work. The memorial is carved of light Granite (Iddefjordgranitt). The memorial is located south of the burial ground. The memorial lists the names of those who were executed there.

The text on the memorial reads:

IN THE COMBAT FOR FREEDOM
DURING THE 1940-1945 WAR
173 NORWEGIANS 15 SOVJET-
SUBJECTS AND 6 BRITONS WERE
HERE IN THE WOODS OF TRAN-
DUM EXECUTED BY THE ENEMY

== The names of those executed at Trandumskogen ==
=== Grave 1, 1 March 1943 ===
- Arthur Oskar Berg from Odda
- Bjarne Dalland from Bergen
- Daniel Theodor Danielsen from Voss
- Thor Gerotti Espelid from Odda
- Ole Kjell Karlsen from Oslo
- Leif Arnoldus Kindem from Odda
- Ingolf Kleppestø from Odda
- Olav Kvernmo from Oslo
- Ottar Lie from Oslo
- Gustav Adolf Neråsen from Øyer
- Lars Nordbø from Oslo
- Olaf Prestegaard from Odda
- Harald Andreas Gerotti Slåttelid from Odda
- Arne Stensrud from Oslo
- Reidar Svendsen from Oslo
- Sigurd Syvertsen from Krokstadelva
- Knut Veka from Odda

=== Grave 2, 3 September 1943 ===
- Marius Nikolai Karlsen from Skjervøy
- Hillfl David Lie from Oslo
- Karsten Løvestad from Trøgstad

=== Grave 3, 30 October 1944 ===
- Nicolai Bachilin from the Soviet Union
- Jacob Brunelin from the Soviet Union
- Jacob Magnus Frøyland from Farsund
- Fedor Getnikow from the Soviet Union
- Eyolf Haug from Kongsberg
- Odd Trygve Christiansen from Fagernes
- Audun Lavik from Lyngdal
- Michael Lotikow from the Soviet Union
- Vladimir Medownikow from the Soviet Union
- Sverre Emil Narvesen from Modum
- Thormod Johannes Nygaard from Oslo
- Gunnar Onshuus from Sandefjord
- Simon Peachawow from the Soviet Union
- Rolf Edvin Pettersen from Drammen
- Borti Reichelt from Kragerø
- Boris Resnick from the Soviet Union
- Hugo Rossnes from Oslo
- Reidar Steen Olsen from Sandefjord
- Olaf Strand from Bergen
- Per Rolf Syvertsen
- Karl Ludvig Sørensen from Sandefjord
- Patike Tschikidse from the Soviet Union

=== Grave 4, 30 April 1942 ===
- Leif Bye Nielsen from Oslo
- Arne Grønn Disch from Tønsberg
- Ole Elias Dyrøy from Borgund
- Harald Bølerud from Oslo
- Per Andreas Fillinger from Oslo
- Jakob Otto Friis from Oslo
- Andreas Gjertsen from Oslo
- Leonard Godager from Furnes
- Ole Kjeldserg from Nordstrand
- Alfred Waldemar Garmann Larsen from Oslo
- Ole Arntzen Lutzow Holm from Oslo
- Einar Oliver Mjølhus from Hjelmland
- Jesper Kjell Næss from Odal
- Bjarne Fillip Olsen from Ålesund
- Magnus Tuntland from Hjelmland
- Peter Kristian Boe Young from Oslo
- Birger Aasland from Hjelmland
- Kåre Angell Elgenes from Molde (executed 1 May)

=== Grave 6, 5 September 1944 ===
- Kristian Andresen from Gjøvik
- Fedor Barkow from the Soviet Union
- Finn Brede Bråthen from Modum
- Peter Christensen from Oslo
- Arne Reidar Gustavsen from Drammen
- Reinhard Halvorsen from Norderhov
- Petter Albert Hammerø from Oslo
- Reidar Hansen from Norderhov
- Åge Hansen from Oslo
- Daniel Jacowitz from the Soviet Union
- Ove Jensen from Asker
- Georg Johannes Jenserud from Norderhov
- Martin Kleppan from Oslo
- Johan Karelius Moen from Norderhov
- Helge Olsen from Norderhov
- Kåre Pettersen from Drammen
- Stephan Pleschatschew from the Soviet Union
- Wasil Sacharschenko from the Soviet Union
- Gunnar K Skinstad from Modum
- Gjermund Karl Skaarud from Oslo
- Per Thore Stensrud from Oslo
- Alexander Szeinzuk from the Soviet Union
- Benani Tschikikow from the Soviet Union

=== Grave 7, 3 June 1944 ===
- Gunnar Hanssen from Oslo
- Kaare Hexeberg from Nittedal
- Oskar Haakon Johannessen from Nittedal
- Per Grell Lønning from Oslo
- Odd Næss from Oslo

=== Grave 8, 25/26 May 1944 ===
==== 25 May 1944 ====
- Hans Skjærvø from Osen
- Georg Stokke from Oslo

==== 26 May 1944 ====
- Thore Eugen Sentzen from Svanvik in Sør-Varanger
- Magnus Dahlen from Fåberg
- Lars Emil Erichsen from Oslo
- John Hatland from Oslo
- Frederik Wilhelm Holter from Oslo
- Odvar Jacobsen from Oslo
- Leif Richard Johansen from Oslo
- Harald Reitan from Oslo
- Per Arne Stranger Thorsen from Oslo
- Sven Olav Vogt from Oslo

=== Grave 9, Unknown date ===
- F. Bonner from the United Kingdom
- J. N. Blackburn from the United Kingdom
- R. P. Evans from the United Kingdom
- W. Jackson from the United Kingdom
- J. Walsh from the United Kingdom
- T. W. White from the United Kingdom

=== Grave 10, 2/3 March 1943 ===
==== 2. March 1943 ====
- Johan Peter Bruun from Oslo
- Haakon Marius Sunde from Kopervik

==== 3 March 1943 ====
- Ragnar Alf Anderson from Nesodden
- Osmund Lindgård Brønnum from Oslo
- Arne Gunnestad from Asker
- Kaare Bjørn Jensen from Oslo
- Thorleif Krogh from Oslo
- Jacob Dybcad Sømme from Oslo
- Lorentz Helge Aarnes from Oslo

=== Grave 11, 13/14 October ===
==== 13 October 1943 ====
- Anders Johansen Krok from Mjøndalen
- Erling Christian Marthinson from Eidsvåg i Åsane

==== 14 October 1943 ====
- Thomas Henry Thornau Agnæs from Drammen
- Sverre Andersen from Oslo
- Reidar Furu from Drammen
- Aksel Eugen Grønholdt from Oslo
- Kaare Gundersen from Oslo
- Sverre Emil Halvorsen from Oslo
- Sigurd Jacobsen from Oslo
- Alv Johan Johnsen from Drammen
- Arthur Simensen from Nedre Eiker
- Emil Gustav Hvaal from Sem
- Lars Elias Telle from Sund
- Olaf Østerud from Oslo
- Christian Fredrik Fasting Aall from Fana

=== Grave 12, 21 May 1943 ===
- Anton Bø from Nærbø
- Olaf Ege from Vigrestad
- Karl Hellestø from Sola
- Jørstein Johannesen from Time
- Magnus Mæland from Mæland
- Martin Opstad from Bø
- Ingvar Ree from Nærbø
- Ole Rosland from Time
- Torgeir Sikvaland from Time
- Augustus Stensland from Time
- Andreas Steinsland from Time
- Ragnvald Torland from Torland
- Trygve Varden from Vigrestad
- Arne Vigre from Nærbø
- Sverre Valdeland from Valdeland

=== Grave 13, 4 July 1944 ===
- Ovin Christoffer Bronsta from Drammen
- Jan Segelcke Koren from Oslo
- Gay Børre Kristiansen from Kristiansand
- Alf Leonard Lande from Nøtterøy
- Per Nannestad Lindaas from Oslo
- Tomas Per Trægde from Drammen
- Olav Josef Wetterstad from Kongsberg

=== Grave 14, 7 September 1942 ===
- Haakon Eriksen from Oslo
- Bjarne Hansen from Nedre Eiker
- Eli(as) Skjold Hansen from Oslo
- Karl Johan Jacobsen from Oslo
- Alf Kristiansen from Drammen
- Reidar Kristoffersen from Krokstadelva
- Karl Frithjof Schei from Nes på Romerike

=== Grave 15, 12 August 1942 ===
- Poul Kvamme from Bergen
- Unknown from the Soviet Union

=== Grave 16, 28 June 1943 ===
- Ragnar Fredriksen from Kristiansand
- Erling Karlsen from Oddernes

=== Grave 17, 9/10 May 1944 ===
==== 9. May 1944 ====
- Arnt Andersen from Stavanger
- Arne Thurin Bjørge from Arendal
- Leif Dahl from Slagen
- Olav Dyvik from Grimstad
- Arthur Valdemar Emanuelsen from Stavanger
- Johan Alfred Gøranson from Oppegård
- Knut Haugneland from Stavanger
- Martin August Johannesen from Egersund
- Henry Victor Larsen from Stavanger
- Arne Laudal from Kristiansand
- Georg Osnes from Stavanger
- Rolf Olav Schulstad from Oslo

==== 10 May 1944 ====
- Knut Bø from Bygland
- Magnus Nielsen from Hetland
- Ingvald Georg Nordbø from Stavanger
- Lars Sandvik from Kvinneherad
- Torleif Tellefsen from Grimstad
- Ferdinand Tjemsland from Stavanger
- Aanund Tveit from Vestre Moland

=== Grave 18, Flatnermoen, 29 December 1941 ===
- Borgen Bøe from Stavanger
- Karluf John Hans Bø from Stavanger
- Georg Fjeldberg from Hjelmeland
- Thomas Fjermstad from Stavanger
- Georg Helland from Stavanger
- Einar Hoseth from Stavanger
- Martin Jacobsen from Stavanger
- John Nilsen from Hetland
- Carl Johan Oftedahl from Stavanger
- Olav Ragnvald Olsson from Hetland
- Arnt Plesner-Pedersen from Stavanger

== 2021 investigation of agency's tree-cutting at the heritage site ==
In May 2021, Forsvarsbygg cut down the trees in the forest causing widespread condemnation. This action resulted in a criminal complaint which is as of June 2021, still under investigation.

In 2021, Forsvarsbygg cut down trees in the forest. On 2 June the county of Viken ordered that the cutting must stop; the mayor of Ullensaker filed a police report. The Cabinet ordered a fact-finding commission regarding what had happened and how to prevent similar events at similar sites, according to the minister of defence.

As of June 2021, the tree-cutting at the heritage site is still under investigation.
