= Lars Lervik =

Norwegian military officer (born 1971)

Major-General Lars Sivert Lervik
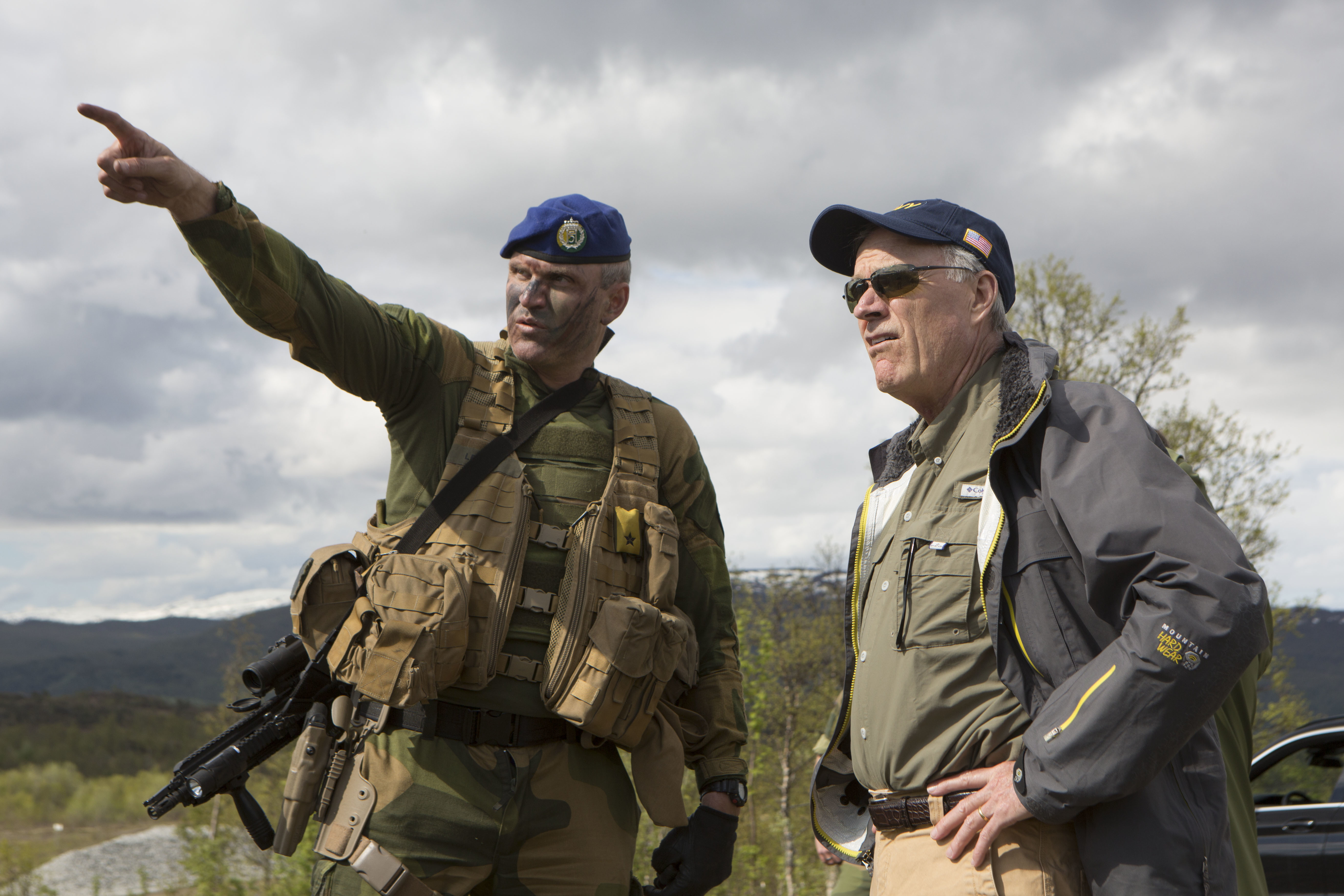
- Lervik (left) speaking to Richard V. Spencer during an exercise in June 2019
- Born: 12 July 1971 (age 55); Øksendal, Møre og Romsdal, Norway
- Allegiance: Norway
- Service: Norwegian Army
- Rank: Major general

Major-General Lars Sivert Lervik (born 12 July 1971) is a Norwegian army officer who became Chief of the Norwegian Army on 25 June 2020.

== Early life ==
Lars Sivert Lervik was born on 12 July 1971 in Øksendal, Møre og Romsdal.

== Military service and education ==
Lervik joined the Norwegian Army on 3 July 1990.

He attended the Officers School for the Cavalry at Trandum leir from 1990 to 1991 and the Norwegian Military Academy from 1992 to 1995.

After attending the Officers School for the Cavalry, Lervik joined the Armoured Battalion as a vehicle commander.

In 2003, Lervik completed the Armor Captain Career Course at Fort Knox in Kentucky.

Lervik studied at the Advanced Command and Staff College in Shrivenham, England from 2006 to 2007.

In 2015, Lervik was awarded the Defence Service Medal.

From 2016 to 2017, Lervik attended the United States Army War College in Carlisle, Pennsylvania.

=== Chief of the Army ===
Lervik was promoted to major-general and made Chief of the Army on 25 June 2020, succeeding Major-General Eirik Kristoffersen.

In January 2021, Lervik expressed his support for winter NATO exercises in Norway during the COVID-19 pandemic, arguing that it is an important part of Norwegian security that the alliance is able to operate under the conditions in Norway.

On 27 April 2023, Maj. Gen. Lervik was inducted as the 78th member of the U.S. Army War College, International Fellows Hall of Fame.
