= Karsten Sølvberg =

Norwegian resistance member

Karsten Ludvig Sølvberg (19 January 1905 – 1976) was a Norwegian communist, trade unionist and agent during the Second World War.

Before the Second World War he was a trade unionist and member of the Communist Party. He was a telegraph clerk by occupation. His union was Norsk Telegrafforbund, and he edited the union's magazine Telegrafmannen.

During the occupation of Norway by Nazi Germany, the Nazis merged his union with others to form the Forbundet for Offentlige Yrker. Sølvberg was a union secretary. He was initially a member of the resistance movement, and was arrested in October 1942 by account of "illegal activity". He was incarcerated at Møllergata 19 from 27 October 42, and also at Victoria Terrasse. He was released on 16 April 1943. He had then been subject to torture. He was pressured to denounce his communist adherence, and to become a Nazi agent with the codename S 71. He is best known for unveiling the Communist Party organizational centres in 1942, which had been established in secrecy in Vikersund and Hemsedal. Sølvberg supposedly escorted Gestapo officers to both hideouts. The underground Communist Party leaders Arne Gauslaa and Ottar Lie were surprised there; Gauslaa and another person were shot to death while Lie was arrested and tortured. His agent practice was unveiled when Georg Angerer defected to Sweden.

After the war Sølvberg was not reinstated in his job, nor in his trade union post. He was however acquitted of treason by Oslo City Court in 1949, when tried as a part of legal purge in Norway after World War II.
