= Arne Gauslaa =

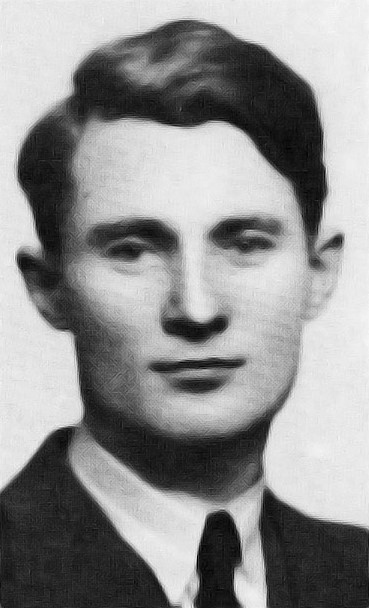
Arne Gauslaa

Arne Gauslaa (8 February 1913 – 30 October 1942) was a Norwegian communist, newspaper editor and resistance member.

== Biography ==
He was born in Solum Municipality, to a mother from Solum and a father from Herefoss. His father Olav Gauslaa was a member of the municipal council of Solum Municipality from 1910 to 1927 and again from 1931, and had joined the Communist Party in 1923. Arne Gauslaa married Audhild Olsen from Skien in 1932, and had one foster child. The family lived in Oslo.

In 1931 Gauslaa was sentenced in court twice. The first time he was sentenced to prison for participating in the Skirmish of Menstad, then for making the small newspaper Den røde elev at his school. He took modest education, and was the chairman of Young Communist League of Norway from 1934 to 1942. He also edited the newspaper Klassekampen. From 1940 his work was underground in the resistance movement, as Norway was occupied by Nazi Germany. Eventually, together with Ottar Lie he led the party's organizational centre which had contact with communist resistance members who hid in the mountains. The centre was moved from Steinsfjorden to Vikersund in October 1942. They were blown after former resistance member Karsten Sølvberg had cracked during Gestapo torture, become a Gestapo agent and informed on them. On 30 October 1942 the centre was surrounded by Gestapo agents. There was a shootout, in which two Germans and two Norwegian communists including Gauslaa were killed. He was buried in Oslo.

Party political offices
Preceded by Leonard Schrøder Evensen	Chairman of the Young Communist League of Norway; 1934–1942	Succeeded by vacant
