= Hardanger Arbeiderblad =

Norwegian newspaper

Hardanger Arbeiderblad was a Norwegian newspaper, published in Odda in Vestland county.

Hardanger Arbeiderblad was started in 1919 as Hardanger Social-Demokrat. Its name was changed in 1923, the same year as a faction of the Labour Party left social democracy to form the Communist Party of Norway. It was published once a week, but from mid-1927 twice a week. It was closed after its last issue on 14 August 1940 due to the German occupation of Norway. It returned in 1946, as a common project for the Labour and Communist parties, but went defunct in 1949. In the general election the same year the Communist Party had dropped from 11 to 0 seats in Parliament.

The first editor was Edvard Jørstad. Among the later editors was Harald Slåttelid.
