= Trandum leir =

Coordinates: 60°12′37″N 11°07′37″E

- Former army camp
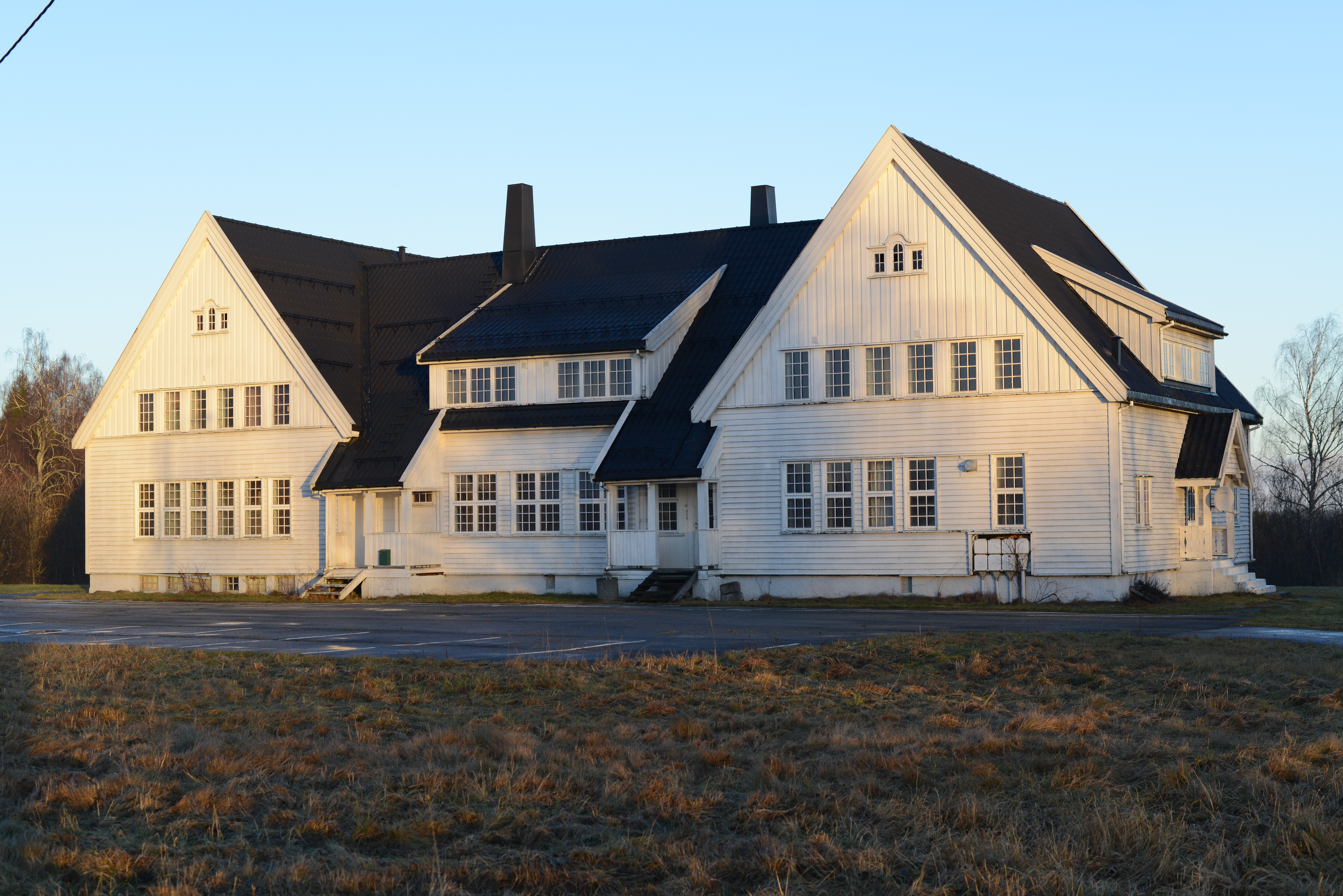
- Building at Trandum camp
- Interactive map of Trandum leir
- Country: Norway
- Region: Østlandet
- County: Akershus
- Time zone: UTC+01:00 (CET)
  - Summer (DST): UTC+02:00 (CEST)

Trandum leir is a former army camp Ullensaker, Norway. The camp was shut down when the civilian airport at Gardermoen was built since most of the buildings were located directly underneath the flightpath for planes landing there.

The woods near Trandum were an infamous site of execution of political prisoners during the Occupation of Norway by Nazi Germany. In 1945 a total of 194 bodies were found in mass graves in the woods of Trandum, including 173 Norwegians, six British and fifteen Soviet citizens. Those who could be identified were exhumed and placed in individual graves (see Bjarne Dalland).
