= Tom Strømstad Olsen =

Norwegian politician

Tom Strømstad Olsen (born 12 September 1971) is a Norwegian politician for the Labour Party.

== Biography ==
He served as a deputy representative to the Norwegian Parliament from Vestfold during the term 2005–2009.

On the local level he is a member of Tønsberg municipal council.
