= Marița =

Marița may refer to several entities in Romania:

- Marița (river), a tributary of the Cerna in Vâlcea County
- Marița, a village in Călinești Commune, Teleorman County
- Marița, a village in Vaideeni Commune, Vâlcea County
