= Heidi Olufsen =

Norwegian diplomat

Heidi Olufsen (born 25 April 1971) is a Norwegian diplomat. Ambassador of Norway to Russia (since 2025).

== Biography ==
Olufsen holds a Master of Science in economics from the Norwegian School of Economics (1996) and a Master of Science in Russian Studies from the London School of Economics (1997). She has worked in the Foreign Service since 1999.

From 2013 to 2017, she served as Consul General in Saint Petersburg. From 2017 to 2025, she was Consul General in New York. Previously, she also worked in Georgia (in the OSCE mission), Azerbaijan, Bosnia and Herzegovina, and in the Norwegian Ministry of Foreign Affairs.

== Honours and decorations ==
- - Ribbon for Knight 1st Class, Royal Norwegian Order of Merit (2014)

Diplomatic posts
Preceded by Robert Kvile	Norwegian ambassador to Russia; 2025–	Incumbent
