= Ingvild Vaggen Malvik =

Norwegian politician

Ingvild Vaggen Malvik (born 3 April 1971 in Trondheim) is a Norwegian politician for the Socialist Left Party (SV). She was elected to the Norwegian Parliament from Sør-Trøndelag in 2001. She failed to get re-elected in 2005, but meets in the place of Øystein Djupedal, who was appointed to a government position.

== Parliamentary Presidium duties ==
- 2001–2005 secretary in the Lagting.

== Parliamentary Committee duties ==
- 2005–2009 member of the Standing Committee on Business and Industry.
- 2001–2005 member of the Standing Committee on Energy and the Environment.
- 2001–2005 deputy member of the Electoral Committee.
