= Johan Leonard Hagen =

Norwegian politician

Johan Leonard Hagen (1849 - ??) was a Norwegian politician for the Liberal Party.

He was elected to the Norwegian Parliament in 1892, representing the constituency of Tromsø Amt. He only served one term. He worked as a telegrapher.
