= Pia Wedege =

Norwegian luger

Personal information
- Born: 16 May 1971 (age 54) Oslo, Norway

Sport
- Sport: Luge

Pia Wedege (born 16 May 1971) is a Norwegian luger. She was born in Oslo, and represented the club Lillehammer Bob- og Akeklubb. She competed at the 1994 Winter Olympics in Lillehammer, where she placed 13th in singles.
