= Frida Melvær =

Norwegian politician

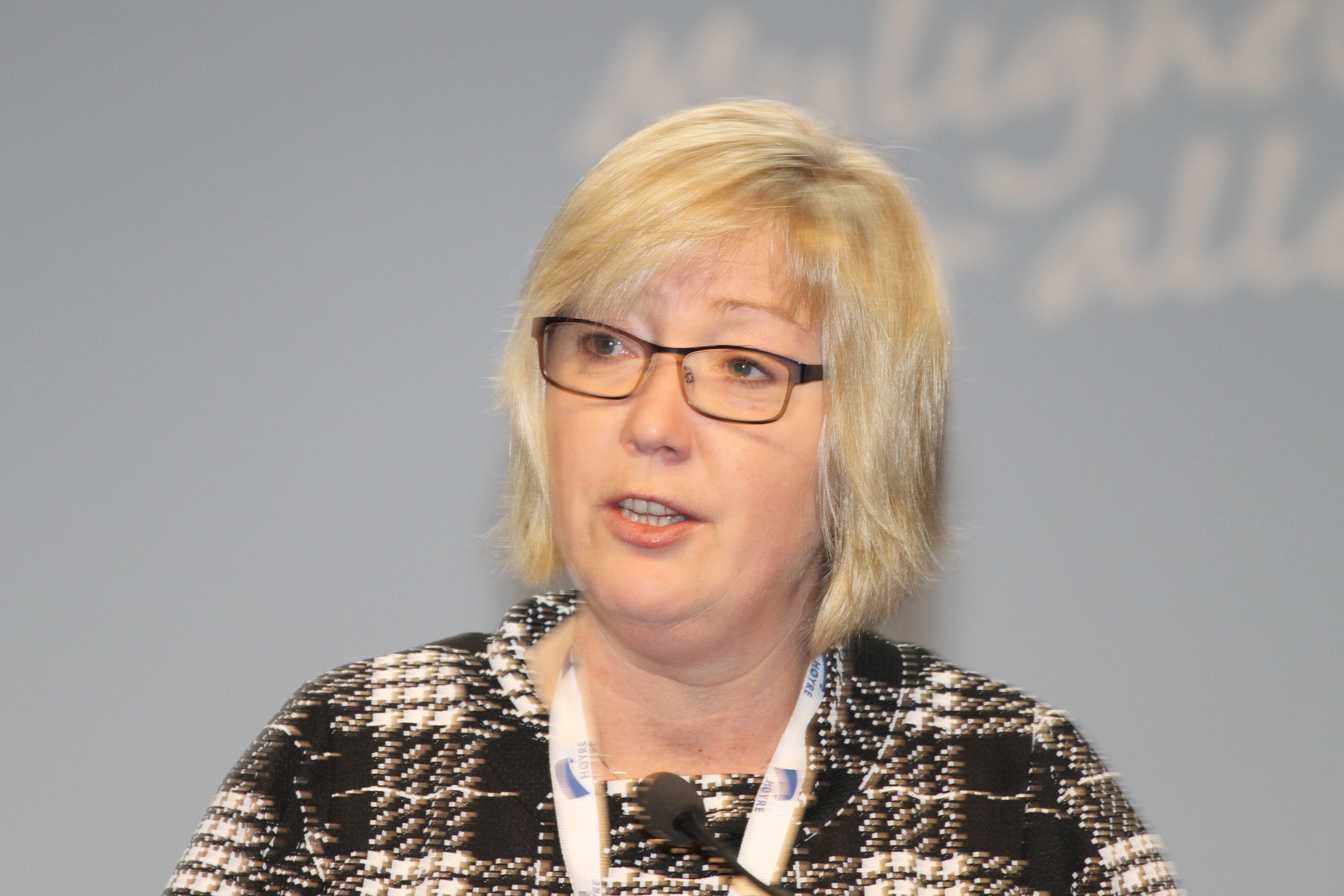
- Melvær in 2017
- Born: 29 September 1971 (age 54)
- Occupation: Politician

Frida Melvær (born 29 September 1971) is a Norwegian politician. She was elected representative to the Storting for the period 2017–2021 for the Conservative Party. In the Storting, she is a member of the Standing Committee on Justice.
