= Quinctia Marita =

1st-century Roman freedwoman

Quinctia Marita (fl. 1st century CE) was a Roman freedwoman from Caruntum. She is primarily known from an epitaph, which she had arranged in her will to have erected after death. She died at the age of 70. The epitaph inscription notes that she was a freedwoman of Publius, and that the epitaph itself was created by an Adauctus, a freedman.
