= Svein Haagensen =

Norwegian ice hockey player

Svein Johannes Haagensen (born 23 November 1939) is a Norwegian ice hockey player. He was born in Oslo and represented the club Hasle/Løren IL. He played for the Norwegian national ice hockey team, and participated at the Winter Olympics in 1968 and 1972.
