= Einar Østvedt =

Norwegian historian and educator

- Born: 30 November 1903; Skien, Telemark, Norway
- Died: 11 April 1980 (aged 76)
- Education: University of Oslo
- Alma mater: Harvard University
- Scientific career
- Fields: History and education
- Institutions: University of Besançon

Einar Østvedt (30 November 1903 – 11 April 1980) was a Norwegian historian and educator.

== Biography ==
Einar Østvedt was born in Skien in Telemark, Norway. During 1927-1928, he was resident student at the University of Besançon. He studied at the University of Oslo, graduating with his cand.philol. degree in 1930 and dr.philos. in 1946. He worked as a teacher in Skien from 1931 to 1971, except for a number of leaves. He studied in the United Kingdom in 1948, Harvard University in 1955, at Rome in 1963 and Copenhagen during 1964.

He published the book Telemark i norsk malerkunst in 1942, with illustrations by Harald Kihle. In 1946 he published his diaries from imprisonment during the occupation of Norway by Nazi Germany. His thesis from 1946 was a treatment on Christian Magnus Falsen. In 1963 he published a biography of Dyre Vaa, and also the book Fløtning i Telemark gjennom 300 år. He wrote several works on Henrik Ibsen, including twelve books. He was decorated Knight, First Class of the Order of St. Olav in 1978.

== Selected works ==
- Hermann Bagger som redaktør og politiker (1932)
- Straff og samhold. En dagbok fra lærernes Kirkenesferd (1942)
- Telemark i norsk malerkunst (1942)
- Frits Thaulow (1951)
- August Cappelens brev (1952)
- Henrik Ibsen og la bella Italia (1965)
- Henrik Ibsen og hans barndomsmiljø (1966)
- Telemark i norsk billedhuggerkunst (1967)
- Henrik Ibsen. Miljø og mennesker (1968)
- Peer Gynt. Mennesker og motiver (969)
- Mogens Heinessøn. Et Ibsen-skuespill som aldri ble skrevet (1969)
- Skien gymnas gjennom halvannet sekel (1972)
- Henrik Ibsen. Barndom og ungdom (1973)
- Henrik Ibsen og hans venner (1974)
- På gamle tufter. Ti Telemarksprofiler (1975)
- Et dukkehjem. Forspillet. Skuespillet. Etterspillet (1976)
- Den siste glede. Ni noveller (1979)
