= Ferdinand Strøm =

Norwegian dentist (1903–1990)

- Born: 10 June 1903; Kristiania, Norway
- Died: 29 November 1990 (aged 87)
- Occupation: Dentist
- Known for: Pioneer in developing forensic dentistry in Norway

Ferdinand Strøm (10 June 1903 – 29 November 1990) was a Norwegian dentist, and a pioneer in developing forensic dentistry in Norway. He was born in Kristiania to Ferdinand Gunerius Strøm and Gurine Halvorsen.
