= Christian Fredrik Sissenèr =

Norwegian real estate owner and politician

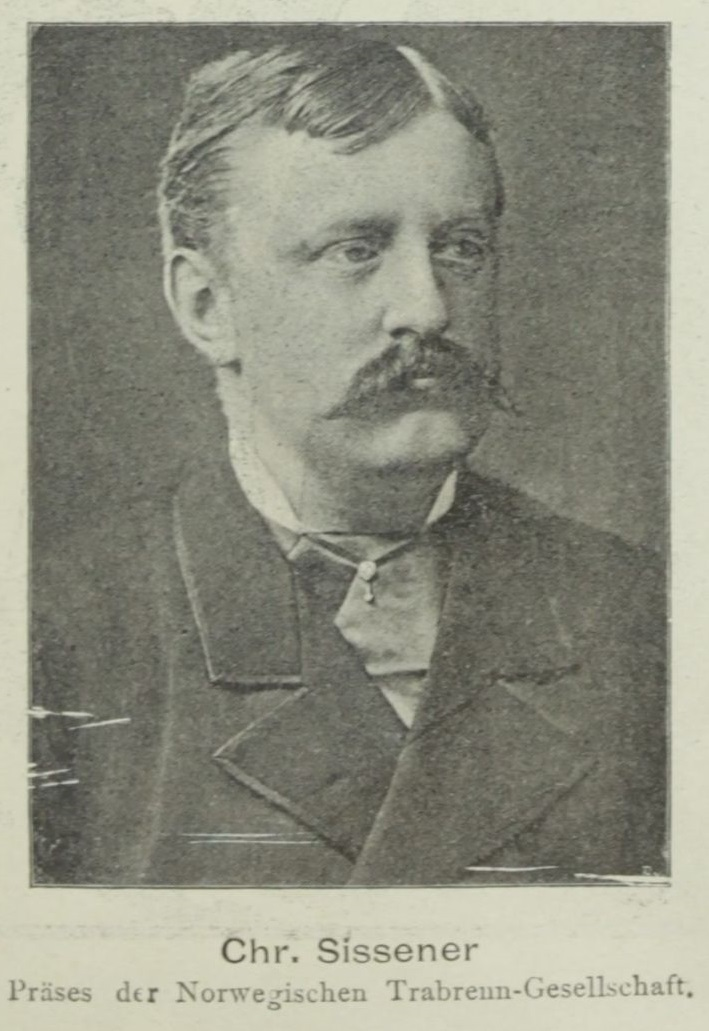
Christian Sissenèr

Christian Fredrik Møllerop Sissenèr (15 November 1849 – 4 January 1903) was a Norwegian real estate owner and politician for the Conservative Party.

Sissenèr was born in Trondhjem, and inherited his mother. From 1873 to 1874 he studied at the Norwegian College of Agriculture at Aas, and in 1874 he bought the manor Tomb in Råde.

He was elected to the Norwegian Parliament from Smaalenenes Amt in 1898, and sat through one term. He was later among the founders of Norsk Landmandsforbund, a forerunner of the Centre Party.
