= Nils-Øivind Haagensen =

Norwegian journalist, magazine editor, poet and publisher

Nils-Øivind Haagensen (born 29 July 1971) is a Norwegian journalist, magazine editor, poet and publisher. He was born in Ålesund. He made his literary debut in 1998 with the poetry collection Hender og hukommelse. In 2004 he was awarded the Sult-prisen. His poetry collection God morgen og god natt from 2012 was nominated for the Nordic Council's Literature Prize. He is founder and manager of the publishing house Flamme Forlag, jointly with Bendik Wold.

He has edited several editions of the debutant anthology series Signaler, jointly with Selma Lønning Aarø.
