= Svale Solheim =

Norwegian folklorist (1903–1971)

Svale Solheim (15 February 1903 – 20 December 1971) was a Norwegian folklorist. He was born in Naustdal Municipality. He graduated from the University of Oslo in 1934. He worked at the institution Norsk Folkeminnesamling from 1952 to 1956, and was appointed professor at the University of Oslo from 1956. Among his works are his doctor thesis Nemningsfordomar ved fiske from 1940, and Norsk sætertradisjon from 1952.
