= Hans Kristian Bromstad =

Norwegian politician

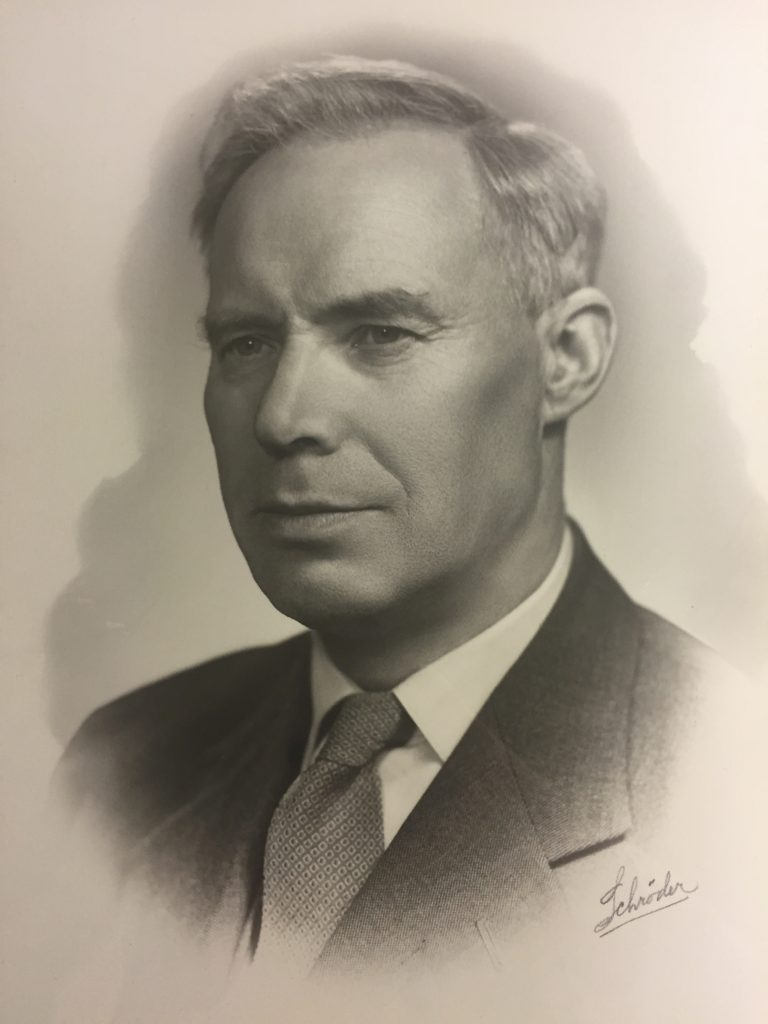
- Born: 28 March 1903; Skjørn Municipality
- Died: 19 July 1971 (aged 68)
- Occupation: Politician

Hans Kristian Bromstad (28 March 1903 in Skjørn Municipality – 19 July 1971) was a Norwegian politician for the Liberal Party.

He served as a deputy representative to the Norwegian Parliament from Sør-Trøndelag during the terms 1958–1961 and 1961–1965.

On the local level Bromstad was mayor of Stjørna Municipality from 1937 to 1955, except for the years 1940 to 1945 during the German occupation of Norway. Other than that he worked as a farmer.
