= Marita Liabø =

Norwegian writer (born 1971)

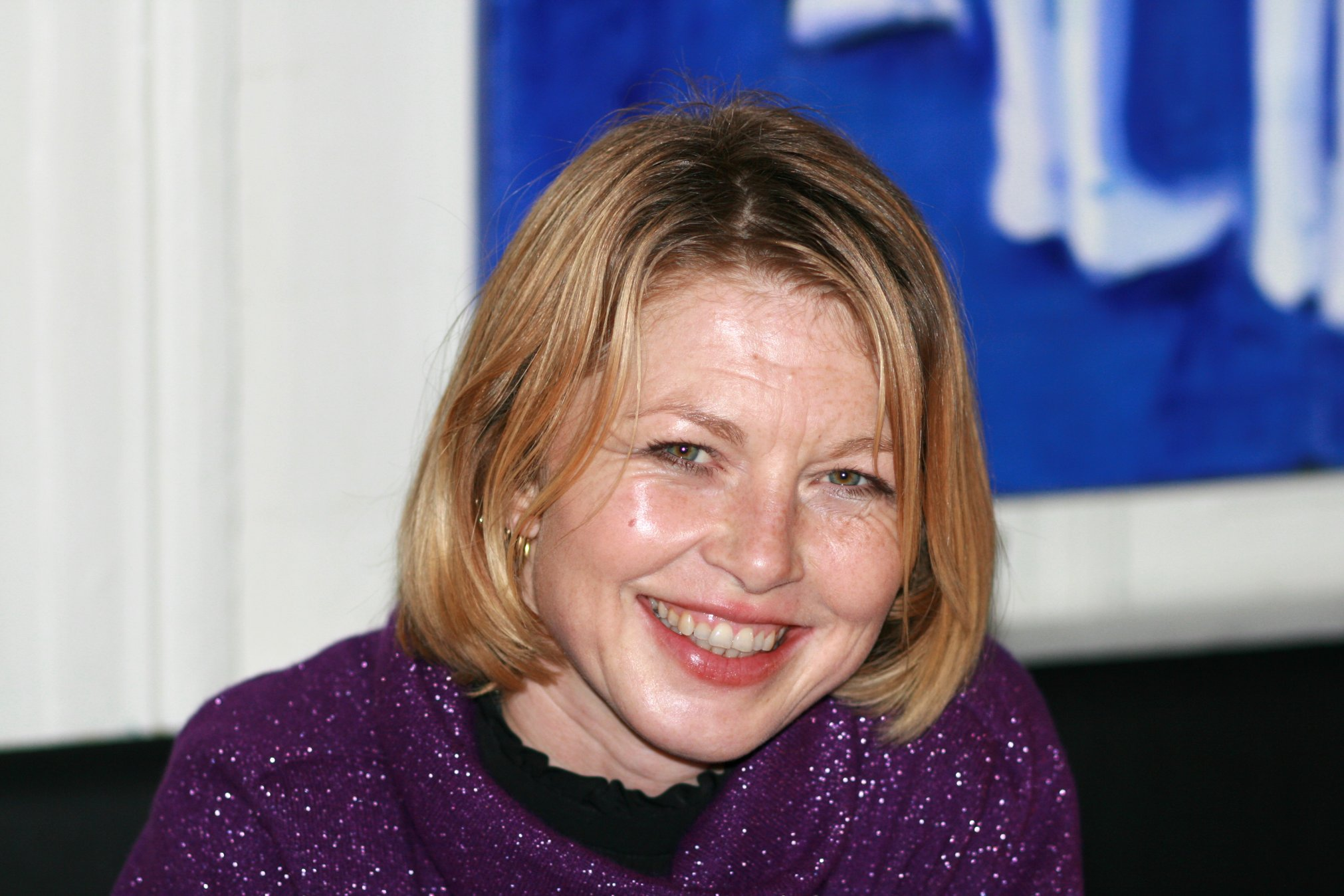
- Liabø in 2007
- Born: 26 July 1971 (age 55); Førde, Vestland, Norway
- Education: University of Bergen
- Occupations: Author; translator
- Known for: Novels and children’s books in Norwegian; translations from English

Marita Burmann Liabø (born 26 July 1971) is a Norwegian author.

Hailing from Førde Municipality, she graduated with the cand.philol. degree in English from the University of Bergen in 1996. In her early career, she held various odd jobs, including in hotels, the postal service, and as a subtitler in NRK. She settled in Eastern Norway.

She made her debut in 1999 with the novel Tempus Fugit. Brytning followed in 2000, then Han liker meg in 2001, Mafia in 2004, Under brua in 2006 and Hoppe naken in 2007. The children's book Vida Vagabond blir haimat came in 2009. These were all published by Gyldendal Norsk Forlag. Her next children's book Jenny blir knallhard (2010) came out on Det Norske Samlaget, as did Pusteproblem (2014).

As a translator, she has translated authors such as Andy Stanton and Terry Pratchett into Norwegian. In her writings, she switches between the nynorsk and bokmål language forms.
