= Elster =

Elster (/ˈɛlstər/; German pronunciation: [ˈʔɛlstɐ], meaning 'magpie') may refer to:

- Elster (German tax portal)

== Places ==
- Elster (Elbe), a village and former municipality in Saxony-Anhalt, Germany
- Elster Mountains, in Saxony and the Czech Republic
- Black Elster (Schwarze Elster), a river in Germany
- White Elster (Weiße Elster), a river in Germany and the Czech Republic
  - Elster Viaduct, a railway bridge over the White Elster
  - Elster Viaduct (Pirk), a road bridge over the White Elster
- Bad Elster, a spa town in the Vogtlandkreis district, in Saxony, Germany
  - Bad Elster Spa Museum
- Kleine Elster, a river of Brandenburg, Germany
- Amt Kleine Elster (Niederlausitz), an Amt (collective municipality) in the district of Elbe-Elster, Germany
- Berga/Elster, a former town in the district of Greiz, in Thuringia, Germany
- Crossen an der Elster, a village and municipality in the Saale-Holzland district, in Thuringia, Germany
- Elbe-Elster, a Kreis (district) in the southern part of Brandenburg, Germany
  - Falkenberg/Elster, a town in Elbe-Elster
    - Falkenberg (Elster) station, a railway station
- Wünschendorf/Elster, a village and former municipality in the district of Greiz, in Thuringia, Germany
- Zahna-Elster, a town in the district of Wittenberg, Saxony-Anhalt, Germany

== People ==
=== Surname ===
- Charles Harrington Elster (born 1957), American writer, broadcaster, and logophile
- Charlotte Elster, German-American physicist
- Else Elster (1910–1998), German film actress
- Erwin Elster (1887–1977), Polish painter and pedagogue
- Gottlieb Elster (1867–1917), German sculptor
- Ingolf Elster Christensen (1872–1943), Norwegian jurist, military officer, county governor and politician
- Jennifer Elster (active since 2001), American experimental artist, filmmaker, writer, photographer and performer
- Jon Elster, (born 1940), Norwegian social and political theorist
- Julius Elster (1854–1920), German teacher and physicist
- Kevin Elster (born 1964), American Major League Baseball player
- Kristian Elster (born 1841) (1841–1881), Norwegian novelist, journalist, literary critic and theatre critic
- Kristian Elster (born 1881) (1881–1947), Norwegian novelist, literary historian, theatre critic and biographer
- Magli Elster (1912–1993), Norwegian psychoanalyst, literary critic, poet and translator
- Torolf Elster (1911–2006), Norwegian journalist, editor and writer

=== Fictional characters ===
- Elster, the protagonist of the video game Signalis
- David, Fred, Leo, Max, Mia, and Niska Elster, characters in the television series Humans

== Other uses ==
- Battle on the Elster
- Elster glaciation (Elsterian Stage)
- Elster Valley Railway (White Elster)
- Operation Elster, a German espionage mission during World War II
- Pützer Elster, a light aircraft

== See also ==
- C. A. Elster Building, a historic commercial building in Springville, California
- Elstra, a town in the district of Bautzen, in Saxony, Germany
- The Stranger from Elster Street (German: Die Fremde aus der Elstergasse), a 1921 German silent drama film
- Elstree, a village in England
