= Kristian Elster =

Kristian Elster may refer to:

- Kristian Elster (born 1841) (1841–1881), Norwegian writer, often called Kristian Elster d.e.
- Kristian Elster (born 1881) (1881–1947), Norwegian writer, often called Kristian Elster d.y.

== See also ==
- Elster (disambiguation)
