= Taxation in Germany =

Taxes in Germany are levied by the federal government, the 16 states (Länder), and municipalities (Städte/Gemeinden). The system includes both direct and indirect taxes, with income tax and value-added tax (VAT) being the largest sources of revenue. Taxation is governed by the Basic Law (Grundgesetz), which allocates taxing powers and revenue between the different levels of government.

Some taxes, such as customs duties and certain excise taxes, are collected exclusively at the federal level, while others, including income tax, corporation tax, and VAT, are shared between the federation and the states. Municipalities levy local taxes, including property tax (Grundsteuer) and trade tax (Gewerbesteuer).

== Taxation principles ==
German tax law is subject to constitutional principles set out in the Basic Law (Grundgesetz) and interpreted by the Federal Constitutional Court. These include:

- Equality: taxation should generally reflect a taxpayer's economic ability to pay, and taxpayers with the same economic capacity should be taxed equally.
- Legality: tax authorities must assess and collect taxes uniformly in accordance with the law.
- Minimum subsistence: income needed to provide a minimum level of subsistence must remain free from taxation.

Articles 105–107 of the Basic Law determine how taxing powers and tax revenue are divided between the federation, the states and municipalities.

=== Distribution of revenues ===
Article 106 of the Basic Law determines how tax revenue is divided between the federation, the states and municipalities. Some taxes accrue primarily to one level of government: federal taxes include energy, tobacco and insurance taxes; state taxes include inheritance and real property transfer taxes; and municipal taxes include trade tax and property tax.

Income tax, corporation tax and value-added tax are joint taxes whose revenue is shared between the federation and the states. Municipalities also receive shares of income tax and value-added tax.

Article 107 provides for financial equalisation among the states. Differences in their financial capacity are reduced mainly through adjustments to the distribution of value-added tax revenue, supplemented by federal grants.

== Tax system and administration ==
Germany's tax administration is organised at both federal and state level. Most taxes are administered by the states through local tax offices (*Finanzämter*), which assess taxes, process tax returns and collect payments. The Federal Central Tax Office (*Bundeszentralamt für Steuern*, BZSt) carries out federal tax-administration tasks, including the issuance of tax identification numbers.

The Fiscal Code (*Abgabenordnung*, AO) provides the general rules and procedures that apply across the tax system, while individual tax laws regulate specific taxes. Tax disputes are heard by Fiscal Courts (*Finanzgerichte*), with the Federal Fiscal Court (*Bundesfinanzhof*) serving as the highest court of fiscal jurisdiction.

=== Tax identification numbers ===
People registered in Germany are assigned a personal tax identification number (*Steueridentifikationsnummer*) by the BZSt. The BZSt also assigns a business identification number (*Wirtschafts-Identifikationsnummer*) to economically active persons and entities. Local tax offices issue tax numbers (*Steuernummer*) for individual tax matters.

=== Electronic filing ===
Tax returns in Germany can be submitted electronically through ELSTER, the official portal of the German tax administration. The system supports online submission and access to pre-filled tax data (eDaten), such as wage-tax and social-insurance information submitted by employers and related institutions.

=== Double taxation agreements ===
Germany has double taxation agreements with about 90 countries, largely following the OECD Model Tax Convention. They cover income and wealth taxes as well as inheritance and gift taxes, and provide for cooperation between tax authorities, including exchange of information.

== Tax revenue ==
Germany’s tax revenue, including compulsory social security contributions, amounted to 38.0% of gross domestic product (GDP) in 2024, compared with the OECD average of 34.1%. Germany ranked 13th among the 38 OECD member countries. Its tax-to-GDP ratio rose from 37.3% in 2023 and was higher than the 36.0% recorded in 2000.

Social security contributions, personal income taxes and value-added tax (VAT) accounted for most revenue. In 2023, the composition was as follows:

| Revenue source | Share of total |
|---|---|
| Social security contributions | 38.4% |
| Personal income taxes | 26.4% |
| Value-added tax | 18.5% |
| Corporate income taxes | 6.0% |
| Property taxes | 2.5% |
| Other taxes | 8.2% |

Compared with the OECD average, Germany derived a larger share of revenue from social security contributions and personal income taxes, and a smaller share from corporate income taxes, property taxes and VAT.

== Taxes on income ==
Personal income tax (Einkommensteuer) applies to individuals. Residents are generally taxed on their worldwide income, while non-residents may be taxed on certain German-source income. Double-taxation agreements can limit Germany's taxing rights and provide relief from double taxation.

The tax covers income from employment, business, self-employment, investments, property letting, agriculture and forestry, and other sources specified by law. Taxable income is determined after eligible expenses, deductions and allowances, rather than simply equalling gross earnings. A basic personal allowance (Grundfreibetrag) is tax-free. Above it, marginal tax rates rise progressively from 14% to 42%, with a top rate of 45% for very high incomes. Each rate applies only to the corresponding portion of income. Investment income is subject to a separate 25% rate.

Eligible married couples may choose joint assessment, known as Ehegattensplitting. Their combined taxable income is divided equally between them, and the tax calculated on one half is doubled. Because income tax rates are progressive, this method generally reduces the couple’s total tax when their taxable incomes differ. The same treatment applies to registered civil partners.

Families may receive child benefit (Kindergeld) or benefit from child-related tax allowances; the tax office determines whether the allowances provide greater relief.

Employers generally withhold income tax from wages as Lohnsteuer. Wage-tax withholding uses tax classes (Steuerklassen), which reflect circumstances such as marital status, eligibility for single-parent relief and multiple employment. The tax class affects withholding during the year but does not change the underlying annual income-tax tariff. Tax on many forms of investment income is also withheld at source. Taxpayers whose liability is not fully covered by withholding may be required to make advance payments.

=== Capital income ===
Germany generally taxes capital gains within the income tax system rather than through a separate capital gains tax. For private investors, income from capital assets includes interest, dividends and gains from the sale of securities. Such income is generally subject to a special income tax rate of 25%, plus the solidarity surcharge and, where applicable, church tax.

The tax is commonly withheld by banks and other financial institutions as capital income tax (Kapitalertragsteuer). For private capital income, this withholding generally settles the income tax liability and is therefore known as the Abgeltungsteuer.

== Social security contributions ==
Most employees in Germany are covered by statutory social insurance. Contributions are based on employment income up to annual ceilings and are generally shared between employers and employees.

The contribution rates for 2026 are:

| Insurance | Contribution rate | Annual income ceiling |
|---|---|---|
| Pension | 18.6% | €101,400 |
| Unemployment | 2.6% | €101,400 |
| Health | 14.6% plus a supplementary contribution set by each insurer | €69,750 |
| Long-term care | 3.6% standard rate | €69,750 |

== Business taxation ==
=== Corporation tax ===
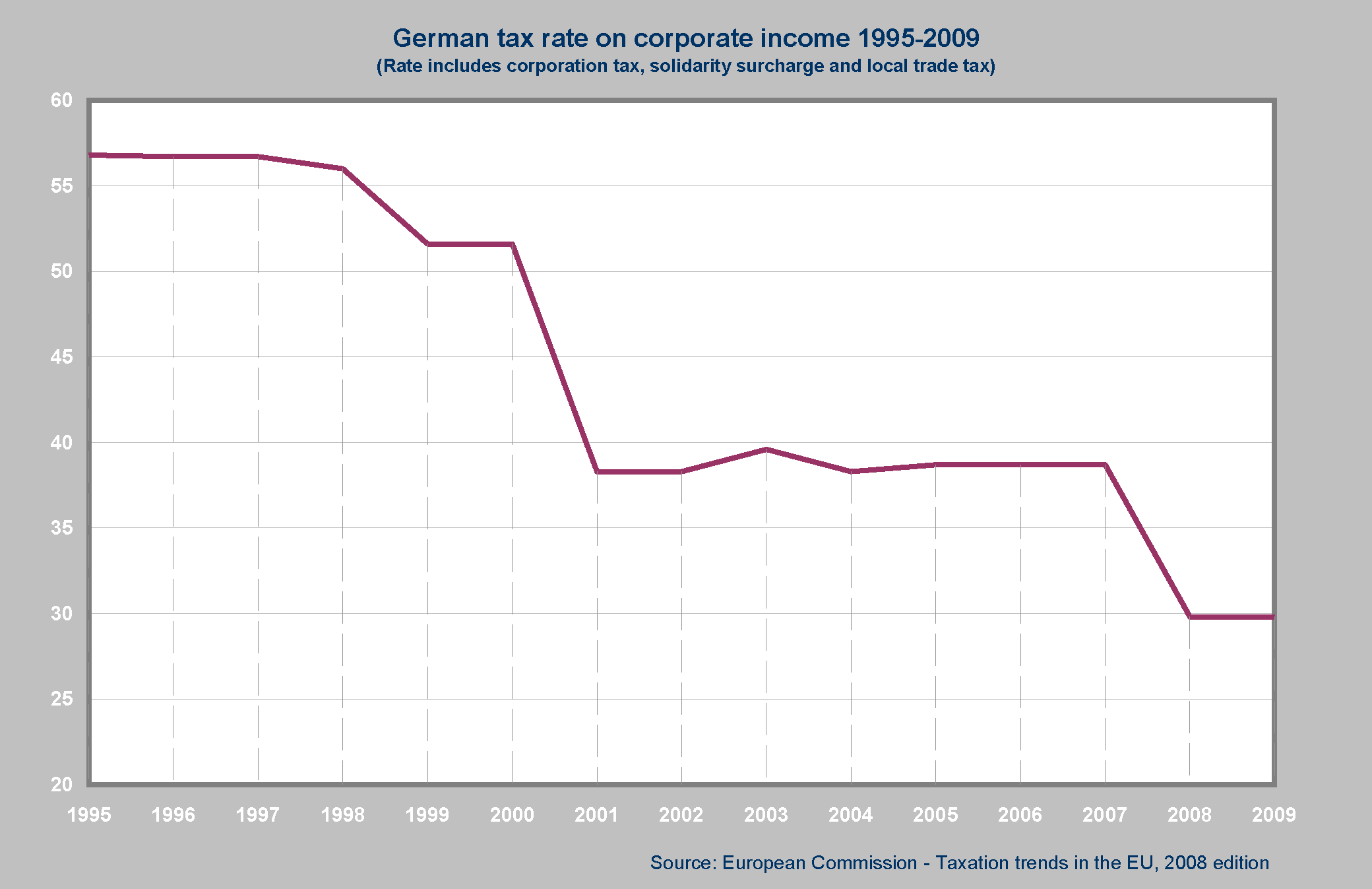
German tax rate on corporate income 1995–2009

Corporation tax (Körperschaftsteuer) is levied on companies and other legal entities, including limited liability companies (GmbH), stock corporations (AG), cooperatives, associations and foundations. Sole proprietorships and most partnerships are instead taxed through their owners or partners, although qualifying partnerships may opt for corporation tax treatment.

Corporations with their registered office or place of management in Germany are generally taxed on their worldwide income. Other corporations are generally taxed only on certain German-source income. Certain charitable, religious and other qualifying organizations may be exempt from corporation tax.

The corporation tax rate is 15% through 2027. A solidarity surcharge of 5.5% of the corporation tax liability is also charged. Commercial businesses are generally subject to municipal trade tax, so the overall tax burden varies by municipality and averages around 30%. The corporation tax rate is scheduled to fall by one percentage point each year from 2028, reaching 10% from 2032.

==== Group taxation ====
For corporation tax purposes, qualifying companies may form a tax group (Organschaft). The income of a controlled company is then attributed to the controlling company, allowing profits and losses within the group to be offset.

The main requirements include majority voting control and a profit-transfer agreement between the companies. The agreement must generally run for at least five years and be followed throughout that period.

=== Trade tax ===
Businesses operating in Germany may be subject to municipal trade tax (Gewerbesteuer) in addition to income tax or corporation tax. The tax is based on business income adjusted according to statutory rules. A uniform tax base rate of 3.5% is applied, and the resulting amount is multiplied by a municipal multiplier (Hebesatz) set by each municipality. As a result, the effective trade tax rate varies between municipalities.

For sole proprietors and partners in partnerships, trade tax attributable to their business income may be credited against personal income tax, subject to statutory limits. Trade tax is not deductible as a business expense for income tax or corporation tax purposes.

==== Assessment procedure ====
The business entity has to file the trade tax return with the tax office, like its other tax returns. Taking any allowances into account, the local tax office (Finanzamt) calculates the trade earnings and then gives the applicable figure for a trade tax assessment to the local authority collecting the tax. The underlying profit base, as well as the book-tax differences for the local trade tax jurisdictions, may differ from that used for the corporation tax. On the basis of the collecting rate (Hebesatz) in force in its area, the local authority calculates the trade tax payable.

== Property and transfer taxes ==
=== Property tax ===
Municipalities levy property tax (Grundsteuer) on land and buildings. Following a 2018 ruling by the Federal Constitutional Court, a reformed system took effect on 1 January 2025.

Under the federal model, the tax is calculated using the assessed value of the property, a statutory measurement rate and an assessment rate (Hebesatz) set by the municipality. Baden-Württemberg, Bavaria, Hamburg, Hesse and Lower Saxony use their own models, while several other states apply limited variations of the federal system.

=== Real property transfer tax ===
Real property transfer tax (Grunderwerbsteuer) is generally charged when German real estate is transferred to a new owner. The tax is usually based on the purchase price. Although buyer and seller can both be liable, the buyer normally pays it.

Each state sets its own tax rate. In 2026, rates range from 3.5% in Bavaria to 6.5% in Brandenburg, North Rhine-Westphalia, Saarland and Schleswig-Holstein.

Some transfers are exempt, including inheritances and gifts, transfers between spouses or registered partners, and transfers between relatives in the direct line. Transactions with a taxable value of no more than €2,500 are also exempt.

The tax may also apply to certain transactions involving companies that own German real estate, including changes in company ownership.

=== Inheritance and gift tax ===
Inheritance tax and gift tax are governed by the same law. The tax depends mainly on the value received and the relationship between the recipient and the deceased or donor. There are three tax classes, with rates ranging from 7% to 50%.

Tax-free allowances also depend on the family relationship. Spouses and registered partners generally receive an allowance of €500,000, children €400,000 and grandchildren €200,000. Most other recipients receive an allowance of €20,000.

Transfers from the same person within a ten-year period are combined when calculating the tax. Additional exemptions may apply to assets such as qualifying family homes and business property.

== Consumption taxes ==
=== Value-added tax ===
Value-added tax (VAT), known in Germany as Umsatzsteuer or Mehrwertsteuer, is a tax on consumption. Businesses charge VAT on taxable sales and generally deduct the VAT paid on eligible business purchases. The tax is intended to be borne by the final consumer. Germany follows the EU's common VAT framework.

The standard rate is 19%. A reduced rate of 7% applies to certain goods and services, including many foods, books, passenger rail transport and hotel accommodation. Qualifying photovoltaic systems and their installation are taxed at 0%. Some services are exempt, including certain medical treatments, educational services and financial services.

Under the small-business scheme (Kleinunternehmerregelung), qualifying businesses do not charge VAT on eligible sales. Their turnover must not exceed €25,000 in the preceding calendar year or €100,000 in the current calendar year. They may choose to apply the normal VAT rules instead. Businesses using the scheme generally cannot deduct VAT paid on related purchases. Businesses following the regular VAT rules submit monthly or quarterly provisional tax returns and an annual tax return.

Travellers who live outside the EU may receive a VAT refund on eligible goods they take out of the EU in their personal luggage. Refunds depend on the purchase value and time of export.

== Motor vehicle tax ==
The motor vehicle tax (Kraftfahrzeugsteuer) is a federal tax on vehicles registered for use on public roads. It is generally paid by the registered vehicle holder and is administered by German Customs.

For passenger cars, the tax depends on the date of first registration. Cars first registered since July 2009 are generally taxed according to engine displacement and carbon-dioxide emissions. For cars first registered since 2021, the CO2 component rises progressively with emissions.

Pure electric vehicles (BEVs) first registered by 31 December 2030 are exempt from the tax for up to ten years, but no later than 31 December 2035. After the exemption expires, their motor vehicle tax is reduced by 50%.

== Tax evasion ==
In Germany, tax evasion is punishable as a criminal offense under Section 370 AO and can be punished with a prison sentence of up to five years or a fine. In particularly serious cases - such as evaded taxes in excess of €50,000 - the penalty is six months to ten years' imprisonment in accordance with Section 370 (3) AO. The tax authorities often use so-called penalty tables to determine the penalty for tax evasion, in which a penalty is assigned to a certain amount of evasion, for example a fine or prison sentence. The Federal Court of Justice has made it clear that a six-figure evasion amount is generally subject to a custodial sentence, even if this is suspended.

== See also ==
- Tax return in Germany
- Elster (German tax portal)
- Steuerberater
- German Taxpayers Federation
