= WISO Steuer =

- Developer: Buhl Data Service GmbH
- Release: March 1991
- Operating system: Windows, macOS, iOS, iPadOS, Android
- Platform: Desktop, web, mobile
- Type: Tax preparation software
- License: Proprietary
- Website: www.buhl.de/steuer/

WISO Steuer is a German tax preparation software published by Buhl Data Service. It's available for web, as desktop software for Windows and macOS, or as mobile app for Android and iOS.

Independent reviews have described it as tax software suitable for both straightforward and complex tax situations. It supports a wide range of tax cases, including income from employment, pensions, investments, rental property and freelancing, as well as foreign-source income.

Its association with the ZDF and WISO business programme began after a member of the ZDF editorial staff encountered Buhl's tax software in 1991 and started a cooperation.

== History ==
The software was first released in 1991 under the name WISO Steuer-Sparbuch and was marketed through ZDF business TV magazine WISO. By 1999, Buhl released its first web version, enabling users to submit tax returns online.

In 2011, Buhl introduced a native version of WISO Steuer for macOS. The product then expanded to tablets in 2014, allowing users to prepare a tax return on an iPad or Android tablet and synchronize data across devices.

In April 2019, Buhl launched ilovetax, a smartphone tax app for users with simple tax cases. Buhl subsequently developed a more comprehensive WISO Steuer smartphone app, which was published in 2021.

== Features ==
- Importing wage-tax certificates and insurance data held by the tax authorities;
- Reusing data from previous tax returns;
- Scanning of receipts and other supporting documents;
- Importing and categorizing bank transactions via Buhl's finanzblick;
- Checks for completeness and plausibility;
- SteuerGPT, an AI-based assistant for tax-related topics;
- Retrieving the tax assessment notice (Steuerbescheid) and comparing it with the submitted data;

For an additional fee, users can have tax return reviewed by a tax adviser through the Buhl ProfiCheck. This service is provided by Buhl Steuerberatungsgesellschaft.

== Reception ==
Computer Bild has described it as a comprehensive software for both simple and more complex tax situations in its 2026 review. Finanztip has selected WISO Steuer as its overall recommendation in its last comparison.

== Publisher ==
Buhl Data Service is a privately held, family-owned software company headquartered in Neunkirchen. The company reported over 700 employees and revenue of €185.4 million for 2024.

== See also ==
- Tax return in Germany
- Elster (German tax portal)
- Income tax in Germany
