= Corporation tax in Germany =

In Germany, corporate taxation is overseen by the Federal Ministry of Economic Affairs and Energy. As of 2026, no standardized corporate tax rate exists—due to rate variations in local trade taxes (Gewerbesteuer). Currently, the average combined corporate tax rate in Germany is roughly 30%. In accordance with the 2025 reforms, the combined corporate tax rate in Germany will decrease by one percent annually for five years, beginning in 2028. By 2032, the combined corporate tax rate and the corporate income tax (Körperschaftsteuer) are expected to reach 25% and 10%, respectively. The average combined corporate tax rate is expected to be approximately 24.6%.

== Components ==
=== Corporate income tax ===
The corporate income tax (Körperschaftsteuer) is levied as a flat nation-wide tax, with a rate of 15% applied to taxable corporate income.

=== Solidarity Surcharge ===
The solidarity surcharge (Solidaritätszuschlag) is a flat tax component of the combined corporate tax rate. It is applied at 5.5% of the corporate income tax rate.

=== Trade tax ===
The trade tax (Gewerbesteuer) is a municipal tax levied on all commercial businesses in Germany.The minimum rate will is, and will remain, seven percent (7%) until 2027—after which, the minimum rate will be raised to 9.8%.

The trade tax rate is applied equally to all businesses within a single municipality, although urban regions tend to report higher rates than their rural counterparts.The solidarity surcharge is not levied on the trade tax; Accordingly, the trade tax rate is dependent on two factors (seen below):

- Hebesatz: The individually-stipulated municipal multiplier.
- Tax Base Amount: The taxable income of a company, multiplied by the German tax base rate of 3.5%.

The municipal multiplier has a minimum rate of 200%, with the average currently being slightly over 400%. For the tax year of 2025, municipalities with a minimum of 80,000 inhabitants levied a tax rate of between 8.75% (multiplier of 250%) and 20.3% (muiltiplier of 580%). As of 2026, no statutory upper limit is reported for the municipal multiplier or the trade tax.

== See also ==
- Corporate tax
- Tax rates in Europe
- Taxation in Germany
- Corporate tax rates in the European Union
- Common Consolidated Corporate Tax Base
