= Botanischer Garten Adorf =

Botanical garden in Saxony, Germany

Coordinates: 50.3062°N 12.2460°E

The Botanischer Garten Adorf is a botanical garden located at Waldbadstraße 7, Adorf, Saxony, Germany, created in 1997–1999 as an adjunct to the Klein-Vogtland miniatures park. It is open daily in the warmer months, and contains over 11,000 plants from high mountains around the world. In 2008, a small fire destroyed 300 plants and a part of the attached miniature park. By 2009, all damages had been repaired.

== See also ==
- List of botanical gardens in Germany
