= Adorf =

- Town
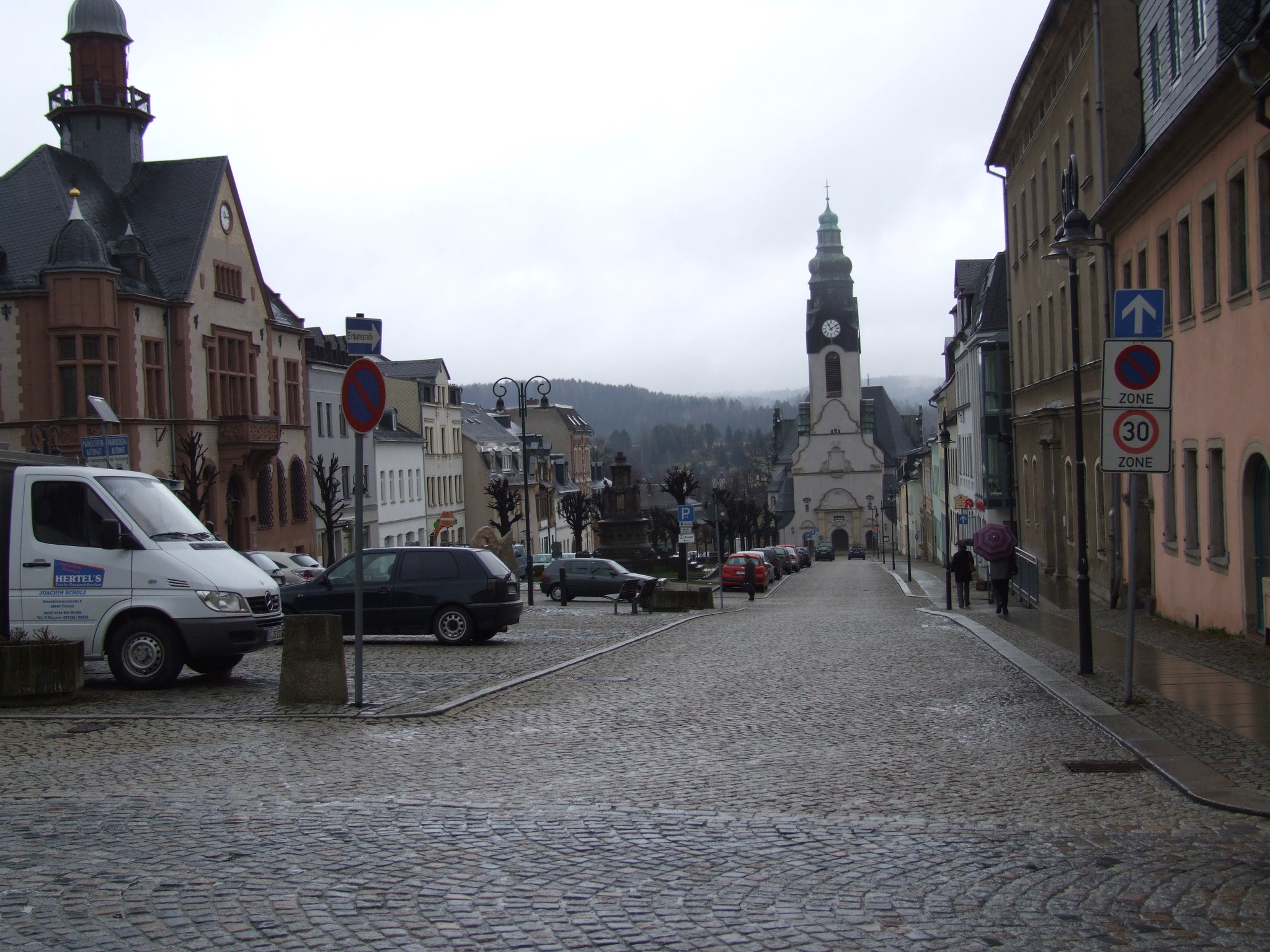

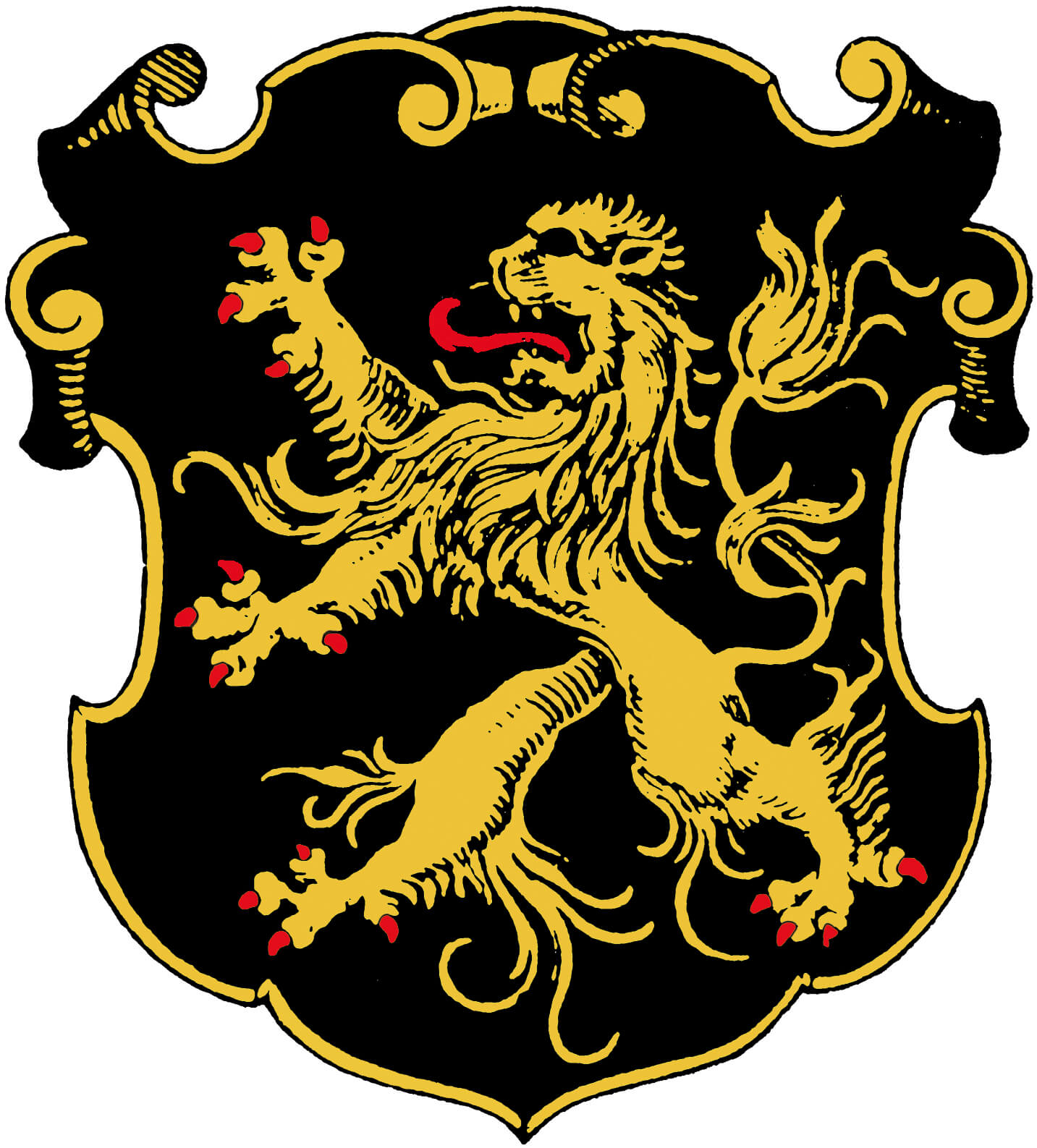
- Coat of arms

- Location of Adorf within Vogtlandkreis district
- Interactive map of Adorf
- Location within Germany Location within Saxony
- Coordinates: 50°19′N 12°16′E
- Country: Germany
- State: Saxony
- District: Vogtlandkreis

Government
  - Mayor (2018–25): Rico Schmidt

Area
  - Total: 42.92 km^{2} (16.57 sq mi)
- Elevation: 494 m (1,621 ft)

Population (2025-12-31)
  - Total: 4,376
  - Density: 102.0/km^{2} (264.1/sq mi)
- Time zone: UTC+01:00 (CET)
  - Summer (DST): UTC+02:00 (CEST)
- Postal codes: 08626
- Dialling codes: 037423
- Vehicle registration: V, AE, OVL, PL, RC
- Website: www.adorf-vogtland.de

Adorf (German pronunciation: [ˈadɔʁf]) is a small town and municipality in the Vogtlandkreis to the south-west of the Free State of Saxony, Germany. Gettengrün, a village within the municipality, borders on the Czech Republic.

== Etymology ==
The name Adorf can be understood to mean "village on the water", the "A-" coming from an Old High German word for a stream or river (aha). Dorf is the Modern German word meaning village.

== History ==
Historical affiliations

Kingdom of Bohemia 1327-1357
Margraviate of Meissen 1357-1485
Electorate of Saxony 1485-1547
Vogtland 1547-1569
Electorate of Saxony 1569-1697
Poland-Saxony 1697-1706
Electorate of Saxony 1706-1709
Poland-Saxony 1709-1763
Electorate of Saxony 1763-1806
Kingdom of Saxony 1806-1918
German Empire 1871-1918
Weimar Republic 1918-1933
Nazi Germany 1933-1945
Allied-occupied Germany 1945-1949
East Germany 1949-1990
Germany 1990-present

Map of Adorf (1794)

Adorf was founded around 1200. In 1293 it gained the status of a "town". The town walls were commenced in 1477. Industries developed because of its favorable position and transport links: crafts, spinning, weaving, embroidery working with mother-of-pearl and musical instrument making. The Johanniskirche was constructed in 1498. The town was destroyed by fire in 1768. The Freiberger Tor, the last remaining town gate in Vogtland, was rebuilt between 1768 and 1773 with a wooden framed upper storey. The current Rathaus was built in 1896- a period when many substantial houses were added to the streets round the market place. It also housed a convalescent home for the poor of the city of Leipzig.

== Geography ==
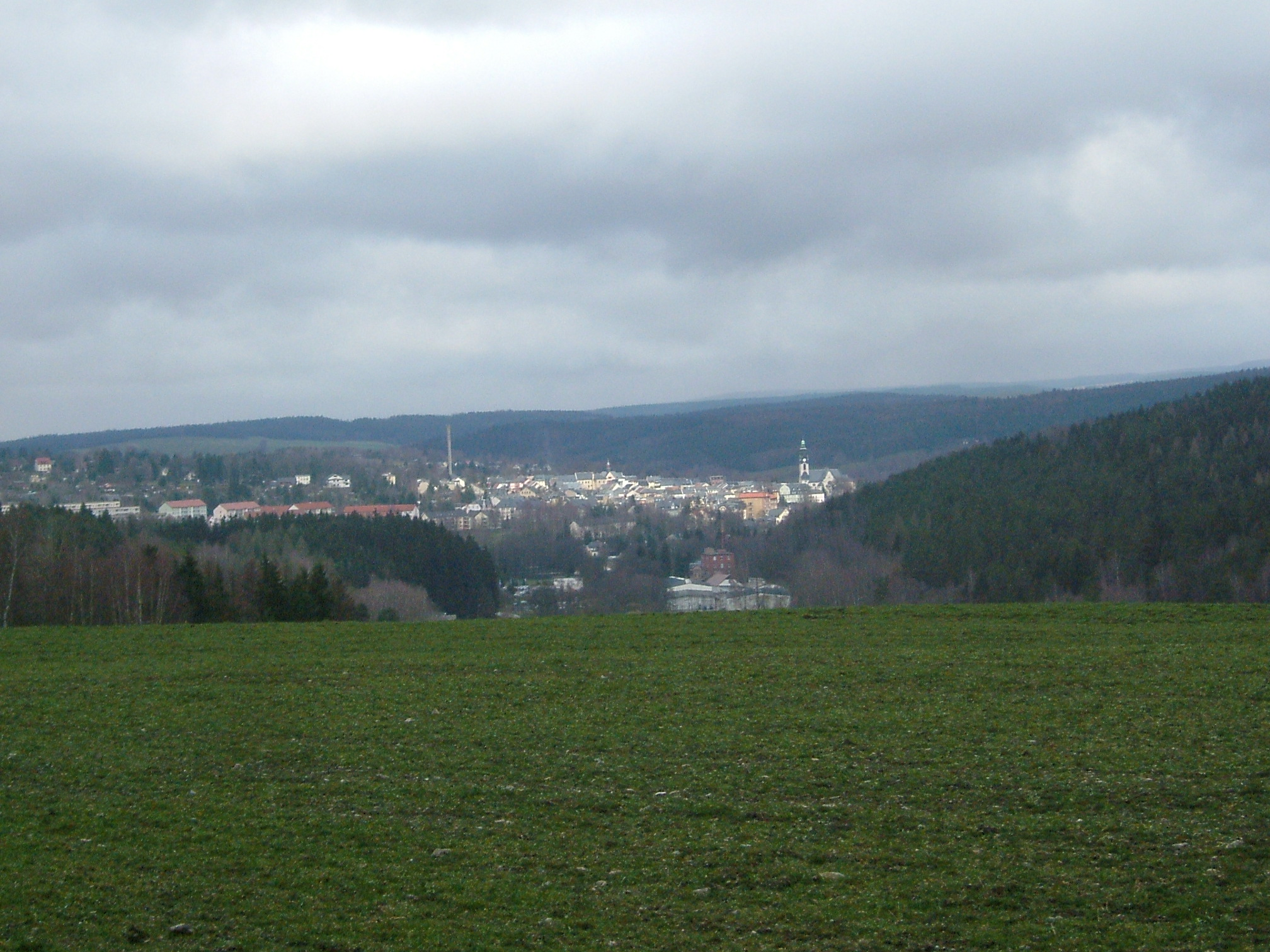
Adorf from the south, from the Brunnenberg

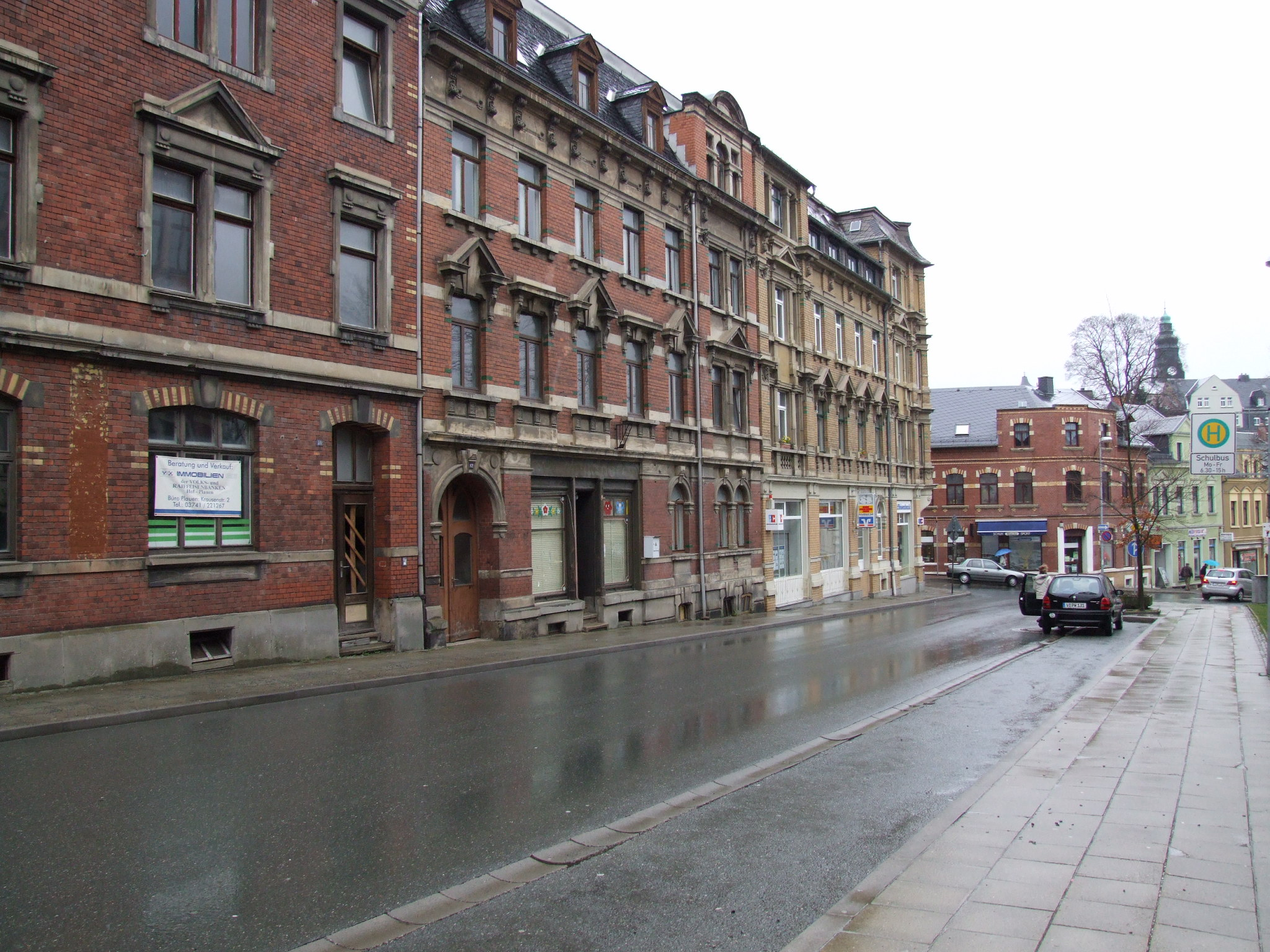
Substantial late 19th century buildings in Lessingstr.

Adorf is located in the Elster Mountains, a low mountain range, part of the Fichtel Mountains. The lowest point in the Adorf district being in Rebersreuth (415 m) and the highest point being the "Hoher Stein" ("high stone") near Gettengrün (632.9 m). This "Hoher Stein" is not the same as the Czech Vysoký kámen 5 km to the east, whose name is also "Hoher Stein" in German.

The town of Adorf lies at the junction of the White Elster and Schwarzbach. These rivers are in deep V-shaped heavily forested valleys. Many other brooks traverse Adorf: Tetterweinbach, Ameisenlohbach, Eisenbach and others. Alongside the Weise Elster runs the Bundesstrasse B92 and the Plauen–Cheb line, including Adorf (Vogtl) station, which is operated by Vogtlandbahn, that connects Plauen with Cheb in the Czech Republic, and ultimately Plzeň, Munich and Prague.

The Schwarzbach has its sources on the Vysoký kámen. Alongside it runs the Bundesstrasse B283 and a further railway line of the Vogtlandbahn, that link to Markneukirchen, Klingenthal and then Zwota and Zwickau.

The district includes the villages: Arnsgrün, Remtengrün, Hermsgrün, Rebersreuth, Leubetha, Freiberg, Jugelsburg and Sorge.

Adorf is bordered by Bad Elster, Eichigt, Markneukirchen Mühlental and the Czech Republic.

== Population ==
1500 - 1,000; 1779 - 1,300 (272 Dwellings); 1801 - 1,310 (268 Dwellings); 1815 - 1,862; 1831 - 2,395 (302 Dwellings); 1834 - 2,348 (311 Dwellings); 1910 - 7,887	1960 – 8,832; 1971 – 8,398; 1998 – 6,396; 1999 – 6,296; 2000 – 6,214; 2001 – 6,127	2002 – 6,017; 2004 – 5,817; 2005 – 6,096; 2007 – 5,563; 2008 – 5,474; 2013 – 5,178

== Places of interest ==
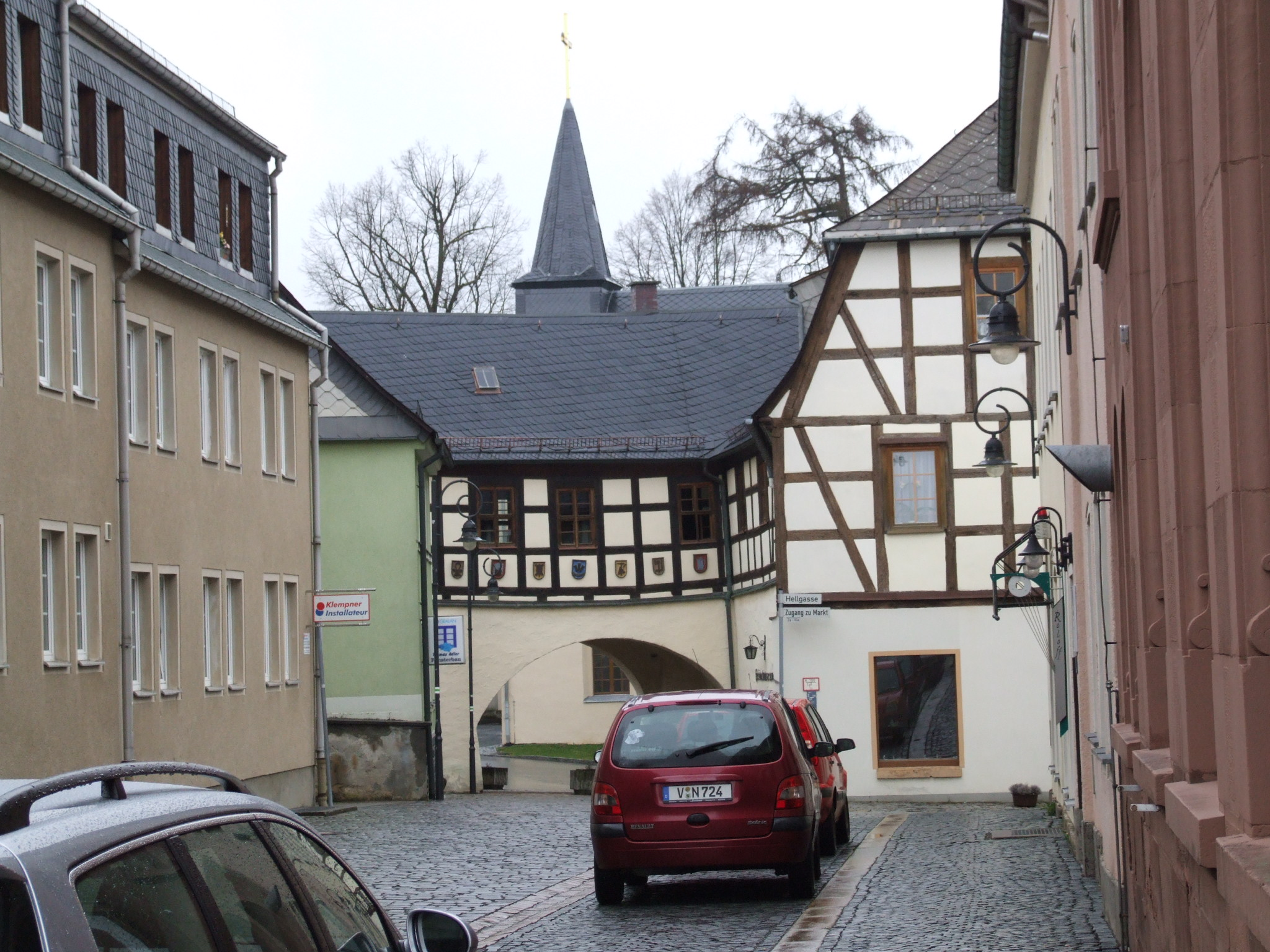
The Freiberger Tor

The "Freiberger Tor" is the only conserved town gate in the Vogtlandkreis, it houses a museum with the biggest exhibition of mother-of-pearl in Germany. Adorf has the longest marketplace in Vogtlandkreis: 231 metres. There is a war memorial for the soldiers who were killed during World War One and a memorial tablet for three citizens who were killed during the German-French war 1870/71. Johann Wolfgang von Goethe spent the night between 3–4 July 1795 at the old staging inn.

Near the town is "Miniaturschauanlage Klein-Vogtland", a tourist attraction with models of 50 buildings in the Vogtlandkreis built to a scale of 1:25. Its botanical garden, the Botanischer Garten Adorf, contains over 11,000 plants from high mountains around the world.

== Sons and daughters of the town ==
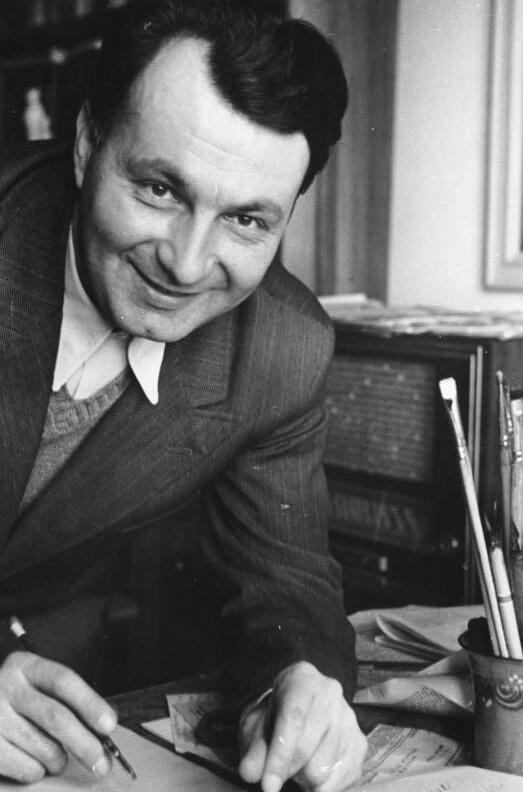
E. O. Plauen 1943

- Reinhold Becker, composer
- Johann Caspar Kerll (1627-1693), organist, harpsichordist and composer
- Carl Gotthelf Todt (1803-1852), mayor from 1832 to 1849
- Johann Adam Heckel (1812-1877), instrument maker
- E.o.plauen, (means: Erich Ohser from Plauen), Erich Ohser, (1903-1944), artist (Father and Son), born in Gettengrün
