= Reinhold Becker (composer) =

German composer (1842–1924)

Reinhold Becker (August 11, 1842 – December 7, 1924) was a German composer and violinist. Beginning his career as a violinist, he switched to composition after a muscular injury ended his playing career. His opera Frauenlob, to a libretto by Franz Koppel-Ellfeld, was premiered in Dresden in 1892. A native of Adorf, he died in Dresden.
