= Eugenia Kielland =

Norwegian writer (1878–1969)

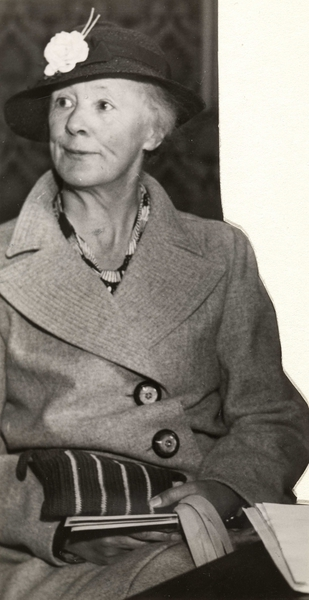
- Eugenia Kielland, c. 1933
- Born: 23 April 1878; Skedsmo, Norway
- Died: 7 July 1969 (aged 91); Oslo
- Occupations: Poet, short story writer, essayist, biographer and literary critic

Eugenia Kielland (23 April 1878 – 7 July 1969) was a Norwegian poet, short story writer, essayist, biographer and literary critic.

== Biography ==
Eguenia Marie Kielland was born in Skedsmo in Akershus, Norway. She was the daughter of Hjalmar Christian Kielland (1834-1927) and Fredrikke Gleerup Klem (1842-1924). Her father served as mayor of Skedsmo and deputy chairman of Akershus amt and Smålenenes amt. She was the granddaughter of author Gustava Kielland.

She was educated as a teacher and worked at Olaf Bergs pikeskole 1900-1915 and later at Hegdehaugen Skole 1915-1939. She was a literary critic for the newspaper Morgenposten from 1927 to 1963 and was the principal literary consultant for the publishing house Aschehoug from 1934 to 1960. She was a Norwegian editor for the magazine Ord och Bild from 1938 to 1950.

Among her books are the poetry collection Vildskud from 1918 and the essay collection Fem Essays om moderne norsk litteratur from 1929. Besides essays and articles, she also wrote biographical monographs on Nini Roll Anker, Kristian Elster and Sigurd Christiansen.

Kielland died in Oslo on 7 July 1969.

== Selected works ==
- Vildskud (1918)
- Vor lykke (1921)
- Brev fra Nils Collett Vogt til Nini Roll Anker (1947)
- Nini Roll Anker i liv og arbeid (1948)
- Min venn Kristian Elster (1950)
- Sigurd Christiansen i liv og diktning (1952)
