= Bad Elster =

- Town
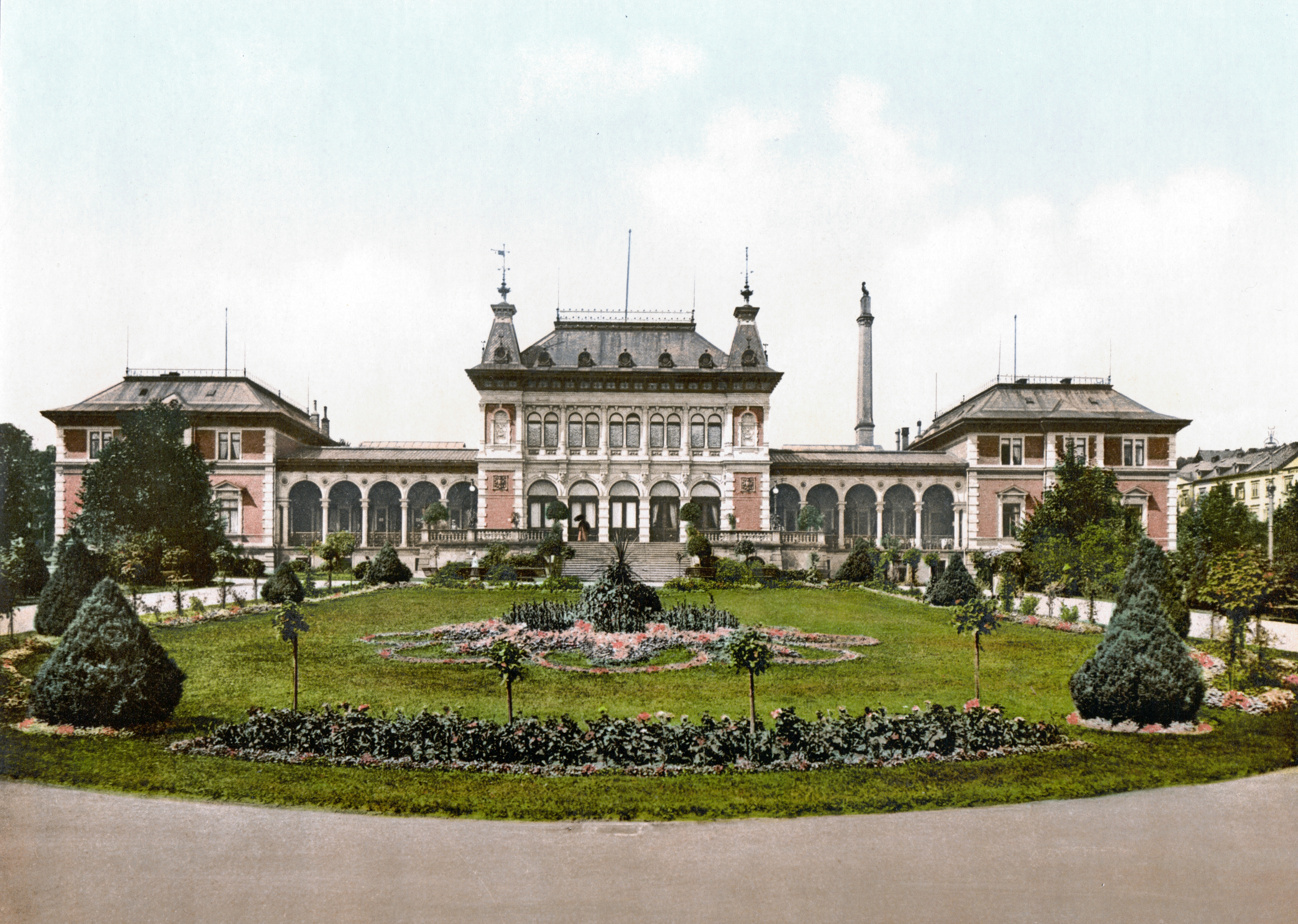

- Coat of arms

- Location of Bad Elster within Vogtlandkreis district
- Interactive map of Bad Elster
- Location within Germany Location within Saxony
- Coordinates: 50°16′55″N 12°14′5″E
- Country: Germany
- State: Saxony
- District: Vogtlandkreis

Government
  - Mayor (2022–29): Olaf Schlott

Area
  - Total: 19.77 km^{2} (7.63 sq mi)
- Elevation: 546 m (1,791 ft)

Population (2025-12-31)
  - Total: 3,502
  - Density: 177.1/km^{2} (458.8/sq mi)
- Time zone: UTC+01:00 (CET)
  - Summer (DST): UTC+02:00 (CEST)
- Postal codes: 08645
- Dialling codes: 037437
- Vehicle registration: V, AE, OVL, PL, RC
- Website: www.badelster.de

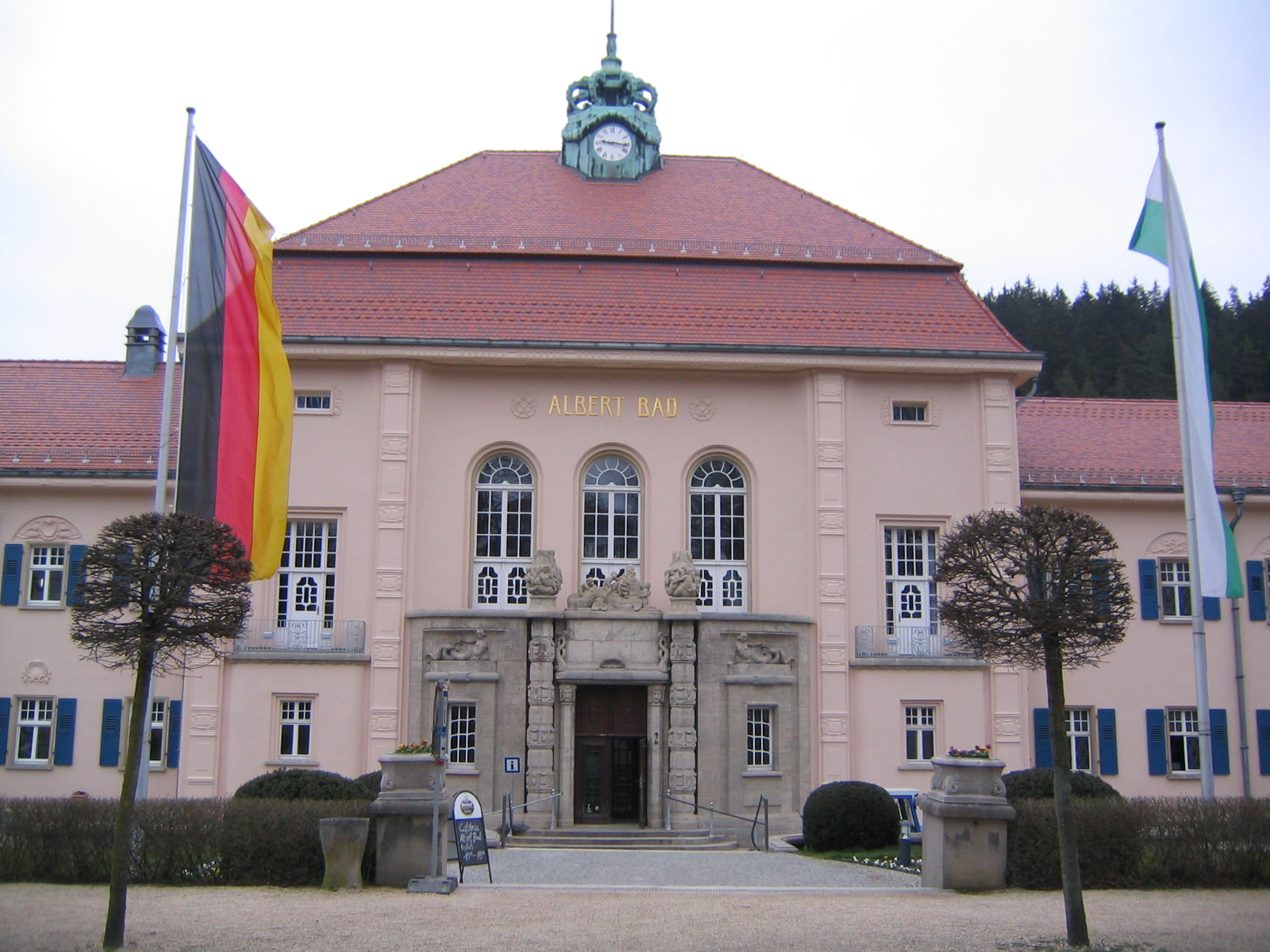
König-Albert-Bad

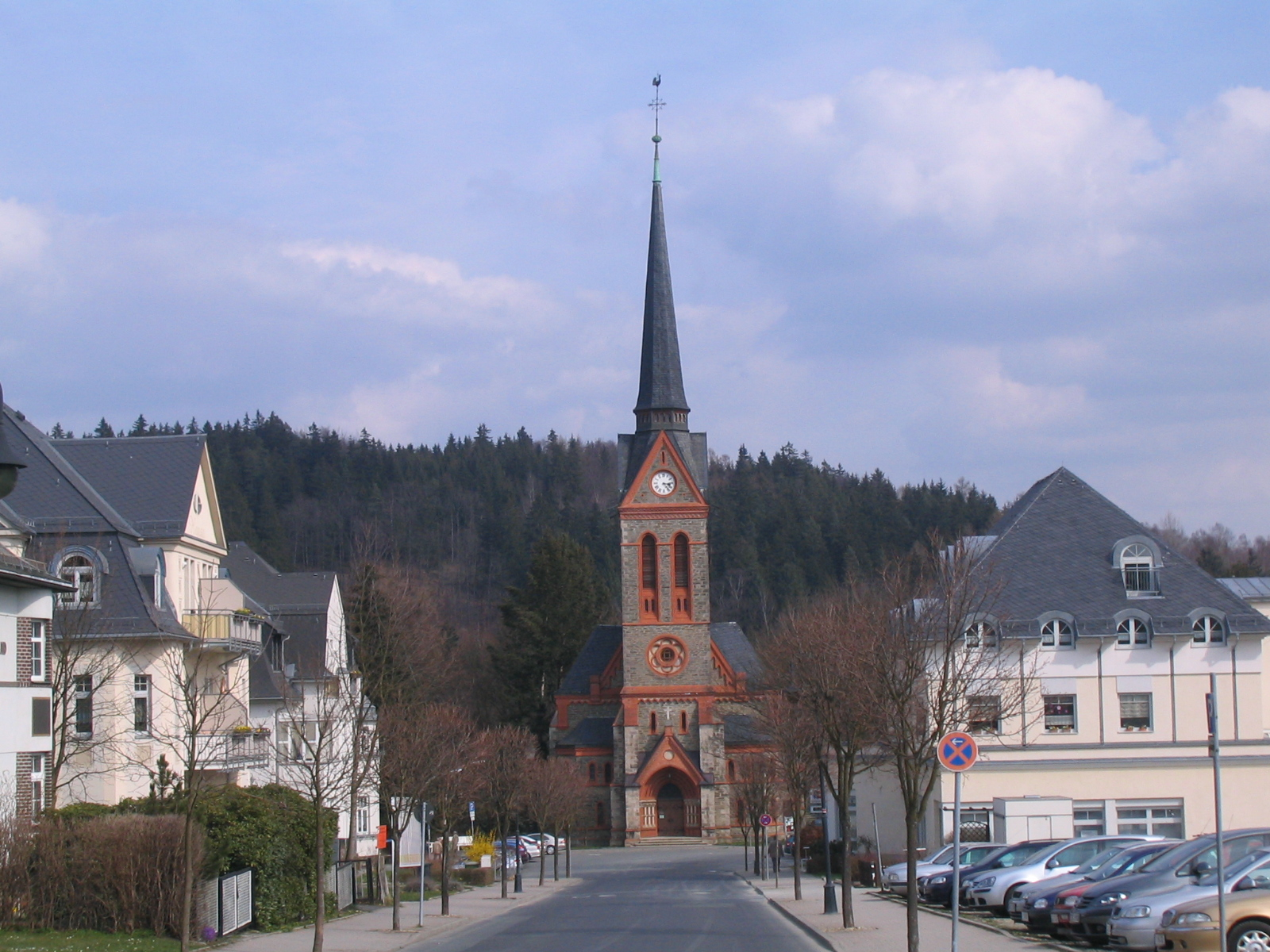
Bad Elster's Lutheran church

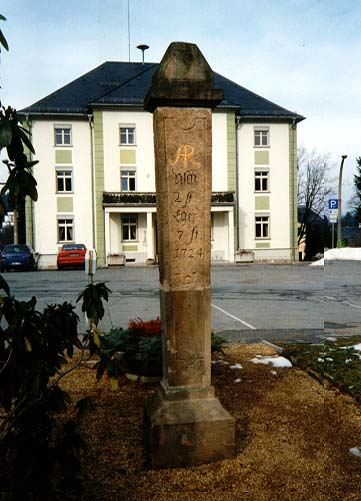
1724 "Halbmeilensäule" pillar in nearby Kirchberg

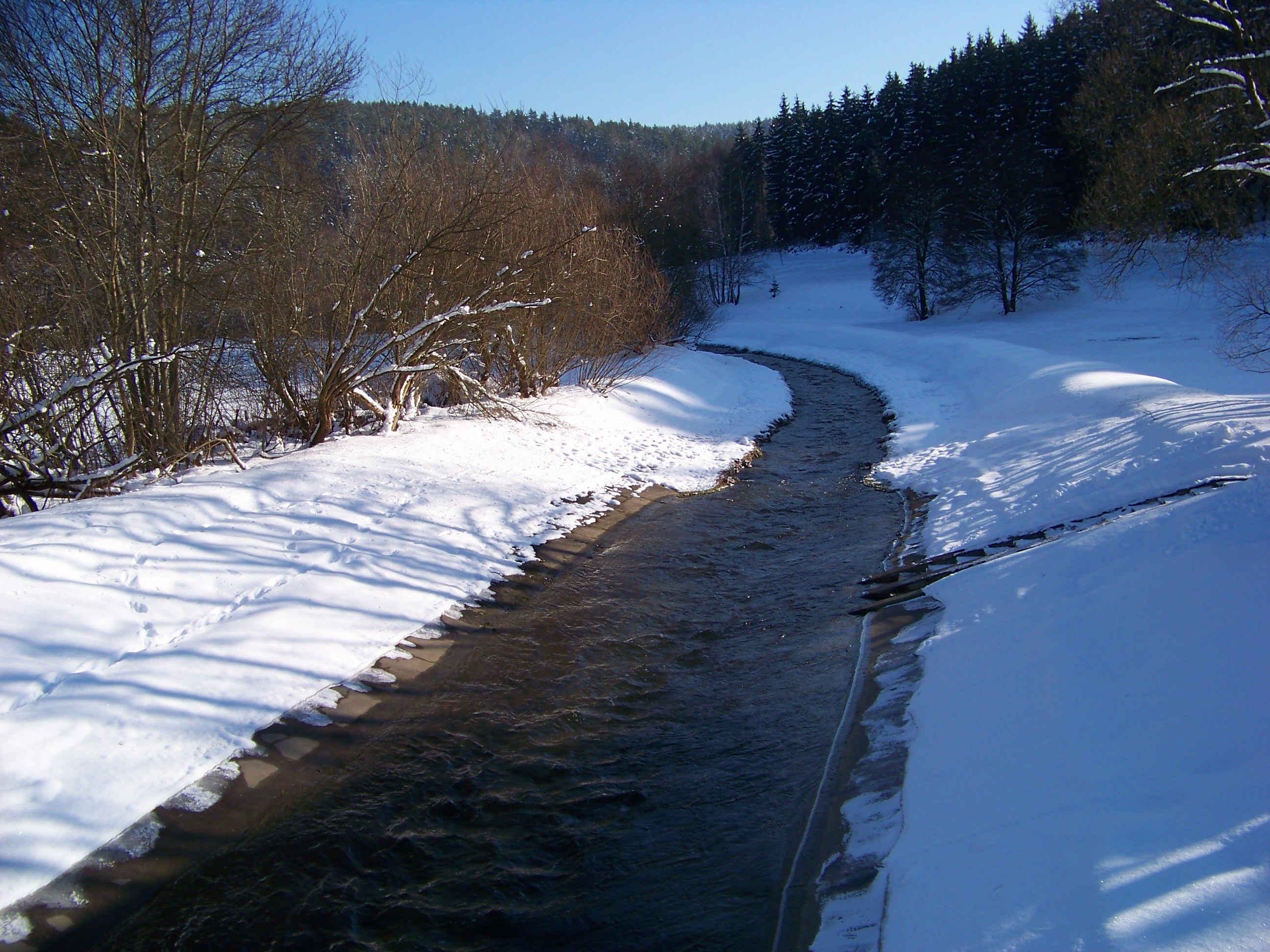
White Elster in Bad Elster/Heißenstein, nearby Czech border

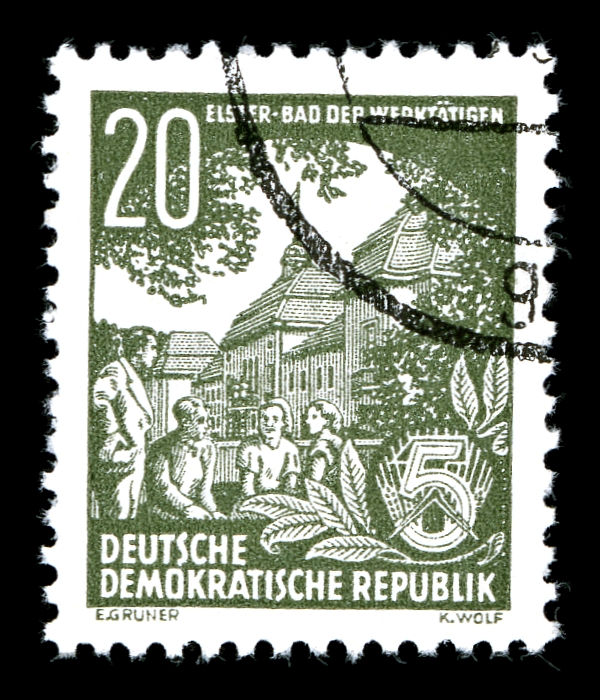
Stamp of the GDR with the text: "Elster Bad der Werktätigen" (Elster spa town of the workers), Five year plan of 1953, Workers of Kurhaus Elster (Health Resort)

Bad Elster (German pronunciation: [ˌbaːt ˈɛlstɐ]) is a spa town in the Vogtlandkreis district, in Saxony, Germany. It lies on the border of Saxony and the Czech Republic in the Elster gebirge hills. It is situated on the river White Elster, and is protected from extremes of temperature by the surrounding wooded hills. It is 25 kilometres (16 mi) southeast of Plauen, and 25 kilometres (16 mi) northwest of Cheb. It is part of the Freunde im Herzen Europas microregion.

== History ==
=== Elster before 1800 ===
Two kilometres north west of the town centre lies the remains of a twelfth-century walled village, known today as the "Alte Schloss" or "Old Castle". This was first documented in 1324. In 1412 a manor was sold to the von Zedtwitz family, who held it until 1800.

In 1533 the Reformation reached Adorf and its daughter church in Elster, and the first Protestant pastor was installed in 1540.

The healing properties of the waters from the spring now known as the Moritzquelle were recognised well before Georg Leisner, physician to the Duke Moritz von Sachsen-Zeitz, wrote in 1669 that inhabitants of both Adorf and Elster come to the spring to take the waters, and he had successfully used them on many different patients.

One famous visitor was Johann Wolfgang von Goethe, who came in 1795. He mentions the spring at Elster in his work Hermann and Dorothea.

=== (Bad) Elster in the 19th and 20th century ===
Elster became an independent parish in 1851. In 1892 the old St. Peter und Paul church was demolished and replaced with the Revival Gothic, St. Trinitatiskirche.

Elster was promoted to be the "Königlich-Sächsischen Staatsbad", official royal spa of Saxony in 1848. With that the visitor numbers rose: 1848: 129; 1850: 378, 1860: 1,750, 1870: 2,450, 1890: 5,870, 1900: 8,900, 1990: 15,600.

Elster prepended the Bad, meaning "spa", in 1875, Bad Elster became its official name in 1935. In 1880, Bademuseum Bad Elster opened; it was the first museum in the town and in Vogtland, but was short lived. A new museum opened in 1993.

== Places ==
Places within Bad Elster include Sohl and Mühlhausen.

== Demography ==
Growth of Population (from 1964 on, as of December 31st):

- 1834 - 701
- 1871 - 1,248
- 1890 - 1,120
- 1910 - 2,251
- 1925 - 3,368
- 1939 - 3,546
- 1946 - 3,657
- 1964 - 3,353
- 1971 - 3,336
- 1990 - 4,701
- 2003 - 4,101
- 2004 - 4,060

== Business ==
The main industries are tourism and health. There are seven clinics specialising in recuperation. In 2005 there were 35 establishments offering accommodation with 2,400 beds, and receiving 540,000 bednights.

The town lies near the B 92. There are two open border crossings into the Czech Republic; open for pedestrians and bicycles but not cars, though post Schengen even the barrier has been removed. The station is 2.5 km from the town centre at Mühlhausen on the Plauen Eger line where there is a two hourly service.

== Town Council ==
The elections in May 2014 showed the following results:

- Unabhängige Bürgerschaft (Independent citizens) 4 seats
- Freie Wähler (Free Voters)(independent): 3 seats
- CDU: 3 seats
- The Left: 2 seats
- SPD: 2 seats

== Coat of arms ==
Or a magpie proper on central peak of a triplemount vert, emerging from mount a fountain argent masoned or.

== Attractions ==
The most important buildings in Bad Elster are from the last quarter of the 19th century.

- The Royal Spa House (Königliches Kurhaus) is an important example of turn of the 20th century neoclassicism, demonstrating the importance of spa building to the state.
- The Albert Baths (Albert Bad) were built in the Jugendstil
- The King Albert Theatre (König Albert Theater), formerly called the spa theatre (Kurtheater), opened in 1914 and has been recently modernised. Alexander, Prince of Saxony, is the theatres patron. It is also an important conference venue for Saxony and the Euroregion.
- The Nature Theatre (NaturTheater) lies in a woodland setting. It is the oldest open-air theatre in Saxony. In 2007 it was adapted to meet modern standards and reopened, offering a six-month season of opera, theatre, concerts and cinema.
- The 1892 Lutheran church of Holy Trinity (St.-Trinitatis-Kirche) was built in the Gothic Revival style. It contains artifacts from the previous building such as the Gothic statues of SS Peter and Paul from c. 1490.

== Twin town ==
- Bad Waldsee, from 1990

== Personalities ==
=== Sons and daughters of the town ===
- Klaus Ostwald (born 1958), GDR - ski jumper
- Heinz Wossipiwo (born 1951), GDR-ski jumper

=== Those associated with the site ===
- Robert Flechsig (1817–1892), first fountain and spa doctor in the Royal Saxon Staatsbad
- Hermann Richard Otto Knothe (1891–1961), painter and graphic artist, died there
- Walter Ferdinand Damm (1889–1961), a painter, lived and worked in Bad Elster, died there
