= Tax rates in Europe =

This is a list of the maximum potential tax rates around Europe for certain income brackets. It is focused on three types of taxes: corporate, individual, and value added taxes (VAT). It is not intended to represent the true tax burden to either the corporation or the individual in the listed country.

== Graphs ==
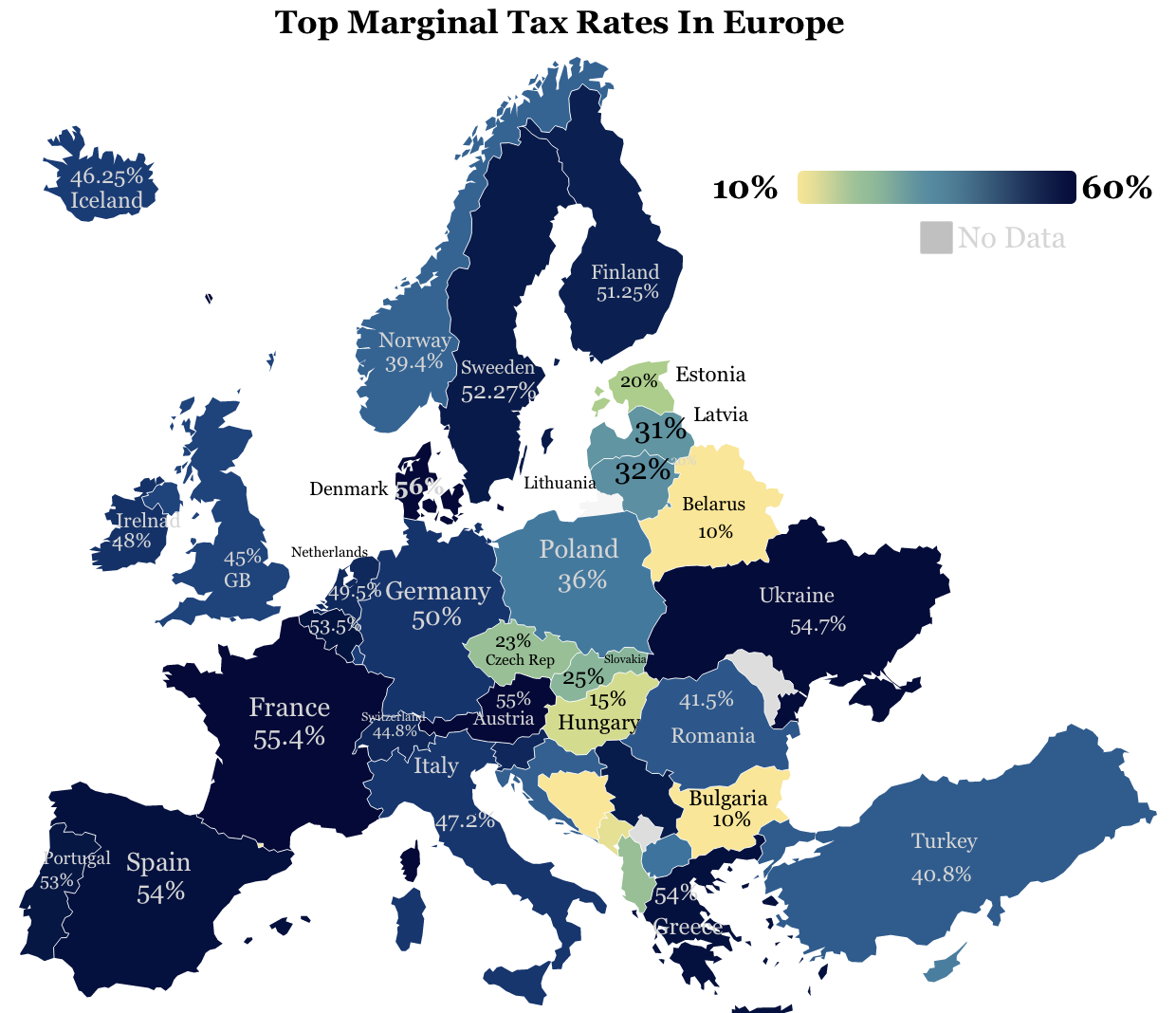
Top Marginal Tax Rates In Europe 2022

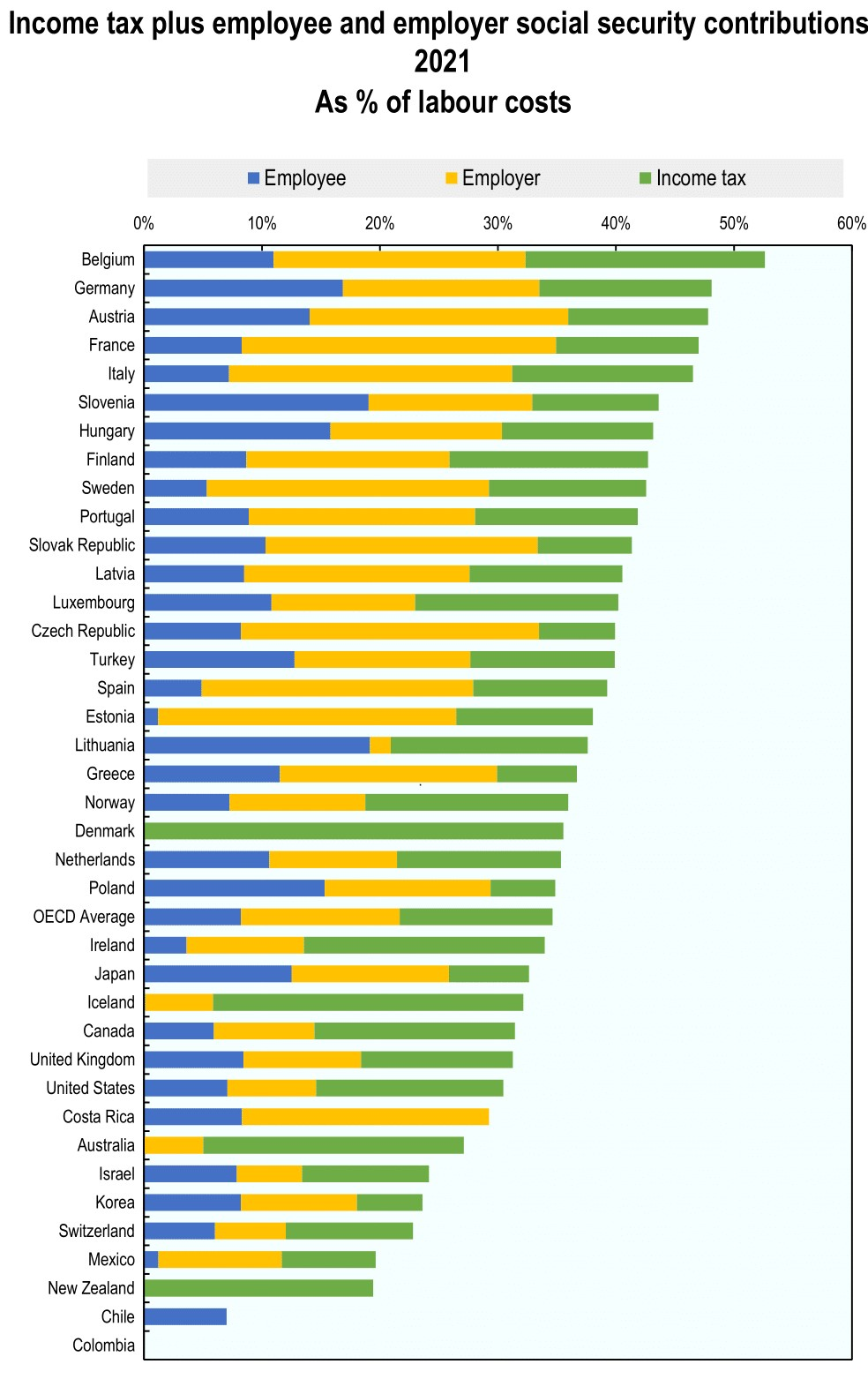
Payroll and income tax by OECD Country (2021)

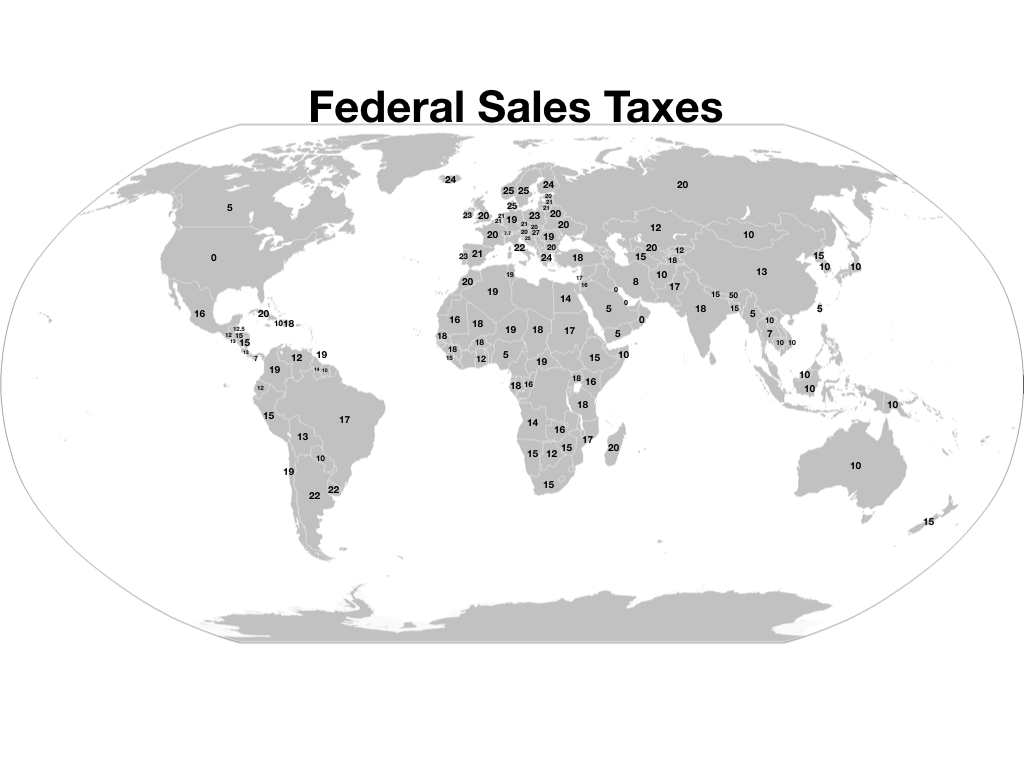
Federal Sales Taxes

== Summary list ==
The quoted income tax rate is, except where noted, the top rate of tax: most jurisdictions have lower rate of taxes for low levels of income. Some countries also have lower rates of corporation tax for smaller companies. In 1980, the top rates of most European countries were above 60%. Today most European countries have rates below 50%.

Country	Corporate tax	Maximum income tax rate	Standard VAT rate
Albania	15%	23%	20%
Andorra	10%	10%	4.5%
Armenia	18%	20% (plus 5% social contribution to pension system applicable for workers who are born after 1974, and plus fixed amount (up to 15 000 AMD, depending on income) contribution for the mandatory trust fund for military servicemen insurance)	20%
Austria	25%	55%	20% (Reduced rates 10% + 13%)
Belarus	18%	15%	20%
Belgium	25% (For SME's 20% from 2018 on the first €100,000 profit)	50% (excluding 13.07% social security paid by the employee and also excluding 32% social security paid by the employer)	21% (Reduced rates of 6% and 12%)
Bosnia and Herzegovina	10%	10%	17%
Bulgaria	10%	10% (excluding national insurance contribution rate (social security and health insurance) is 32.7% to 33.4%, of which 13.78% is payable by the employee and 18.92% to 19.62% is payable by the employer.	20% (Reduced rates 9%)
Croatia	18% (Reduced rate 10% for small business)	15% to 35,4% (depending on the income and municipality)	25% (Reduced rates 13% + 5%)(Reduced rates 9%)
Cyprus	15%	35%	19% (Reduced rates 5% + 9%)(Reduced rates 9%)
Czech Republic	21%	34% (15% or 23% tax, 4,5% health insurance, 6,5% social security) + additional payments by employer (11,5% healthcare, 24,8% social security)	21% (reduced rate 12%)
Denmark	22%	56% (avg commune) (including 8% social security paid by the employee but excluding 0.42–1.48% church tax imposed on members of the national Church of Denmark)	25% (reduced rate 0% on transportation of passengers and newspapers normally published at a rate of more than one issue per month)
Estonia	0% on undistributed profits. 20% CIT on distributed profit. 14% on regular distribution.	57.8% (20% income tax + 2.4% of unemployment insurance tax, 0.8% paid by employer, 1.6% paid by employee and 33% social security which is paid before gross wage by employer), around 57,8% in total	22% (reduced rate 9%)
Finland	20%	67% to 25% depending on the net income and municipality, including 7.8% social insurance fees, employee unemployment payment and employer unemployment payment, which is on average 18% (2018).	25.5% (reduced rate of 14% for groceries and restaurants, 10% for books, medicine, transport of passengers and some others)
France	30% (including social contributions) after 2018 ('PFU'), before: 33.3% (36.6% above €3.5M, 15% below €38k)	49% (45% +4% for annual incomes above €250,000 for single taxpayers or above €500,000 for married couples) + social security and social contribution taxes at various rates, for example 17,2 % for capital gains, interests and dividends.	20% (reduced rate of 10%, 5.5%, 2.1% and 0% for specific cases like some food, transportation, cultural goods, etc.)
Germany	22.825% (few small villages) to 32.925% (in Munich) depending on the municipality. This includes the 15% CIT, 5.5% solidarity surcharge plus the trade tax payable to the municipality.	47.475% which includes 45% income tax and 5.5% solidarity surcharge based on the total tax bill for incomes above €256,304. The entry tax rate is 14% for incomes exceeding the basic annual threshold of €9,000.	19% (reduced rate of 7% applies e.g. on sales of certain foods, books and magazines, flowers and transports)
Georgia	15%		18%
Greece	24%	65.67% (45% for >€40,000+ 7.5% Solidarity Tax for >€40000)+(26.95% Social Security for employees or up to 47.95% for private professionals)	24% (Reduced rates 13% and 5%)
Hungary	9%	Total: 43.16% Employee: 33.5% of gross salary (Employee expenses altogether of gross salary without children: 15% Income Tax (flat), Social Security: 10% Pension, 3% in cash + 4% in kind healthcare, 1.5% Labor Market contributions) Employer: 17% in addition to gross salary (15.5% Social Tax, 1.5% Training Fund Contribution)	27% (Reduced rates 18% and 5%)
Iceland	20%	36.94% from 0 - 834.707 and 46.24% over 834.707 kr (2017)	24% (12% reduced rate)
Ireland	12.5% for trading income 25% for non-trading income	40% over €40,000 for single, €49,000 for married taxpayers.Plus USC(Universal Social Charge)4.5% on income up to €70,044 and 8% on balance. Social insurance 4%	23%
Isle of Man	0%	20% plus national insurance of under 12.8%	Same as United Kingdom (see below)
Italy	27.9% (24% plus 3.9% municipal)	45.83% (43% maximum income tax + 2.03% regional income tax + 0.8% municipal income tax)	22% (Reduced rates 10%, 5%, 4%)
Latvia	20% CIT on distributed profit. 0% on undistributed profits. 15% on small businesses	20%(income tax) 35.09%(social insurance) Total up to 55.09%	21% (reduced rates 12% and 0%)
Liechtenstein	12.5%	28% (max. 8% national and 20% municipal income tax) plus 4% of the taxpayer's net worth is subject to the same rate as wealth tax. 0% on capital gains.	8% / 2.5% (till 31.12.2017) 7.7% / 2.5% (from 01.01.2018)
Lithuania	15% (5% for small businesses)	44.27% (effective tax rates: 34.27% social insurance (nominally it is 1.77% payable by employer + 19.5% payable by employee + from 1.8% to 3% optional accumulation of pence), 20% income	21% (Reduced rates 5%, 9%)
Luxembourg	24.94% (commercial activity); 5.718% on intellectual property income, royalties.	45.78% (42% income tax + 9% solidarity surcharge calculated on the income tax)	17% (Reduced rates 3%, 8%, 14%)
Malta	35% (6/7 or 5/7 tax refunds gives an effective rate of 5% or 10% for most companies)	35% (additional 10% by the employee for social security contributions, i.e. health insurance, pension and education); and additional 10% by the employer for various social security contributions)	18% (Reduced rates 5%, 7% and 0% for life necessities – groceries, water, prescription medications, medical equipment and supplies, public transport, children's education fees)
Monaco	0% (>75% revenue within Monaco) or 33.33%		
Moldova	12% or 7% for IT businesses		
Montenegro	9%	12.65% (11% income tax + 15% of the income tax bill to the municipality)	21%
Netherlands	19% for the first €200.000 of profit, 25,8% for the rest.	49.5% (excluding income dependent bracket discount for incomes up to €132,920)	21% (reduced rate of 9% and 0% for some goods and services)
North Macedonia	10%	37% (includes income tax 10%, mandatory state pension 18%, mandatory public health insurance 7.3%, mandatory unemployment insurance 1.2%, mandatory personal injury insurance 0.5%)	18%
Norway	22%	46.4% (53.0% including 14.1% social security contribution by employer. All taxes include 8.2% pension fund payments).	25% (reduced rate of 15% for groceries, and 10% for transport and culture.)
Poland	19% (Reduced rate 9% for small business since 01.01.2019)	12% up to 120 000 PLN (from 1.07.2022) minus tax-reducing amount of 3600 PLN 32% above 120 000 PLN, with 10,800 PLN for the first 120 000 PLN + 32% of the excess over 120 000 PLN 36% on the surplus above 1,000,000 PLN of total taxable income Pension insurance: 9.76% of the salary base (half of the total 19.52%, with the other half paid by the employer). Disability insurance: 1.5% of the salary base (the remaining 6.5% is paid by the employer). Sickness insurance: 2.45% of the salary base, fully paid by the employee. Health insurance: 9% of the salary base, fully paid by the employee. The annual assessment base for retirement and disability insurance contributions in a given calendar year may not exceed the amount corresponding to thirty times the forecasted average monthly salary in the national economy for that calendar year. In 2024, 234,720.00 PLN - the amount of the annual limit for the base.	23% (reduced rates of 5% and 8%)
Portugal	21% + 3 to 9% depending on profit	48% + 5% solidarity surcharge + 11% social security (paid by the employee) + 23,75% (social security paid by the company)	23% (reduced rates 13% and 6%)
Romania	Revenue <€100.000 & at least one employee: 1% of all sales + 16% on dividends Revenue >€100.000 or no employee: 16% on profit + 16% on dividends	Employee: 41.5% [10% income tax (out of gross minus pension & health deductions), 25% pension contribution (out of gross), 10% health contribution (out of gross)] - Gross incomes below RON 3,600 benefit from personal deductions of up to RON 1,310 from taxable income. Employer: 2.25% (compulsory work insurance)	21% (reduced rates of 9% and 5%)
Russia	20%	43% (13.0% income tax, 22.0% mandatory pension fund contribution, 2.9% unemployment insurance, 5.1% mandatory universal health insurance)	20%
Serbia	15%	52% (capital gains tax 15%, standard income tax rate 10%, additional contributions by employee: 13% state pension fund, 6.5% state health fund, 0.5% unemployment fund; additional contributions by employer: 11% state pension fund, 6.5% state health fund, 0.5% unemployment; maximum contributions capped (amount changing monthly); additional tax for higher salaries (after 3 times average salary additional 10%, after 6 times average salary additional 15%)),	20% (10% reduced rate)
Slovakia	21%	50% (income tax 19% + 25% for the part of annual income greater than €35,022.31; additional contributions at 4% mandatory health insurance by employee and 10% by employer, 9.4% Social Security by employee and 25.2% by employer)	23% (reduced rates of 19%, 5% and 0% for selected services)
Slovenia	19%	50%	22% (reduced rate 9.5%) – from 1 July 2013
Spain	25% 4% in the Canary Islands	45% maximum Income tax rate. Not including employee contribution of 6.35% Social Security tax, 4.7% pension contribution tax, 1.55% unemployment tax, 0.1% worker training tax. Not including employer contribution of 23.6% Social security tax, 5.5% unemployment tax, 3.5% (or more) workers comp tax, worker training tax .06%, 0.2% FOGASA tax (employment tax in case of company bankruptcy).	21% (reduced rates 10% and 4%)
Sweden	20.6%	55.5% (Not including payroll taxes of 31.42%)	25% (reduced rates 12% and 6%)
Switzerland	16.55%	22.5% (Kanton Zug, Gemeinde Walchwil) to 46% (Kanton Geneve), average rate 34%. These taxes do not include social security that is private and not income based (e. )	8% / 2.5% (till 31.12.2017) 7.7% / 2.5% (from 01.01.2018 until 31.12.2023); 8.1% / 2.6% (from 01.01.2024)
Ukraine	18%	41.5% (Income tax 18%, military tax 1.5%, social contribution tax 22%)	20%
United Kingdom	25% (19% for total profits of <£250,000)	47% (45% income tax + 2% National Insurance). Not including Employer's National Insurance payroll tax of 13.8%. In Scotland, the top marginal rate is 50% (48% income tax + 2% NI). For earnings between £100,000 - £125,140 employees pay the 40% higher rate income tax + removal of tax-free personal allowance + 2% NI (effectively a 67% marginal rate). The top tax rate on dividend income is 39.35%. Capital gains top tax rates are 20% for securities and 28% on property gains. National Insurance is not charged on property income so it is only liable to Income Tax at 45% above £125,140.	20% (reduced rate of 5% for home energy and renovations, 0% for life necessities – groceries, water, prescription medications, medical equipment and supplies, public transport, children's clothing, books and periodicals)

== Per country information: income tax bands ==
=== Austria ===
Austrian income taxation is determined by §33 of Austrian Income Tax Code (Einkommensteuergesetz - EStG)

Annual Income [€]	Taxation Rate [%]
0 - 12,816	0
12,816 - 20,818	20
20,818 - 34,513	30
34,513 - 66,612	41
66,612 - 99,266	48
99,266 - 1,000,000	50
>1,000,000	55

Until the end of the year 2024 an additional tax (55%) will affect income of over 1 million €.Source

=== Belgium ===
Annual Income [€]	Taxation Rate [%]
0 – 9050	0
9050 – 22590	25
22590 – 32950	40
32950 – 50410	45
>50410	50

=== Croatia ===
Annual income [€]	Tax Rate
Less than 47,780.21	20
More than 47,780.21	30

=== Finland ===
The total Finnish income tax includes the income tax dependable on the net salary, employee unemployment payment, and employer unemployment payment. The tax rate increases very progressively rapidly at 13 ke/year (from 25% to 48%) and at 29 ke/year to 55% and eventually reaches 67% at 83 ke/year, while little decreases at 127 ke/year to 65%. The middle-income person will get 44 euros from every 100 euros the employer puts on the work. The GP will then again get from every extra 100 euros that the employer puts on the work only 33 euros. Some sources do not include the employer unemployment payment, for instance Veronmaksajat -organisation. (Neither do stated tax rates for other countries mentioned here.)

Annual income at	Tax rate (including employer unemployment payment)
€13,000	25%
€33,000	57%
€47,000	60%
€83,000	67%
€94,000	66%
€127,000	65%

=== France ===
Income tax in France depends on the number of people in the household. The taxable income is divided by the number of persons belonging to the household. Each adult counts as one person while the first two children count as half each. From the third child onwards each child counts as one person. Therefore, a household comprising 2 adults and 3 children is considered to be a household of 4 persons for tax purposes.

The rates below do not include the 17% social security contributions.

Annual income above	Annual income below	Tax rate
€0	€5,963	0%
€5,963	€11,896	5.5%
€11,896	€26,420	14%
€26,420	€70,830	30%
€70,830	-	41%

=== Germany ===
German income tax comprises 5 income tax bands, with the first two being based on a totally Progressive tax rate and the rest being flat rate. Taxable income is derived after subtracting personal and child allowances from earned income. In addition a number of other deductions may be claimed by German taxpayers.

- Personal allowance: €9,000 per adult
- Child allowance: €7,428 per child

Annual income above	Annual income below	Marginal tax rate 2018
€0	€9,000	0%
€9,000	€13,996	14% − 23.97%
€13,996	€54,949	23.97% − 42%
€54,949	€260,532	42%
€260,532	-	45%

In Germany, married couples are taxed jointly. This means that the tax liability for the couple is twice the amount resulting from the tariff when inserting the average income of both spouses. Due to the progressive tariff, filing jointly uniformly reduces the total tax burden if spouses' incomes differ.

=== Italy ===
- Personal Allowance: €800 per adult
- Allowance per child: €1,120

Annual income Above	Annual income below	Tax rate
€0	€15,000	23%
€15,000	€28,000	27%
€28,000	€55,000	38%
€55,000	€75,000	41%
€75,000	-	43%

=== Netherlands ===
Income tax in the Netherlands (Inkomstenbelasting, Box 1) and social security contributions are combined in one payroll tax. There are no personal tax-free allowances; however, there are personal and labor tax credits that reduce the amount of income tax paid.

Prior to 2020, the income tax was assessed within four brackets, which have been simplified to just three (effectively two) as of 2020. As of 2026, the income tax rates are:

Annual income above	Annual income below	Tax rate (including employee social security)
€0	€38,883	35.75%*
€38,883	€78,426	37.56%*
€78,426	-	49.50%*

- Income-dependent deductions and tax credits apply to incomes up to €132,920. Maximum effective marginal tax rate for employment is 49.5+6.510 = 56.01%. From €45,592 to €78,426 it is 37.56+6.398+6.510 = 50.465%.

=== Portugal ===
Income tax in Portugal depends on a number of factors, including regional (different tax rates depending if you live in the mainland, the Azores or Madeira regions, marital status and number of dependents.

For simplification purposes, the following is a summary of the major tax brackets.

Taxable Income	Tax Rate (Mainland)	Tax Rate (Madeira)	Tax Rate (Azores)
Up to €7,091	14.5%	11.6%	10.15%
€7,091 and €10,700	23%	20.7%	17.25%
€10,700 and €20,261	28.5%	26.5%	21.38%
€20,261 and €25,000	35%	33.75%	28%
€25,000 and €36,856	37%	35.87%	29.6%
€36,856 and €80,640	45%	44.95%	36%
Above €80,640	48%	48%	38.4%

A solidarity additional tax of 2.5% is applied on income between €80,640 and €250,000. All income above €250,000 is taxed a further 5%.

=== Spain ===
Spanish income tax includes a personal tax free allowance and an allowance per child. In 2012 a special temporary surcharge was introduced as part of austerity measures to balance the budget. The personal allowance currently stands at €5,151.

- 1st child €1,836
- 2nd child €2,040
- 3rd child €3,672
- 4th & subs €4,182

Annual income above	Annual income below	Tax rate (excluding temporary surcharge)	Tax rate (including temporary surcharge)
€0	€5,150	0%	0%
€5,150	€17,707.20	24%	24.75%
€17,707.20	€33,007.20	28%	30%
€33,007.20	€53,407.20	37%	40%
€53,407.20	€120,000.20	43%	47%
€120,000.20	€175,000.20	44%	49%
€175,000.20	€300,000.20	45%	51%
€300,000.20	-	47%	52%

=== United Kingdom ===
Income tax for the United Kingdom is based on 2023/24 tax bands. The current tax free threshold on earnings is £12,570. The relief is tapered by £1 for every £2 earned over £100,000, resulting in an effective 60% tax rate for incomes between £100,000 and £125,140.

Annual income		Tax rate
Above	Up to	Tax rate
£0	£12,570	0%
£12,570	£50,270	20%
£50,270	£125,140	40%
£125,140	—	45%

== See also ==
- List of countries by tax revenue as percentage of GDP
- VAT rates
- Tax Freedom Day
- Tax haven
- Tax rates around the world

== Sources ==
- FITA Country Profiles
