= Bad Elster Spa Museum =

Museum in Germany

Coordinates: 50°16′51″N 12°14′22″E

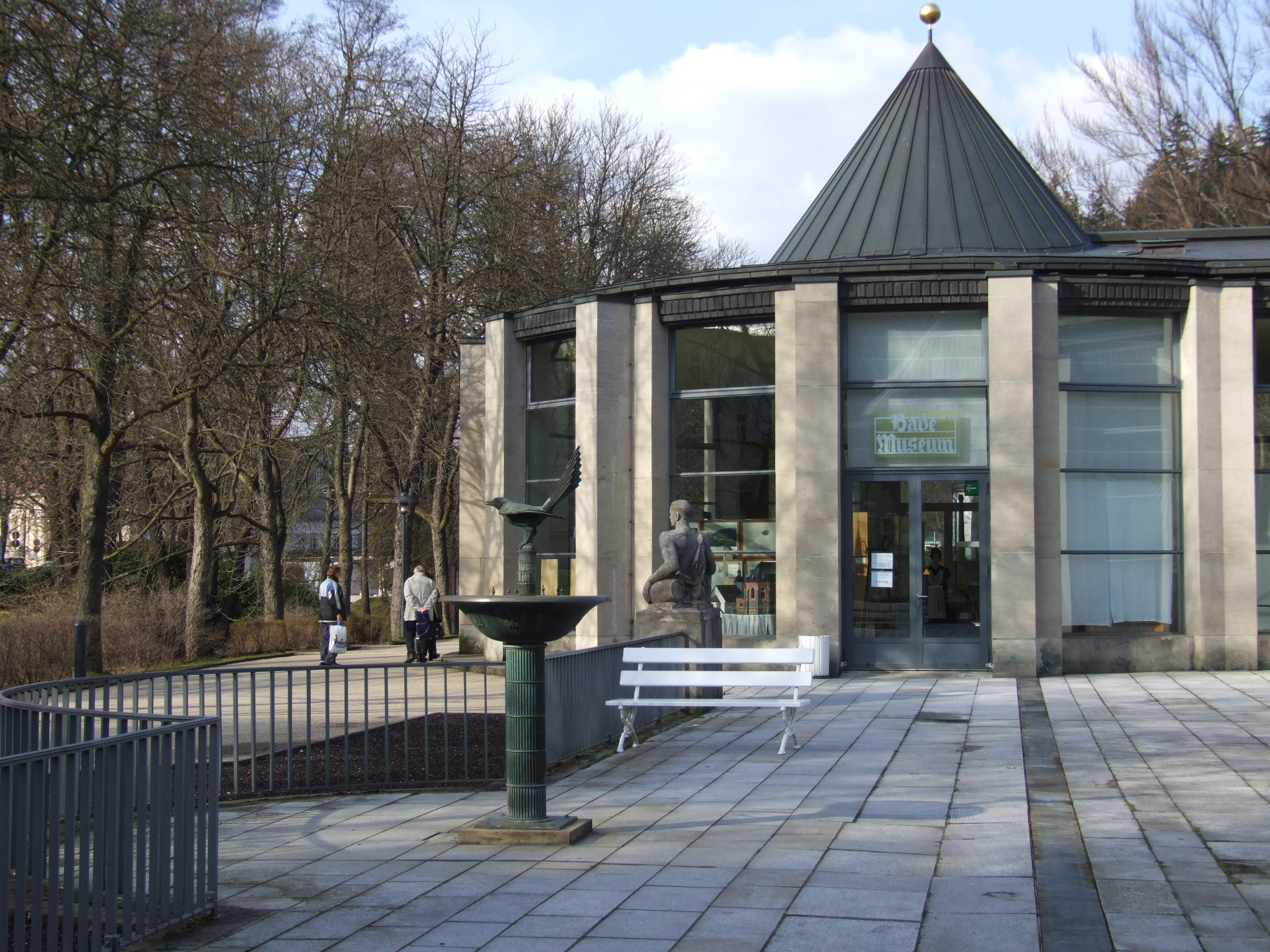
The magpie, the symbol of Bad Elster in front of the Bademuseum

Spa Museum, Bad Elster, Saxony

The first Spa Museum (Bademuseum) in Bad Elster, Saxony was opened in 1880 due to the work of Prof. Dr. Robert Flechsig (1817–1892), Bernhard v. Heygendorff (1843–1916) and the Royal Saxony court photographer Emil Tietze (1840–1831). It soon closed. After World War 2, Dr. Bruno Rudau (1891–1970) and a few other Bad Elster citizens created a new museum which suffered the same fate.

In 1993 it was created again under the title of the Saxon Spa Museum, Bad Elster, (Sächsischen Bademuseum Bad Elster). In the museum art gallery there is a permanent display of the history of the spa towns of Bad Elster and Bad Brambach and taking the waters. The museum also holds the town's art collection.
