= C. A. Elster Building =

- U.S. National Register of Historic Places
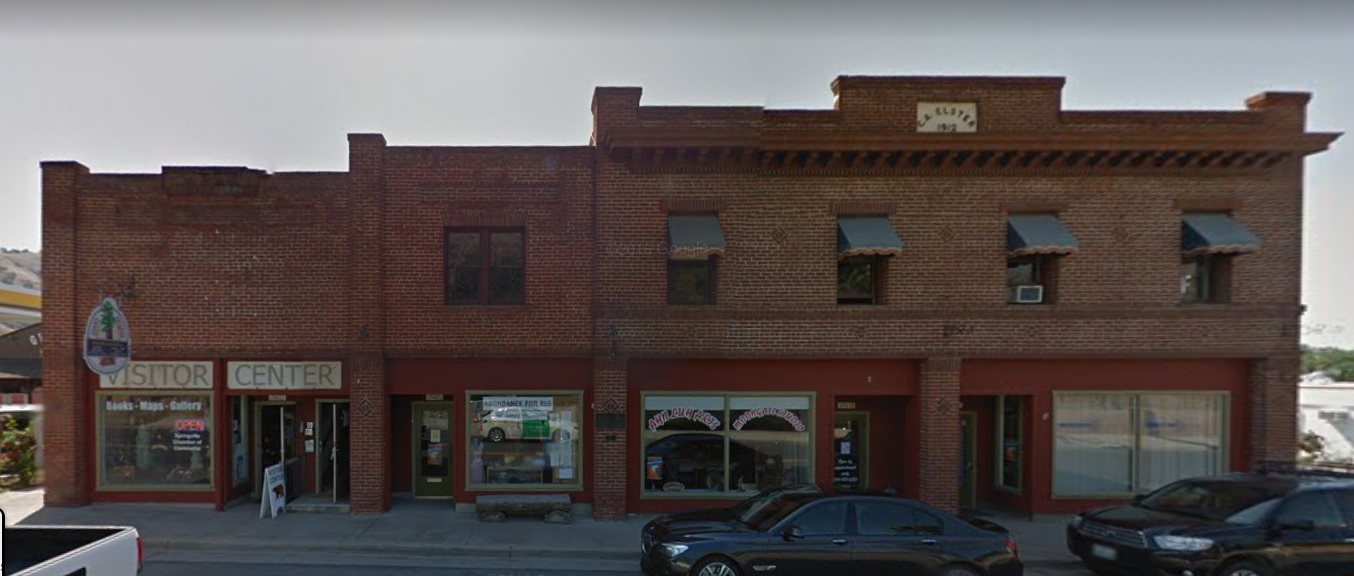

- Location within California Location within the United States
- Location: CA 190 and Tule River Dr., Springville, California
- Coordinates: 36°7′50″N 118°48′59″W
- Area: 0.3 acres (0.12 ha)
- Built: 1912
- NRHP reference No.: 82002279
- Added to NRHP: March 25, 1982

The C. A. Elster Building is a historic commercial building located at the corner of California State Route 190 and Tule River Dr. in Springville, California.

== Description and history ==
The brick building was built in 1912 by Charles Alonzo Elster, a significant businessman in the area. When it opened, the building contained several of Springville's main businesses, including its post office, a bank, a drugstore, the Odd Fellows hall, and the town's first telephone. The second floor of the building was used for residences, and the basement contained Springville's first ice plant.

The building was added to the National Register of Historic Places on March 25, 1982.
