= Kristian Elster (born 1841) =

Norwegian novelist, journalist, literary critic and theatre critic

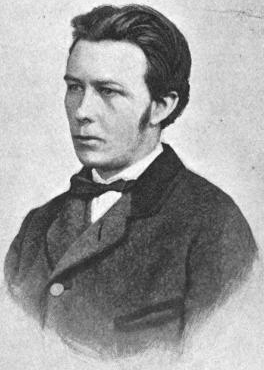
Kristian Elster d.e.

Kristian Mandrup Elster (4 March 1841 – 11 April 1881) was a Norwegian novelist, journalist, literary critic and theatre critic.

== Biography ==
He was born at Overhalla Municipality in Nordre Trondheim, Norway. He was the son of Christen Christensen Elster (1804–1891) and Elen Sophie Alstrup (1811–1889). In 1853 the family moved to Førde Municipality in Sunnfjord. At age 15, he was sent to Christiania to attend school. In 1867, he traveled to Germany to receive training as a forester at Giessen. From 1869 to 1873, he lived in Christiania where he work as a literary and theater critic. From 1873, he was employed as a forester first in Valdres and then in Trondheim where he resided until he died of pneumonia in 1881 at age 40.

He was married in 1874 to Sanna Fasting (1845–1926) and was the father of Kristian Elster the Younger (1881–1947). He made his literary début with the historical drama Eystein Meyla, which was staged in 1863. Among his novels are Tora Trondal from 1879, and Farlige folk from 1881.

== Selected works ==
- Tora Trondal, 1879
- Farlige Folk, 1881
- Solskyer, 1881
- Samlede Skrifterbd. 1–2, 1898
