= Kristian Elster (born 1881) =

Norwegian novelist, literary historian, theatre critic and biographer

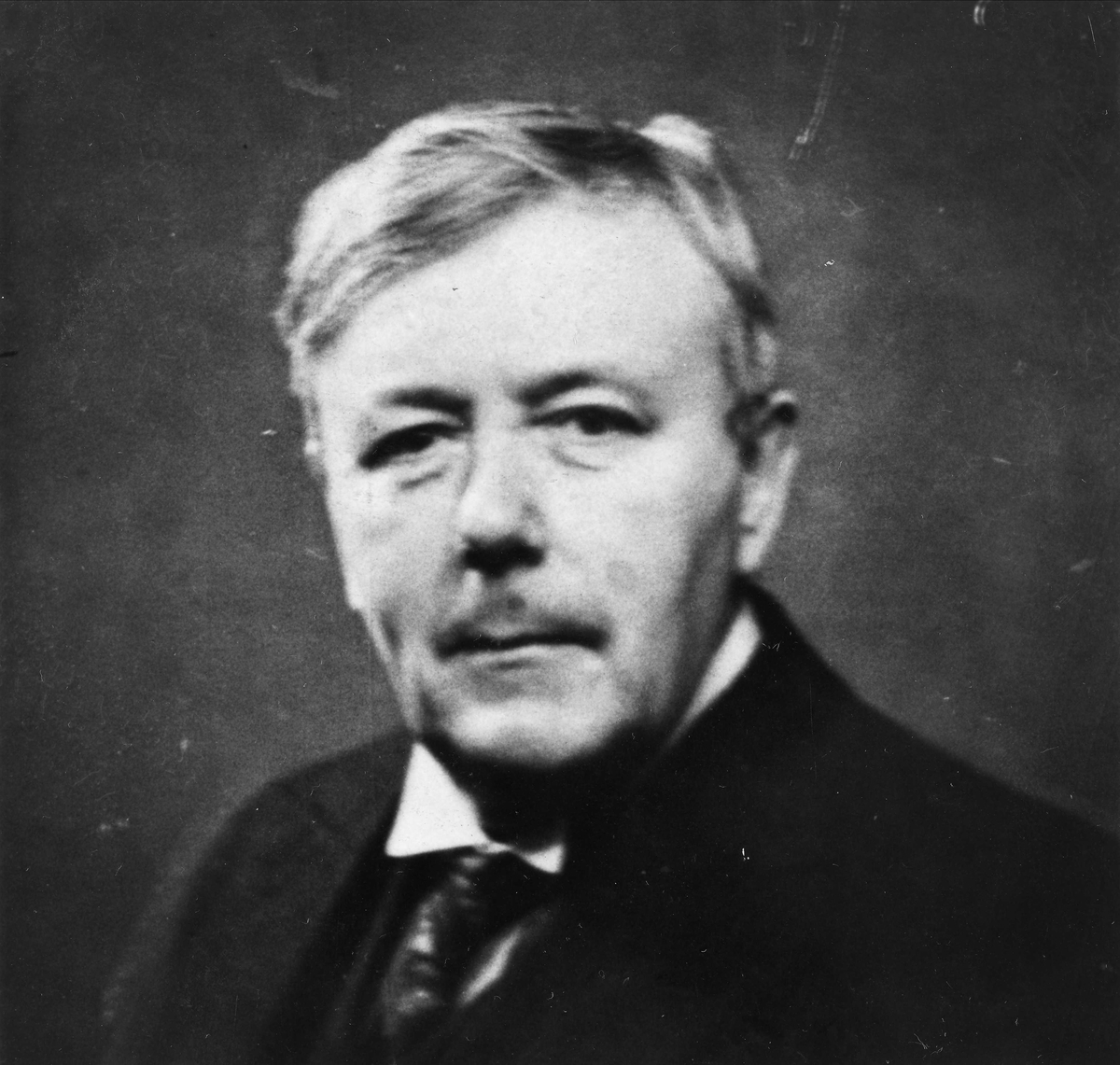
- Elster, ca. 1935
- Born: 17 March 1881; Trondheim, Norway
- Died: 6 November 1947 (aged 66)
- Occupations: novelist, literary historian, theatre critic, and biographer
- Children: Torolf Elster
- Father: Kristian Elster, Sr.

Kristian Elster (17 March 1881 – 6 November 1947) was a Norwegian novelist, literary historian, theatre critic, and biographer.

== Biography ==
Kristian Elster was born in Trondheim, Norway on 17 March 1881 as the son of the author Kristian Elster (1841–1881) and Sanna Fasting (1845–1926). In 1888, he moved with his mother to Kristiania. He married Ragnhild Poulsen in 1920, and was the father of Torolf Elster.

He was educated as a lawyer, and in 1908 he became a secretary in the Ministry of Agriculture.

Elster published 40 novels, plays, and narratives. He made his literary début in 1907 with the story collection Fortællinger. His literary breakthrough was the trilogy of novels I lære (1911), Landeveien (1912) and Mester (1913). He wrote the two-volume literary history Illustrert norsk litteraturhistorie, published in 1923–24.

In 1941, he was awarded the literature prize Gyldendal's Endowment (Gyldendals legat for norsk litteratur).

== Selected works ==
- Fjeldets fange; digte (1916)
- Fra tid til anden (1920)
- Den ensomme ø; en fortaelling om tre gutter (1921)

== Other sources ==
- Kielland, Eugenia Marie (1950) Min venn Kristian Elster (Oslo, Aschehoug)
