= Elster (German tax portal) =

ELSTER
- Website type: Government tax administration portal
- Available in: German
- Owner: Bayerisches Landesamt für Steuern
- Website: www.elster.de
- Commercial: No
- Registration: Required for authenticated submissions
- Launched: 1999

ELSTER is the official electronic tax administration portal of Germany. The name is an acronym of Elektronische Steuererklärung ("electronic tax declaration"). The system is used for the electronic submission of tax returns to the German tax authorities.

It's a joint e-government project of the German federal tax administration and the Bavarian State Tax Office. It is used by private individuals, employers, businesses, associations, tax advisers and software providers.

Its web service "Mein ELSTER" allows users to complete and submit tax forms such as for income tax and value-added tax.

== History ==
ELSTER was first launched as the official system for the electronic transmission of income tax returns in 1999. It subsequently expanded to support wage tax, value-added tax, trade tax and corporate tax filings. In 2005 the ElsterOnline portal was launched. In 2014 the function of pre-filled tax return was added.

== Services ==
Mein ELSTER is the main web-based service for completing and submitting tax returns. Its “pre-filled” feature allows users to retrieve information already held by the tax administration. Users can also import data from previous tax returns.

At the start of an income-tax return, users can choose the Anlagenassistent ("annex assistant"), an optional questionnaire about personal circumstances, income and expenses. It selects the relevant supplementary forms (Anlagen), allowing users to skip those that do not apply.

Before submitting tax return, the service checks entries for plausibility. Users can also submit supporting documents, send messages to the tax office and request filing extensions.

Once tax assessment data are available, results can compare them with estimation from submitted tax return. It's also possible to lodge objections to tax assessment (Einsprüche).

=== Simplified tax filing ===
The system offers additional web services for specific user groups; einfachELSTER is a simplified service for pensioners, while einfachELSTERplus is a guided interface for employees.

=== MeinELSTER+ app ===
The MeinELSTER+ mobile app allows users to photograph receipts and upload them for use in the tax return. In July 2026, the app added a "one-click" service. It prepares a return from information already held by the tax administration, which users can review and submit.

== Authentication ==
ELSTER supports several login options, including the ElsterSecure mobile app and a certificate file ELSTER-Zertifikat. With ElsterSecure, users scan a QR code and confirm their identity using the device's facial recognition, fingerprint or PIN, without requiring a certificate file.

== See also ==
- Tax return in Germany
- Income tax in Germany
