= Gedde =

Gedde is a surname. Notable people with this surname include:

- Caroline Gedde-Dahl (born 1973), Norwegian alpine skier
- Christian Gedde (1729-1798), Danish cartographer, known for Gedde's maps of Copenhagen
- Dagfinn Gedde-Dahl (1937–2016), Norwegian physician
- Dietmar Gedde (born 1936), German sailor
- Nicolai Wilhelm Gedde (1779-1833), Danish officer
- Tobias Gedde-Dahl (1903–1994), Norwegian physician
- Walter Gedde, English designer

== As given name ==
- Gedde Watanabe (born 1955), American actor and comedian

== Fictional characters ==
- Malia Gedde, from Gabriel Knight
