= Ustvedt =

Ustvedt is a Norwegian surname. Notable people with the surname include:

- Hans Jacob Ustvedt (1903–1982), Norwegian resistance member
- Nils Yngvar Ustvedt (1868–1938), Norwegian politician
- Yngvar Ustvedt (1928–2007), Norwegian writer
