= Martinsen =

Martinsen is a surname. Notable people with the surname include:

- Alf Martinsen, known as "Kaka" (1911–1988), Norwegian football (soccer) player
- Andreas Martinsen (born 1990), Norwegian ice hockey player
- Andreas Martinsen (athlete) (born 1990), Danish athlete specialising in the sprint hurdles
- Astrid Murberg Martinsen (1932–1991), Norwegian politician
- Bente Martinsen, also known as Bente Skari (born 1972), Norwegian former cross-country skier
- Gustav Martinsen (1843–1920), Norwegian industrial leader and politician
- Haavard Martinsen (1879–1967), Norwegian chemist and industrial leader
- Ivar Martinsen (1920–2018), Norwegian speed skater
- Kari Martinsen (born 1943), Norwegian nurse and academic
- Karl Martinsen, sometimes spelled Karl Marthinsen (1896–1945), Norwegian commander of Statspolitiet
- Knud Børge Martinsen (1905–1949), Danish officer
- Odd Martinsen (1942–2025), Norwegian cross-country skier
- Ole Einar Martinsen (born 1967), Norwegian football defender
- Petter Martinsen (1887–1972), Norwegian gymnast
- Ragnvald Martinsen (1906–1987), Norwegian cyclist
- Rasmus Martinsen (born 1996), Norwegian footballer
- Sven Martinsen (1900–1968), Norwegian sport wrestler
- Thor Martinsen, known as "Mr Frisk" (born 1945) is a Norwegian ice hockey player
- Vidar Martinsen (born 1982), Norwegian footballer
- Ylva Martinsen, also known as Ylva Lindberg (born 1976), Swedish retired ice hockey player
