= Henrik Mohn =

Norwegian astronomer and meteorologist

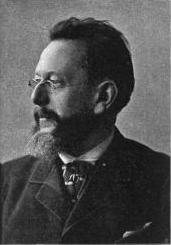
- Born: 15 May 1835; Bergen, Norway
- Died: 12 September 1916 (aged 81); Christiania, Norway
- Education: Royal Frederick University
- Notable work: Om Vind og Veir. Meteorologiens Hovedresultater; Études sur les mouvements de l'atmosphère
- Scientific career
- Fields: astronomy meteorology
- Workplaces: Royal Frederick University; Norwegian Meteorological Institute

Henrik Mohn (15 May 1835 – 12 September 1916) was a Norwegian astronomer and meteorologist. Although he enrolled in theology studies after finishing school, he is credited with founding meteorological research in Norway, being a professor at the Royal Frederick University and director of the Norwegian Meteorological Institute from 1866 to 1913.

== Personal life ==
He was born in Bergen as the son of Albert Henrik Mohn and Ida Neumann. He was a brother of Jakob and Emanuel Mohn. On the maternal side, he was a grandson of bishop Jacob Neumann.

He was married twice. In December 1863 he married Louise Nicoline Rieck. After she died, he married Julie Birgitte Dyblie in July 1871. He was a granduncle of Frank and Albert Henrik Mohn, and his niece Hanna married physician and politician Nils Yngvar Ustvedt.

== Career ==
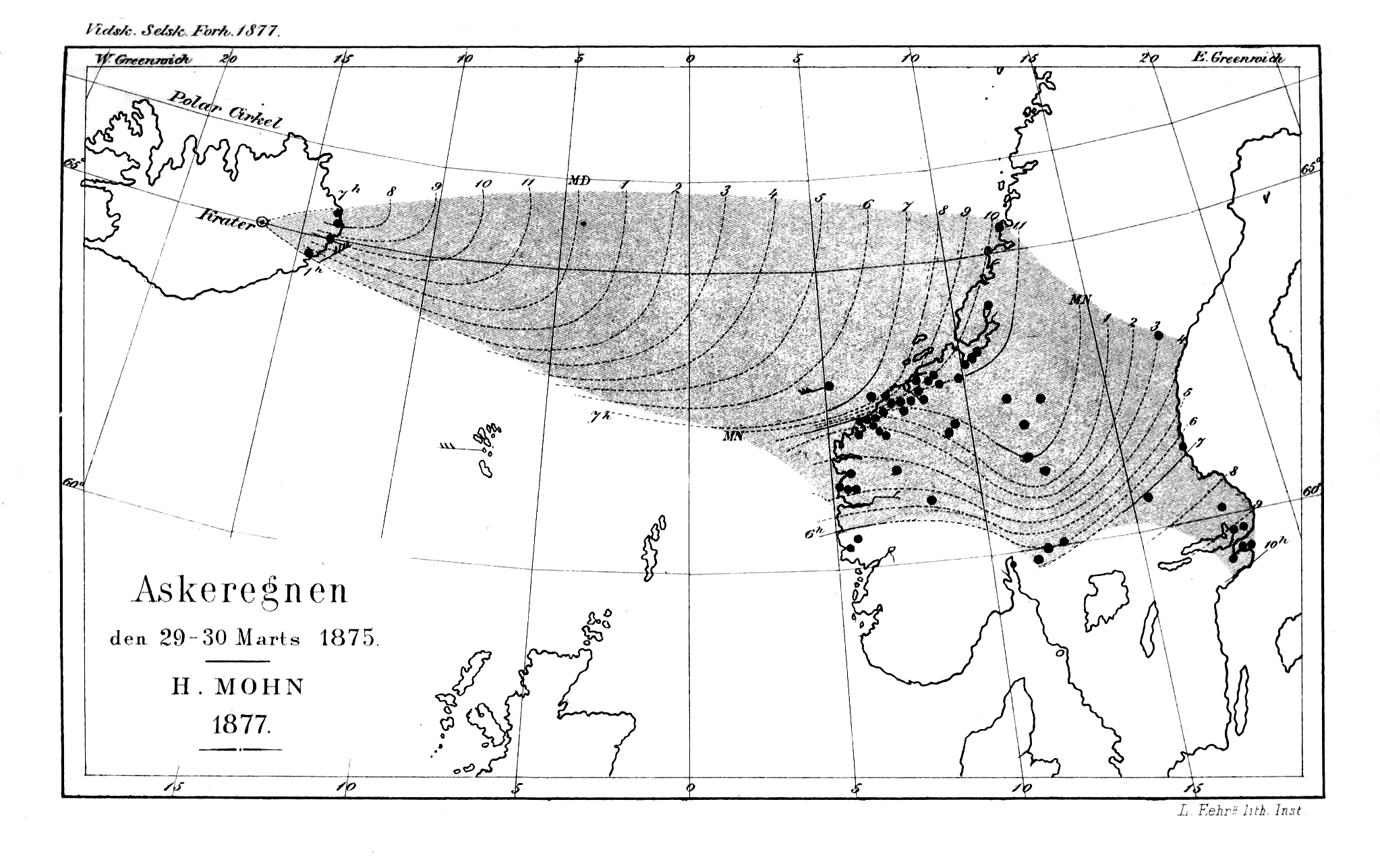
48 hours time span volcanic ash distribution from Iceland to Scandinavia in 1875 (H. Mohn, 1877)

He finished his secondary education at Bergen Cathedral School in 1852, and then enrolled at the Royal Frederick University. He originally studied theology, then switched to physics after attending lectures in that subject. He continued to study astronomy and mineralogy, graduating in the latter subject in 1858. To facilitate learning, he built his own telescope. In 1860 he was hired as a research fellow of astronomy, having delivered an esteemed paper on the orbits of comets in the same year. In 1861, when long-time professor Christopher Hansteen retired from an active academic career, Mohn became the new manager of the city astronomical observatory.

In this position, he soon became interested in meteorology. His first article in the field, Stormene i Christiania fra 1837 til 1863 was published in 1863 in the journal Polyteknisk Tidsskrift, which he had edited from 1859 to 1862. He helped found the Norwegian Meteorological Institute in 1866, and became its director from the start. At the same time he was appointed as a professor at the Royal Frederick University. One of his more important works, Om Vind og Veir. Meteorologiens Hovedresultater, was published in 1872 and translated into seven languages. His main work was Études sur les mouvements de l'atmosphère, written between 1876 and 1880 together with mathematician Cato Maximilian Guldberg. In it, they used hydrodynamics and thermodynamics to describe and explain meteorological phenomena. Mohn had participated in the North Sea Expedition from 1876 to 1878. In addition to conducting research, he took up an interest he had pursued in his youth: amateur painting. A painting of the island Jan Mayen was later used for a 1957 stamp issued in Norway.

In his later career, Mohn published annual climate tables. He published a climate atlas in 1916, after he retired from his positions at the university and the Meteorological Institute in 1913.

== Recognition and legacy ==
Mohn was a member of the Norwegian Academy of Science and Letters from 1861, and the Royal Norwegian Society of Sciences and Letters from 1870. In the Norwegian Academy he was a praeces and vice praeces (alternating) between 1896 and 1914. In 1874 Henrik Mohn was elected as senior honorary member of the Royal Meteorological Society of London. He was a member of the council of the International Meteorological Organization between 1873 and 1910. He was decorated as a Commander, First Class of the Royal Norwegian Order of St. Olav in 1915, and held several foreign orders of knighthood. A Festschrift was planned together with the fiftieth anniversary of the Meteorological Institute, but cancelled due to Mohn's death in September 1916 in Kristiania. The Mona Islands in the Kara Sea were named after Henrik Mohn by Fridtjof Nansen, who published the first detailed maps of the Russian Arctic.

The Mohn Prize for Arctic research, a two-million NOK prize awarded by the Academia Borealis, the Norwegian Academy of Science, the Tromsø Research Foundation and Norway's Arctic University, is given biennially in honor of Henrik Mohn.

Academic offices
Preceded by position created	Director of the Norwegian Meteorological Institute; 1866–1913	Succeeded by Aksel Steen
