= Rolf Østbye =

Norwegian businessman

Rolf Østbye (17 April 1898 – 20 November 1979) was a Norwegian businessperson.

He was born in Kristiania as a son of rector Niels Johan Hagerup Østbye (1866–1952) and Johanne Elisabeth Mellbye (1873–1962). From 1923 to 1931 he was married to Reidun Berg (1899–1976), and from 1933 he was married to Ellen Martinsen (1904–1997), a granddaughter of Gustav Martinsen.

He worked in Ringnes Bryggeri, Lillehammer Bryggeri and Bjølsen Valsemølle at a young age, but took education as a chemical engineer. He was hired in Standard Telefon og Kabelfabrik in 1947, and became chief executive officer in 1949. In 1953 he was hired in Norsk Hydro, becoming Director-General (CEO) in 1956. He stayed in this position until 1966; after this he was chairman of the board from 1967 to 1970. From 1966 to 1973 he chaired the Norwegian Trade Council, which is now a part of Innovation Norway.

He was also a supervisory council member of Forsikringsaktieselskabet Norden.

Business positions
Preceded by Bjarne Eriksen	Director-general of Norsk Hydro; 1956–1966	Succeeded by Johan Berthin Holte
Preceded by	Chair of Norsk Hydro; 1967–1970	Succeeded by Erik Anker
