= Emanuel Mohn =

Norwegian educator, mountain climber and illustrator

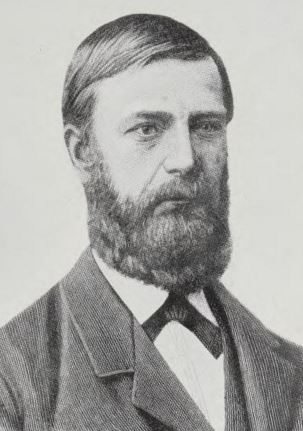
Emanuel Meyer Mohn

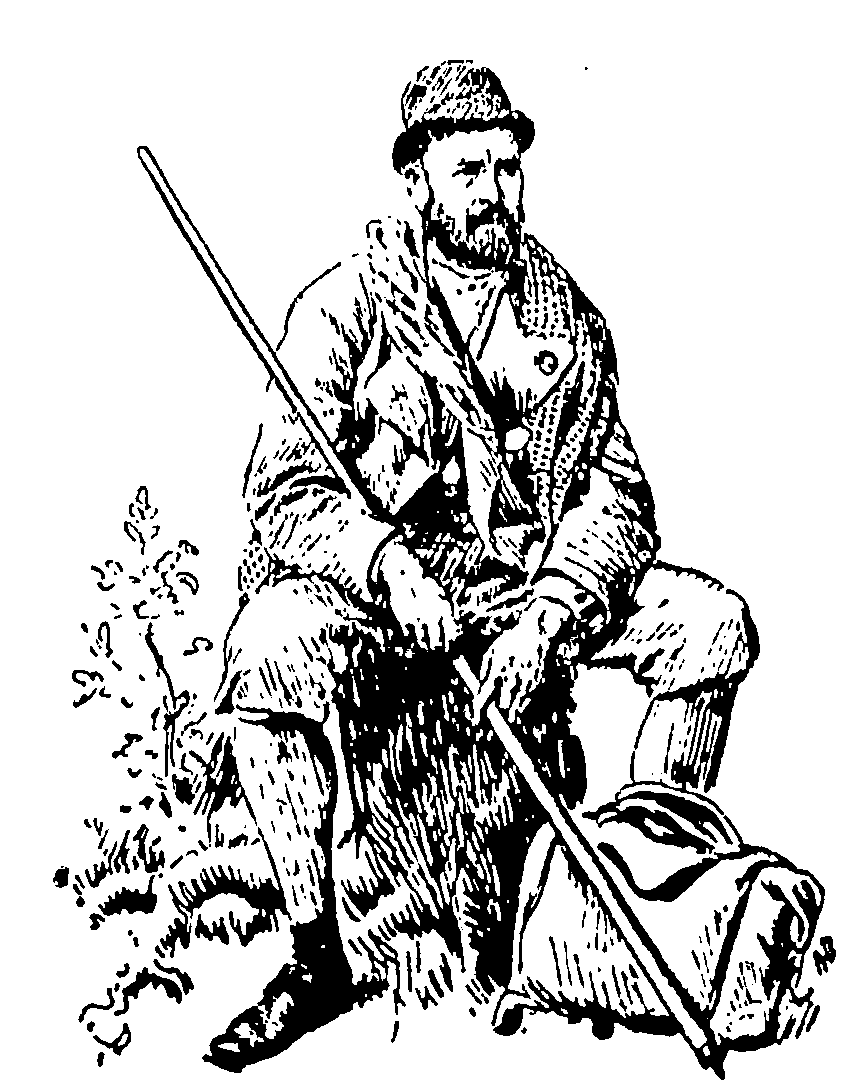
Portrait in Verdens Gang, 1891.

Emanuel Meyer Mohn (15 February 1842 – 26 April 1891) was a Norwegian educator, mountain climber and illustrator. He was known for writing about and illustrating mountains in Norway. He is credited with popularizing mountaineering.He committed suicide by drowning in April 1891 in Utne.

== Biography ==
He was born in Bergen to Albert Henrik Mohn (1811–1894) and Ida Neumann (1814–1864). He was a brother of Henrik and Jakob Mohn, and on the maternal side he was a grandson of bishop Jacob Neumann. He was a grand-uncle of Frank and Albert Henrik Mohn, and an uncle-in-law of Nils Yngvar Ustvedt.

He enrolled in higher education during 1864 at the University of Christiania and graduated with the cand.mag. degree in 1869. He worked as a school teacher in Bergen, Stavanger, Christiania and Aalesund before holding his final job at Bergen Cathedral School from 1884 to 1889. He is best known as a contributor to the popularity of outdoors life in Norway, specifically mountaineering. He wrote in the yearbook of the Norwegian Trekking Association between 1871 and his death, and was also an illustrator. He ascended several mountains, but one of the downpoints came when he, trekking together with William Cecil Slingsby, did not manage to first ascend the Store Skagastølstind. He does hold co-credit for the first ascent of other mountains, such as Torfinnstindene.

Mohn also travelled to other countries, partly in order to improve his health. He still struggled, however, with both physical and mental problems. He committed suicide by drowning in April 1891 in Utne.
