= Jakob Mohn =

Norwegian statistician (1838–1882)

Jakob Neumann Mohn (31 May 1838 – 16 February 1882) was a Norwegian statistician.

== Personal life ==
He was born in Bergen as a son of Albert Henrik Mohn (1811–1894) and Ida Neumann (1814–1864). Originally named Jacob, he changed the spelling. He was a brother of Henrik and Emanuel Mohn. On the maternal side, he was a grandson of bishop Jacob Neumann. In July 1866 he married Valeria Paasche (1843–1912). He was a granduncle of Frank and Albert Henrik Mohn, and since his daughter Hanna married physician and politician Nils Yngvar Ustvedt, Mohn was a grandfather of Hans Jacob Ustvedt.

== Career ==
He finished his secondary education at Bergen Cathedral School in 1855, and graduated from the Royal Frederick University with the cand.jur. degree already in 1859. He was soon hired in the Statistics Office, and together with Anders Nicolai Kiær he led its transition into an independent research directorate, renamed Det statistiske Centralbureau in 1876. Norway as a country implemented the use of large, quantitative statistics in politics quite early. The initiator was the priest and researcher Eilert Sundt, and Mohn. Mohn was also involved in the workers' society Christiania Arbeidersamfund, and through his research on child labour among other things, he capacitated social reform. His last work was Norges Land og Folk, requisitioned by the Norwegian Parliament in 1874, and meant to be a grand reference work. However, he never finished a single volume, as he died in February 1882 in Kristiania. His work was carried on by Anders Nicolai Kiær and Boye Strøm.
