= Bakke Mølle =

Former Norwegian grain mill in Oslo

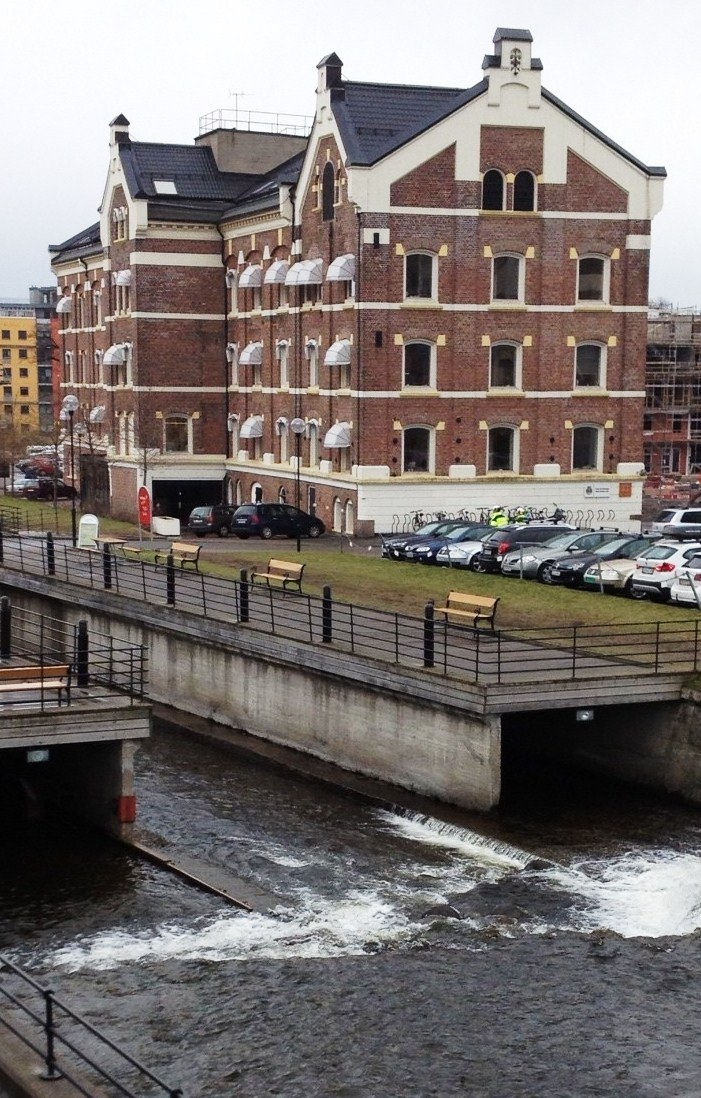
- Industry: Grain milling
- Founded: 1811
- Founder: Hans Nielsen Hauge
- Defunct: 1941
- Fate: Acquired by Bjølsen Valsemølle; closed
- Headquarters: Nydalen, Oslo, Norway
- Products: Flour, grain products

Bakke Mølle was a grain mill on the west bank of the Akerselva in Nydalen, Oslo. It was founded in 1811 by the preacher Hans Nielsen Hauge, who established it after a spell in prison, partly to help provide bread for the town's poor. Through the 19th century it became one of the country's largest grain mills.

Having burned and been rebuilt several times, Bakke Mølle was sold to Bjølsen Valsemølle in 1932, which moved all operations to Bjølsen in 1941, closing the mill. The building was bought by Christiania Spigerverk, which used it for storage and later as offices, and after the Spigerverk was wound down in the late 1980s it was converted to office use; it today houses the district administration for Nordre Aker, among others.
