= Albert Henrik Mohn =

Norwegian journalist and correspondent

Albert Henrik Mohn (25 November 1918 – 9 May 1999) was a Norwegian journalist and correspondent.

He was born in Bergen as a son of ship-owner and captain Sigurd Mohn (1885–1959) and Margrete Oettinger (1893–1985). He was a brother of Frank Mohn and a grandnephew of Jakob, Henrik and Emanuel Mohn. He finished middle school in 1933 and commerce school in 1934. During World War II he spent some years in exile in the United Kingdom. He worked with psychological warfare and held the military rank of lieutenant, having been twice rejected as a fighting soldier (once during the Norwegian Campaign in 1940) due to his health. He also worked for the newspaper Norsk Tidend and for BBC. He married British citizen Stella Comber in 1943. After the war he was hired by Toralv Øksnevad as a Norwegian Broadcasting Corporation foreign correspondent. After Øksnevad left, Mohn eventually left as well, and began writing for newspapers, including Verdens Gang. He was also a foreign affairs editor for Morgenavisen.

Notable documentary books include China i smeltedigelen (1950), Rød taifun over Korea (1951), Nassers nære Orient (1957), Nærbilde av Amerika (1964), Vietnam (1965), Tidsbomben Midt-Østen (1971), Tragedien Nord-Irland (1972) and Afghanistan kjemper (1981). He published memoirs in 1988 and 1990. He also published a poetry collection in 1946 and four thriller novels. He died in May 1999 from renal failure at Haukeland University Hospital.
