= Jens Boalth =

Norwegian educator (1725–1780)

Jens Boalth (8 March 1725 – 5 December 1780) was a Norwegian educator. He was Rector at the Bergen Cathedral School and a driving force behind cultural development in Bergen, Norway.

He was born in Christiania (now Oslo, Norway). He was the son of Larsen Boalth (1697–1744 and Anne Cathrine Pedersdatter Kolding (1695–1765). He grew up in a wealthy merchant family and attended Christiania Cathedral School. In 1742, he entered the University of Copenhagen, where he relieved his theological degree in 1745 and took a Magister degree in 1750.

From 1756, he was Rector at the Bergen Cathedral School. In total, he was an educator at the school for more than 20 years. He co-founded the Bergen Philharmonic Orchestra in 1765 and the Philharmonic Drawing School in 1772. In 1774, he founded Det nyttige Selskab, a service society which focused on the well being of the general population.
