= Loen Church =

Church in Vestland, Norway

- Loen kyrkje
- Lokyrkja
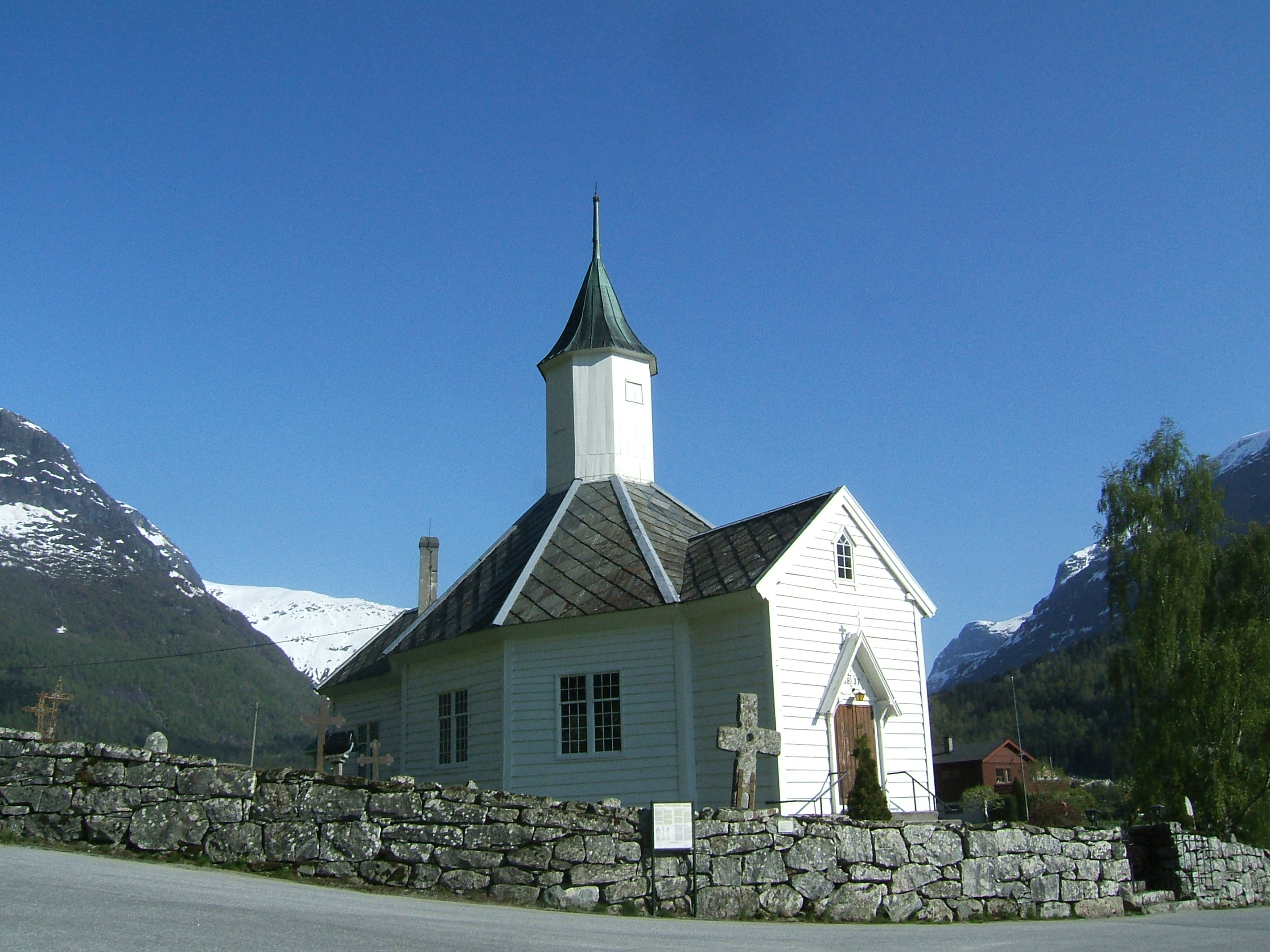
- View of the church
- Loen Church
- 61°52′18″N 6°51′28″E
- Location: Stryn Municipality, Vestland
- Country: Norway
- Denomination: Church of Norway
- Churchmanship: Evangelical Lutheran

History
- Status: Parish church
- Founded: 13th century
- Consecrated: 9 Sept 1838

Architecture
- Functional status: Active
- Architectural type: Octagonal
- Completed: 1838 (188 years ago)

Specifications
- Capacity: 190
- Materials: Wood

Administration
- Diocese: Bjørgvin bispedømme
- Deanery: Nordfjord prosti
- Parish: Loen
- Norwegian Cultural Heritage Site
- Type: Church
- Status: Automatically protected
- ID: 84320

Loen Church (Norwegian: Loen kyrkje or Lokyrkja) is a parish church of the Church of Norway in Stryn Municipality in Vestland county, Norway. It is located in the village of Loen. It is the church for the Loen parish which is part of the Nordfjord prosti (deanery) in the Diocese of Bjørgvin. The white, wooden church was built in an octagonal design in 1838 using plans drawn up by an unknown architect. The church seats about 190 people.

There are two stone pillars in the churchyard that memorialize the local residents who died in 1905 and 1936 when the rock slides from the mountain Ramnefjellet caused tsunamis which flooded many farms surrounding the lake Lovatnet.

== History ==
The earliest existing historical records of the church date back to the year 1330, but the church was not new at that time. The first church in Loen was likely a wooden stave church that was erected in the 13th century. Around the year 1600, the church was rebuilt and enlarged. A new timber-framed nave was built on the west end of the old church and the old stave church nave was converted into the chancel of the new church. The result was a larger, partially new long church on the same site. That church building stood for nearly a century without a church tower, but in 1707 a tower was built and it was funded by private donations. This church was used until 1838 when the church was completely torn down. A few months later, a new church was built on the same site. This new building had an oblong, octagonal design. The nave measures about 12.5 by 10 metres (41 ft × 33 ft) at its widest point and it has a rectangular choir in the east measuring about 5.5 by 5.5 metres (18 ft × 18 ft), and it has a nearly square church porch in the west. The new building was constructed by the lead builder Elling Olsen Waldboe. The church was consecrated on 9 September 1838 by Provost Wilhelm Frimann Koren on behalf of Bishop Jacob Neumann.

== Media gallery ==
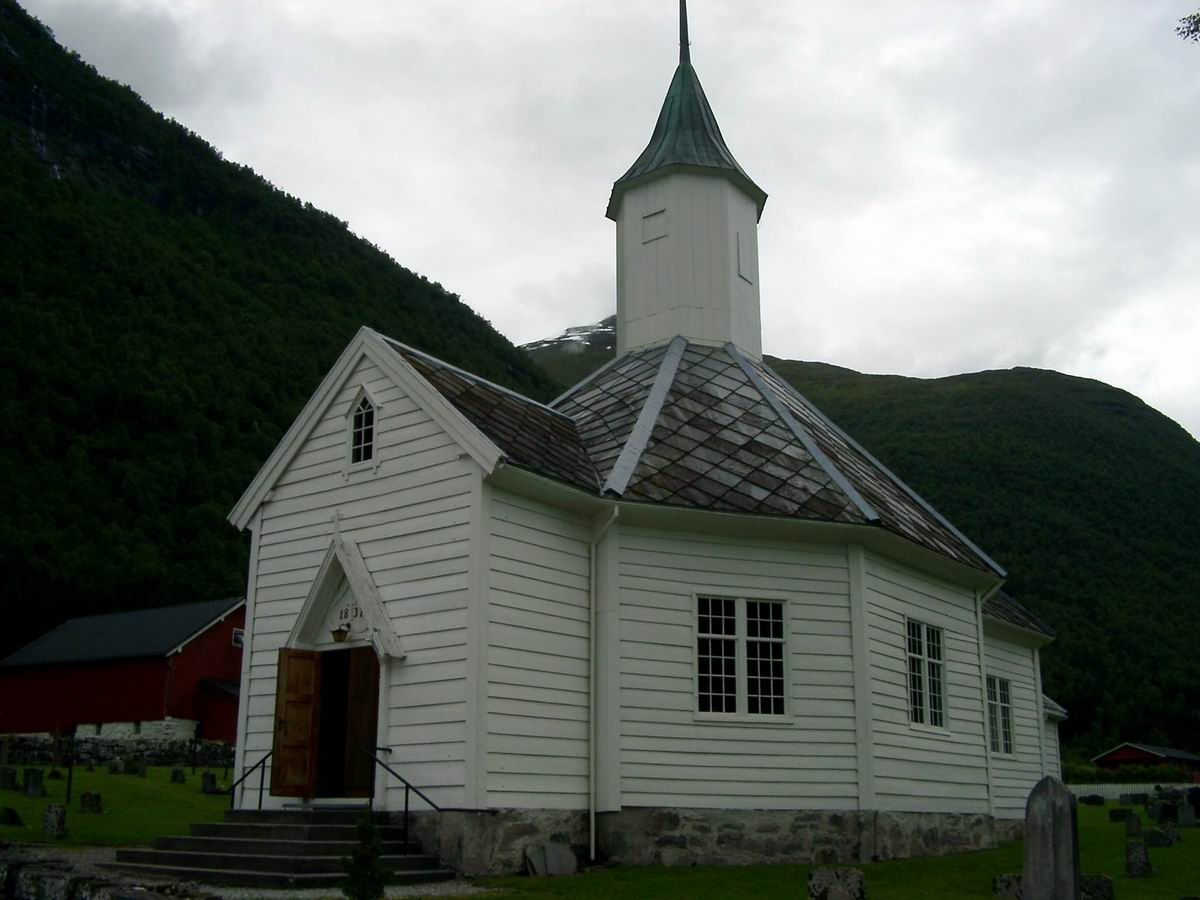

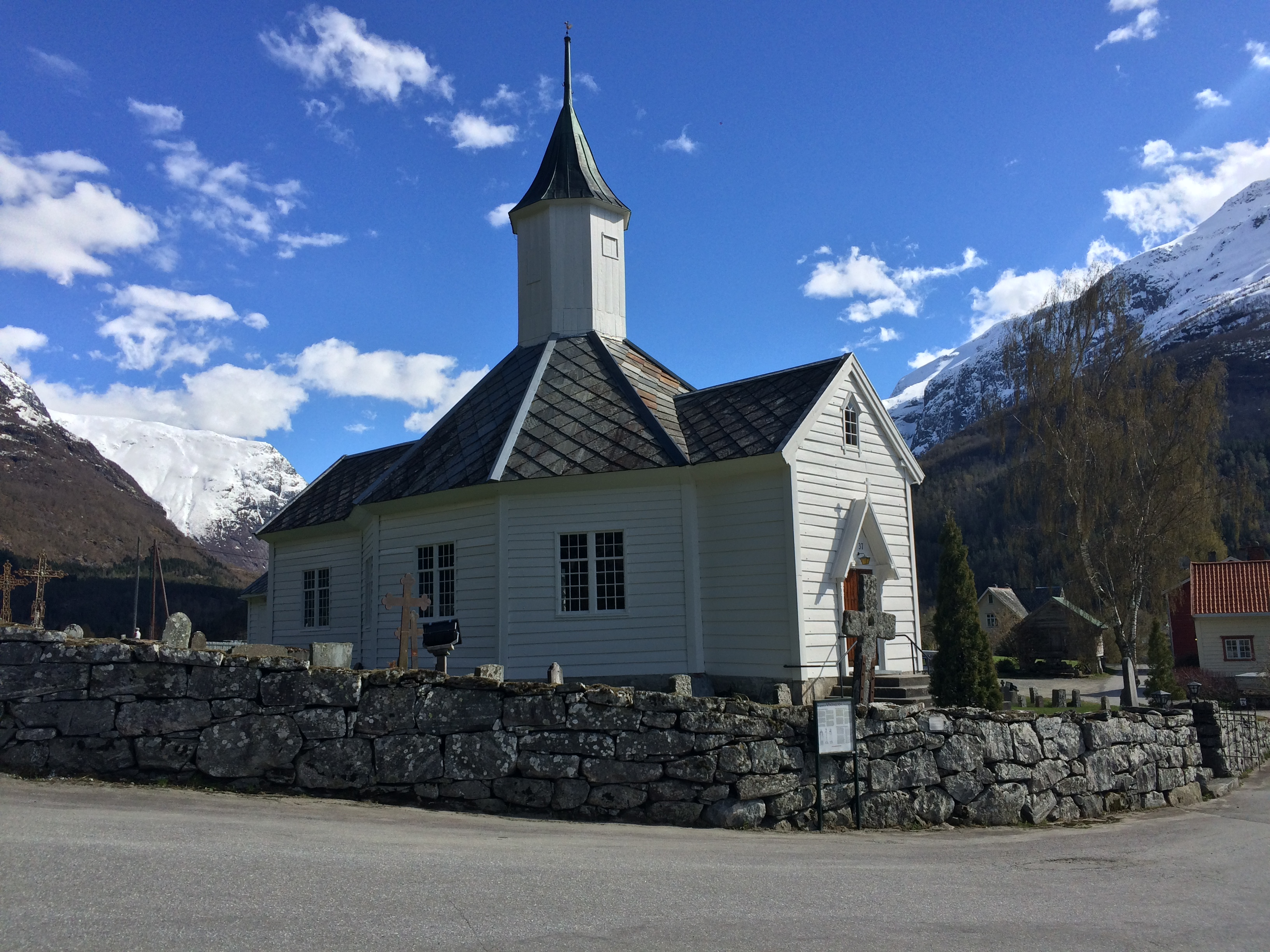

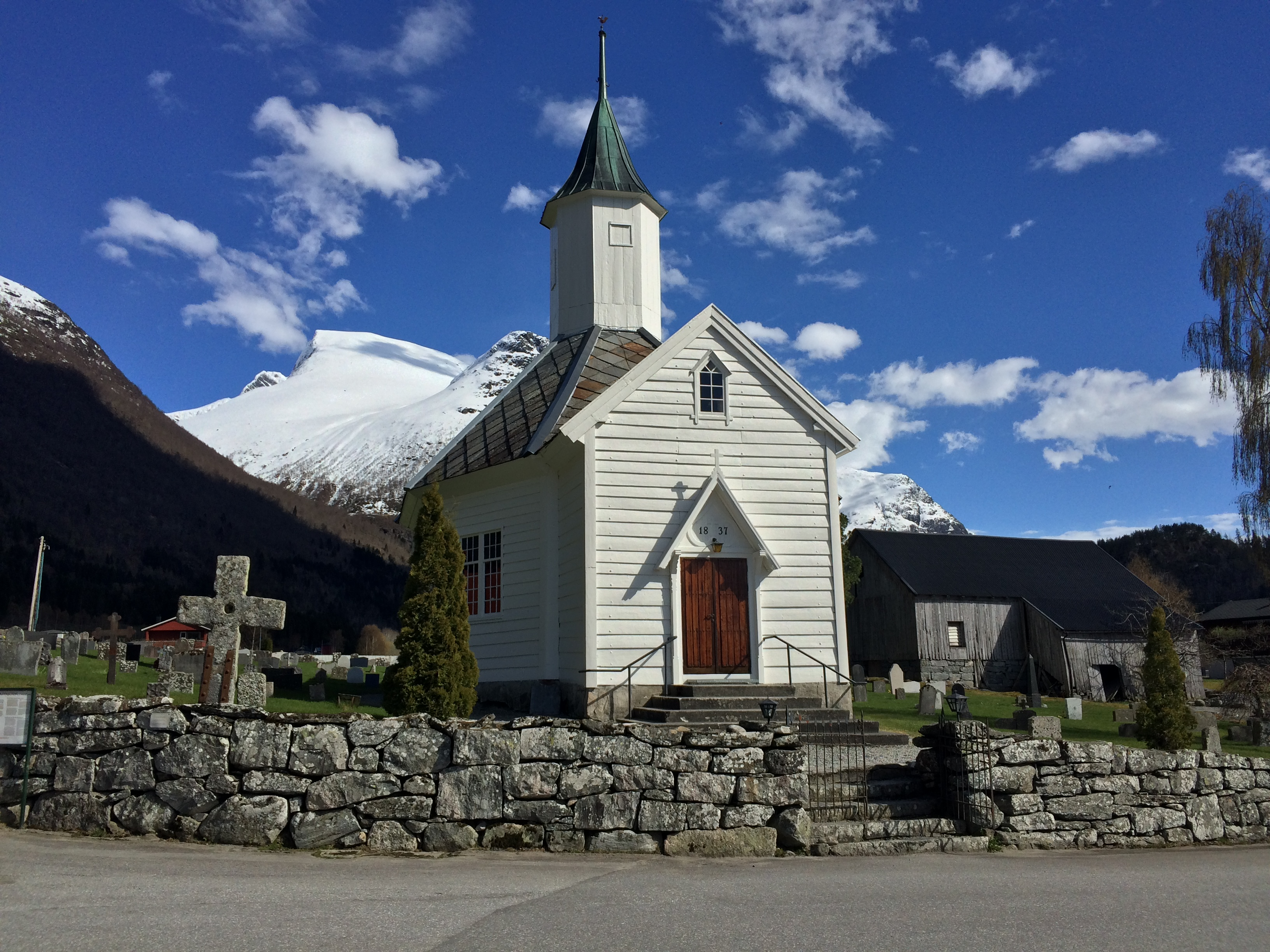

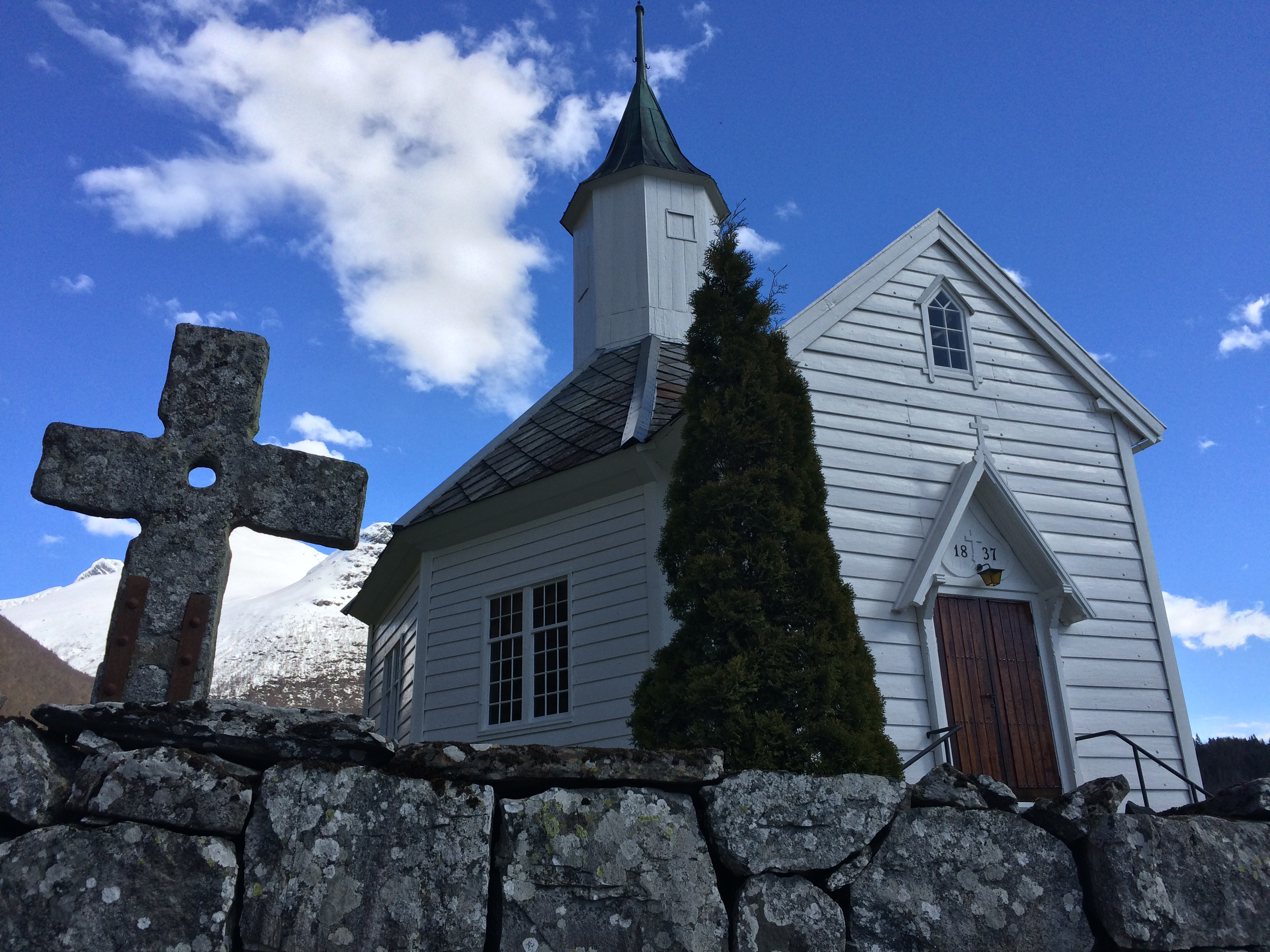

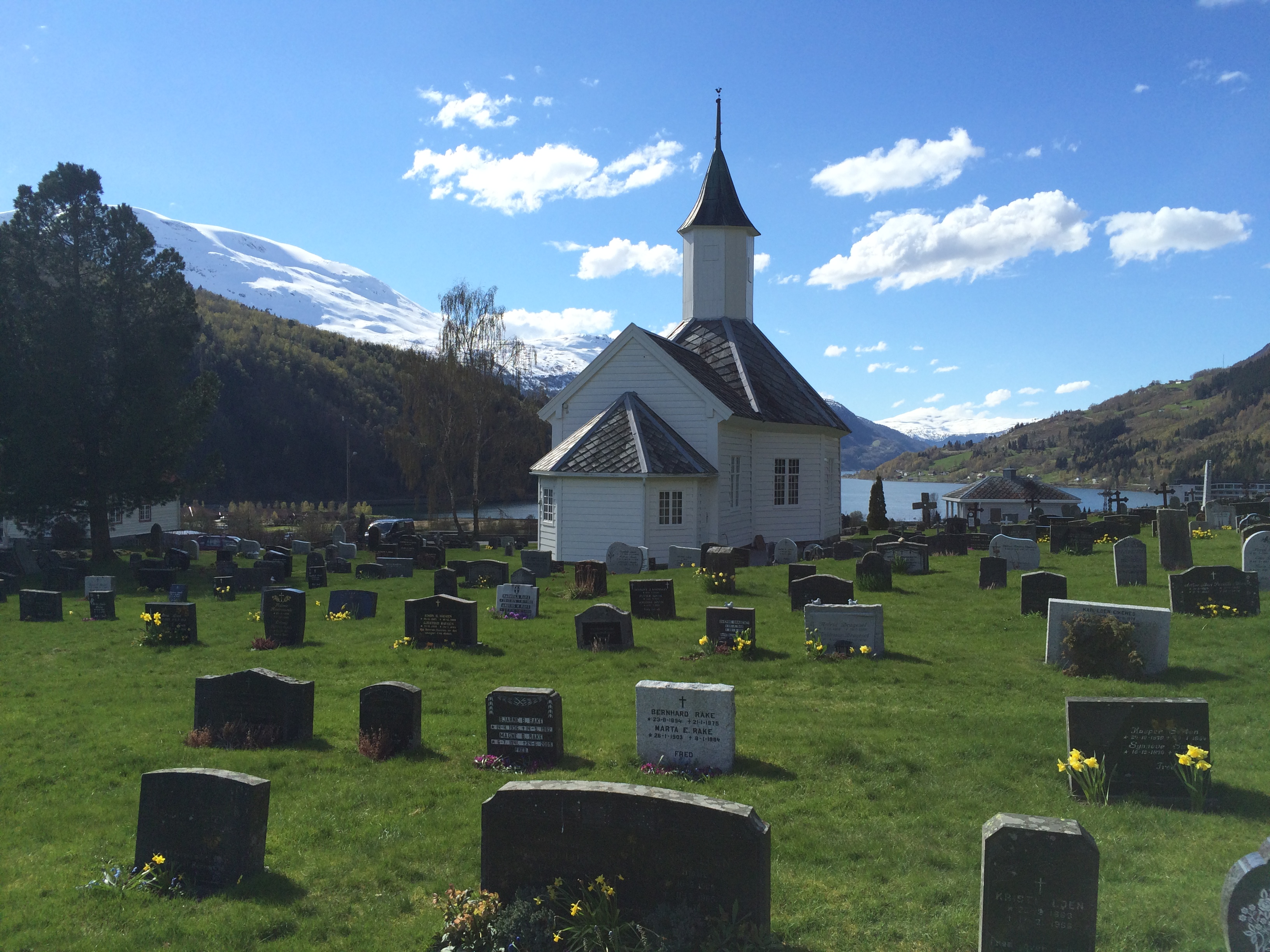

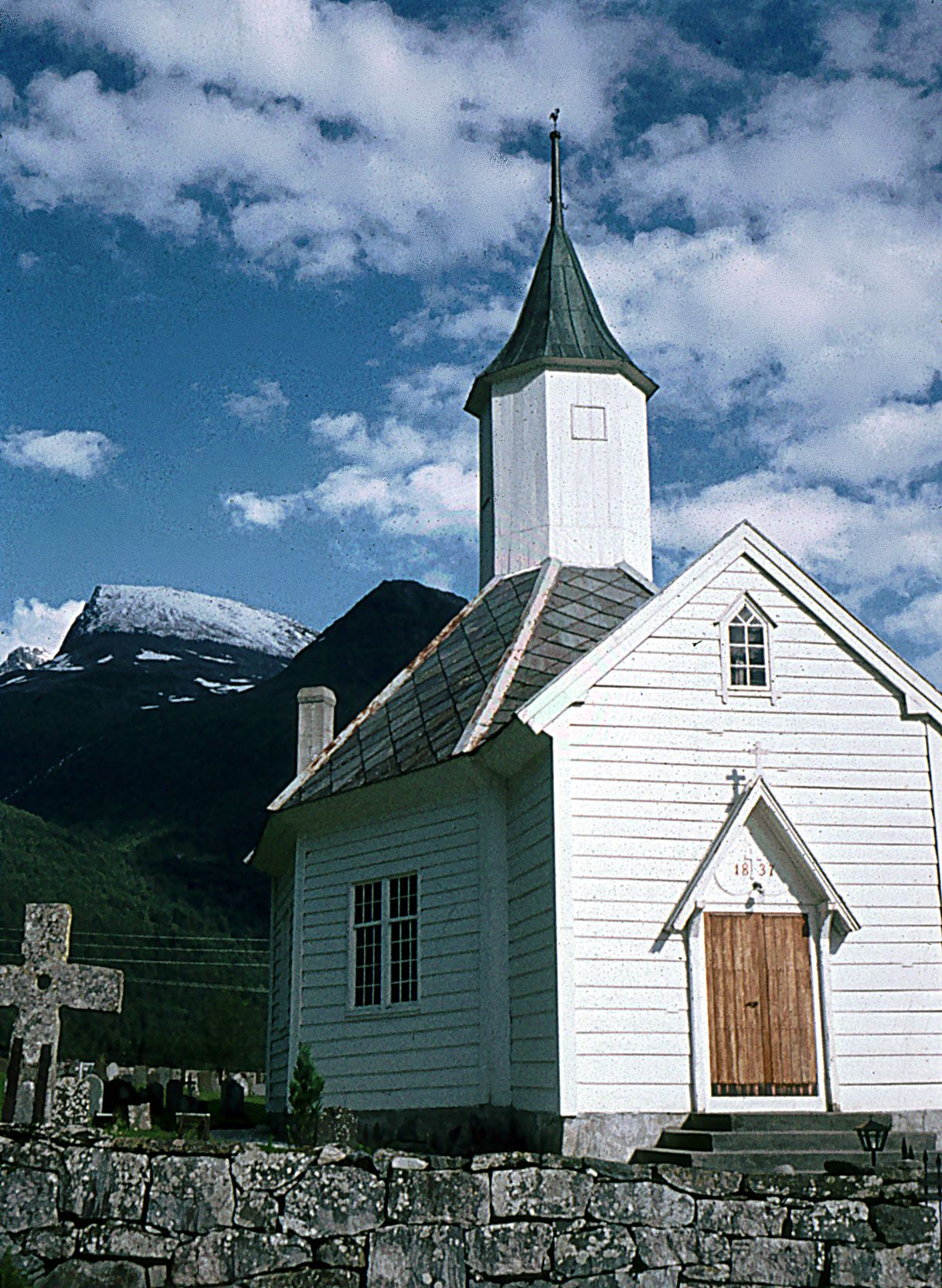

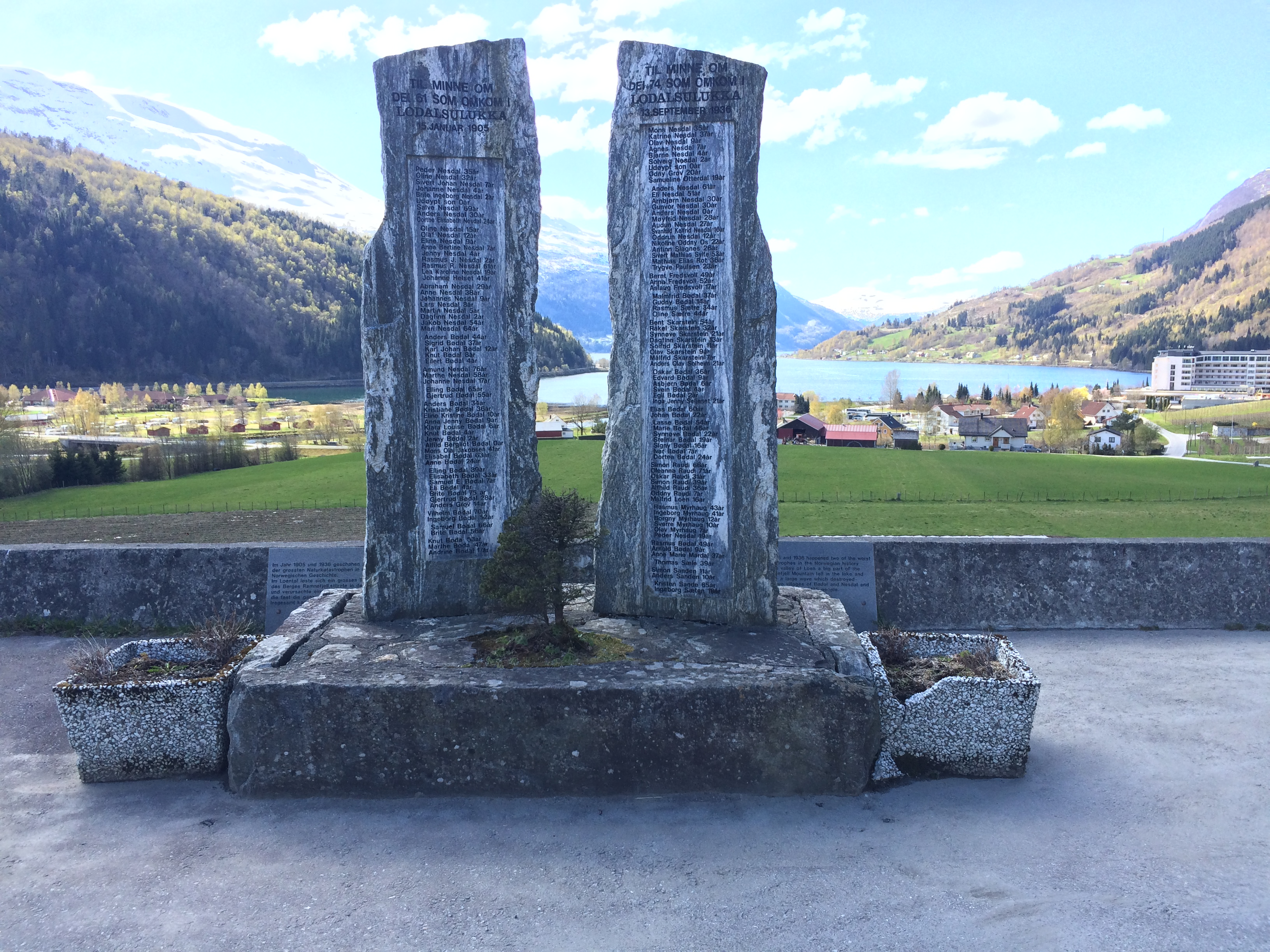
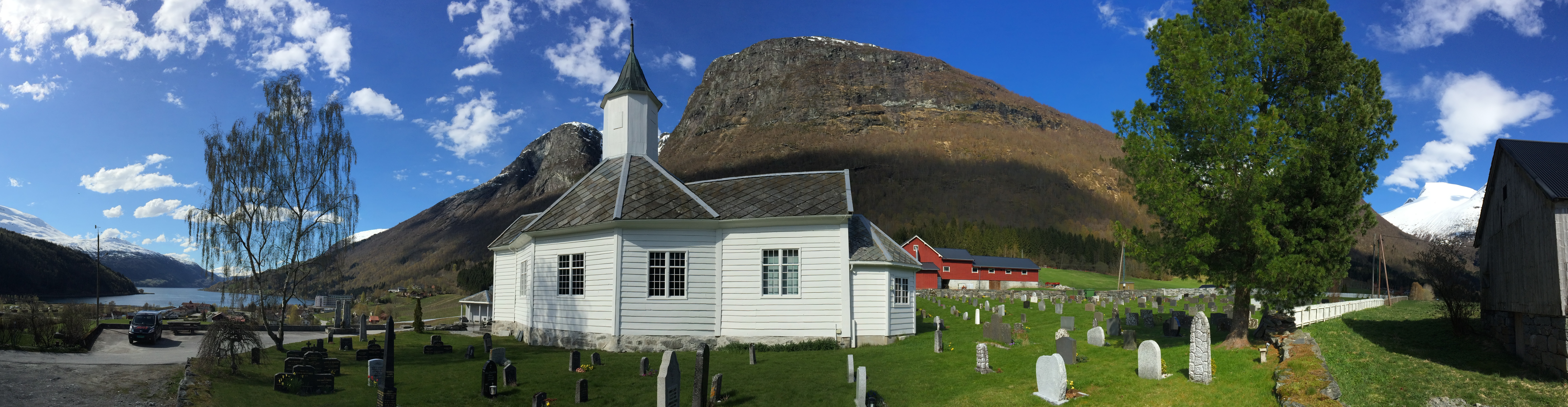

== See also ==
- List of churches in Bjørgvin
