= Adolf Indrebø =

Norwegian politician

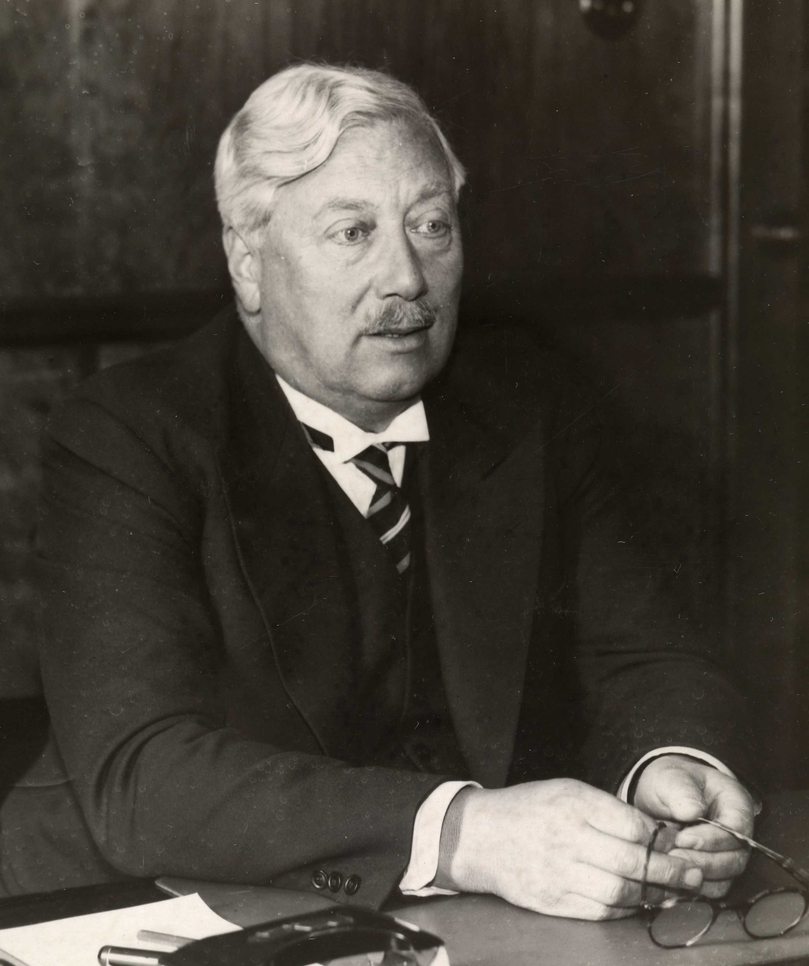
Adolf Indrebø

Adolf Oliverson Indrebø (7 February 1884 – 5 December 1942) was a Norwegian politician for the Labour Party.

He hailed from Førde Municipality, but moved to Oslo as a student. He was a member of Oslo city council from 1917 to 1934, serving as mayor from 1929 to 1931.

In 1935, during the cabinet Nygaardsvold, he was appointed Minister of Finance. He held this post one year. He was also head of the Ministry of Defense, briefly in 1935.

Preceded by Borger With	Mayor of Oslo; 1929–1931	Succeeded by Eyvind Getz
Preceded by Gunnar Jahn	Minister of Finance (Norway); 1935–1936	Succeeded by Kornelius Bergsvik
