= Edvard Edvardsen =

Norwegian historian and educator

- Born: 16 November 1630; Bergen, Norway
- Died: 1695 (aged 64–65)
- Occupations: Historian and educator

Edvard Edvardsen (16 November 1630 – March 1695) was a Norwegian historian and educator. He was born in Bergen. His descriptions of the city of Bergen have been basis for several later historical works. He was assigned at the Bergen Cathedral School, and among his students were the later priest and poet Petter Dass and playwright Ludvig Holberg.
