= Det nyttige Selskab =

Organization

Det nyttige Selskab (lit. "The Serviceable Society") is a non-profit organization in Bergen, Norway.

== History ==
Det nyttige Selskab was founded in Bergen in 1774 by Jens Boalth (1725–1780), who was the principal at Bergen Cathedral School from 1756 to 1780 and also co-founded the Bergen Philharmonic Orchestra in 1765 and the Philharmonic Drawing School in 1772. It purpose was to support enterprises that improved the general health, "to the true well-being of fellow citizens". Between 1777 and 1793, the Society awarded gold medals to people who improved production of foodstuffs and other goods, as well as to people who made medicinal discoveries. From 1818 the society became more of a modernizing agent, supporting banks, industry, communications and education. It was a co-founder of the bank Bergens Sparebank in 1823 and brought Bergen's first steam ship Oscar to the city in 1827. However, the ship had to be sold in 1827. During its first 50-odd years the Society had financial challenges.

In 1850, the Society changed their by-laws, and now concentrated exclusively on Bergen city. It has committed money to refurbishing parts of the city, with cobblestone, statues and squares. Statues raised with the help of Det nyttige Selskab include the controversial Olav Kyrre statue by Knut Steen 1998 and the statue of Roald Jensen outside Brann stadion. From 1952 to 1993 the Society awarded an architectural prize in Bergen. It was awarded for the first time in 1953 and last in 1990.
