= Dagfinn Gedde-Dahl =

Norwegian physician

- Born: 1 March 1937; Florø, Norway
- Died: 12 June 2016 (aged 79)
- Occupation: Physician
- Parent: Tobias Gedde-Dahl
- Relatives: Målfrid Grude Flekkøy (sister-in-law); Yngvar Ustvedt (brother-in-law)

Dagfinn Gedde-Dahl (1 March 1937 – 12 June 2016) was a Norwegian physician.

He was born in Florø, a son of Tobias Müller Gedde-Dahl. He served as president of the Norwegian Medical Association from 1976 to 1979. He was a chief physician at the Diakonhjemmet Hospital from 1980 to 1992, and then head physician until 2003.
