= Haavard Martinsen =

Norwegian chemist and industrial leader

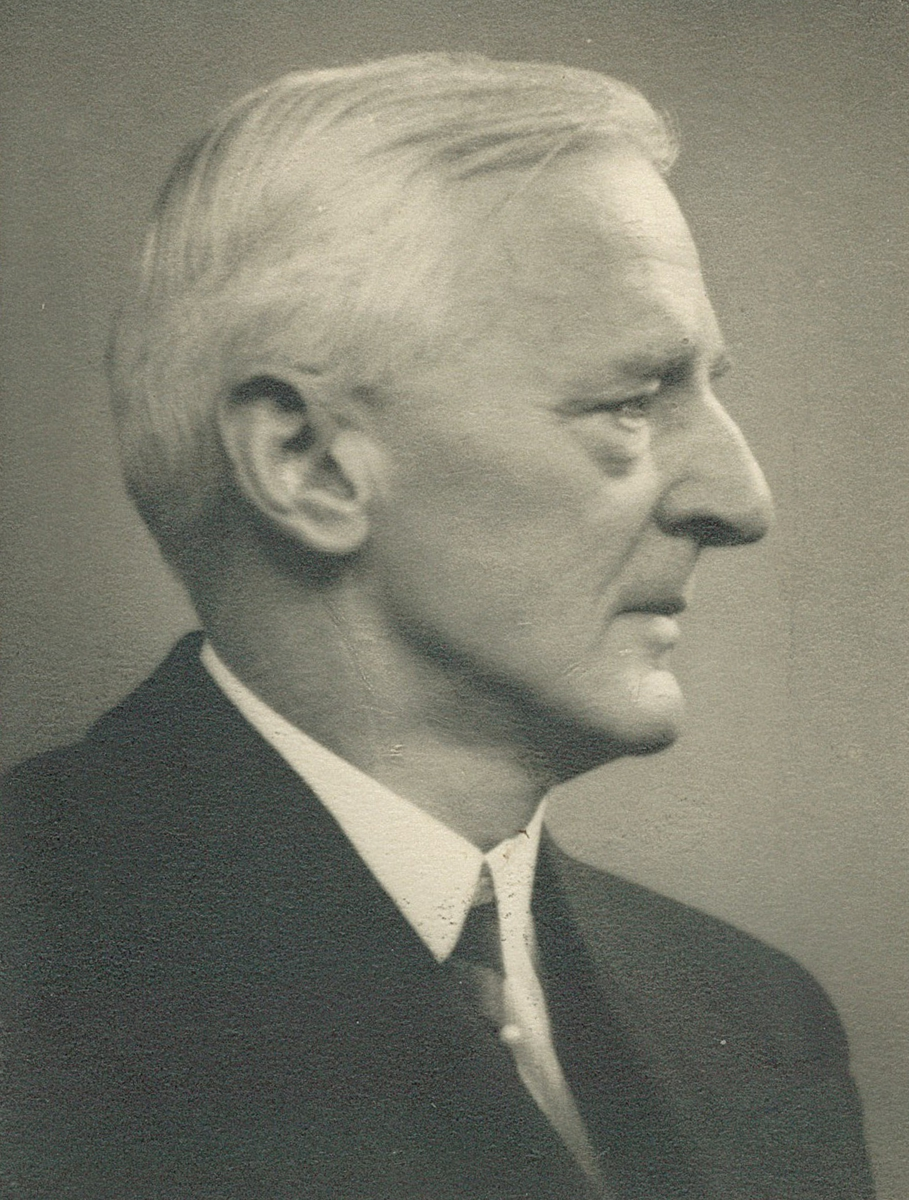
- Born: 6 February 1879; Nedre Eiker, Norway
- Died: 2 August 1967 (aged 88)
- Occupations: Chemist; Industrial leader
- Parent: Gustav Martinsen
- Awards: Order of St. Olav; Legion of Honour; Order of the British Empire; Order of Orange-Nassau

Haavard Martinsen (6 February 1879 – 2 August 1967) was a Norwegian chemist and industrial leader.

Early life and education

Martinsen was born in Nedre Eiker to Gustav Martinsen and Johanna Jeremiassen. He graduated as a chemist from the University of Dresden in 1902.

== Work in industry ==
From 1918 to 1949 Martinsen was director of the grain mill Bjølsen Valsemølle.

== Political career ==
Martinsen served as mayor of Kristiania from 1920 to 1922.

== Honours ==
He was decorated as a Knight, First Class of the Order of St. Olav in 1939. He was made Commander of the French Legion of Honour, Grand Officer of the Order of Orange-Nassau, and was appointed to the Order of the British Empire.

Political offices
Preceded by Carl Jeppesen	Mayor of Kristiania; 1920–1922	Succeeded by Borger With
