= Jacob Neumann =

Norwegian politician

The Right Reverend Jacob Neumann
- Bishop of Bjørgvin
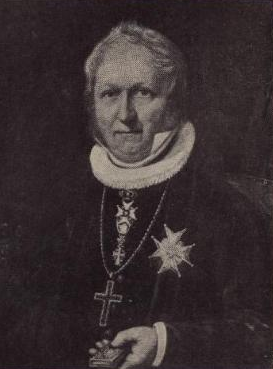
- Diocese: Diocese of Bjørgvin
- Installed: 1822
- Term ended: 1848
- Predecessor: Peder Christian Hersleb Kjerschow
- Successor: Claus Pavels

Personal details
- Born: 13 June 1772 Strømsø
- Died: 25 January 1848 (aged 75) Bergen
- Buried: St Mary's Church, Bergen
- Denomination: Lutheranism
- Parents: Hans Neumann; Annechen Blom
- Spouse: Justine Bruun
- Education: University of Copenhagen

Jacob Neumann (13 July 1772 – 25 January 1848) was a Norwegian bishop.

== Personal life ==
He was born in Strømsø as a son of Hans Neumann (1745–1789) and Annechen Johanne Blom (1754–1773), and a grandson of Jakob Hansen Neumann. He was also a first cousin of Gustav Peter Blom and Gustava Kielland and a second cousin of Christian Blom.

In February 1800 in Copenhagen, he married pharmacist's daughter Justine Marie Agnete Bruun (1780–1838). They had the grandchildren Henrik, Jakob and Emanuel Mohn and Kristofer Janson.

== Career ==
He studied under Christian Kølle at Snarøya from 1781 to 1785 and in Elsinore from 1785 to 1787, before enrolling at the University of Copenhagen, where he graduated in 1796 with the cand.theol. degree. He took the dr.philos. degree in church history in 1799 on the thesis Historia primatus Lundensis. He worked as a private tutor until 1799, when he became curate in Asker. In 1805 he was promoted to vicar. He continued writing, being one of the last Rationalists in Norway. In 1811 he published Doctor M. Luthers lille Katechismus, a version of Martin Luther's catechism. He was elected to the first session of the Parliament of Norway in 1814, representing Agershus Amt. In 1819 he became dean of Drammen in 1819. In 1822 he was promoted to bishop of the Diocese of Bjørgvin. He was a member of Det nyttige Selskab in Bergen, and was a co-founder of Bergens Sparebank in 1823 and Bergen Museum in 1825. He also served as deputy representative to Parliament in 1824.

He was decorated with the Order of the Dannebrog in 1811 and the Order of the Polar Star in 1815. He died in January 1848 in Bergen.

Religious titles
Preceded by Claus Pavels	Bishop of Bjørgvin; 1822–1848	Succeeded by Peder Christian Hersleb Kjerschow
