= Hans Jacob Ustvedt =

Norwegian medical doctor and broadcasting administrator

- Born: 4 July 1903; Kristiania, Norway
- Died: 26 January 1982 (aged 78)
- Occupation(s): medical doctor and broadcasting administrator
- Children: Yngvar Ustvedt
- Father: Nils Yngvar Ustvedt
- Relatives: Jakob Mohn (grandfather); Borger With (father-in-law)

Hans Jacob Neumann Ustvedt (4 July 1903 – 26 January 1982) was a Norwegian medical doctor and broadcasting administrator. He was a driving force of the doctors' resistance during World War II, had to flee to Sweden in 1942, and was leading the medical office at the Norwegian legation in Stockholm. He was a professor of internal medicine at the University of Oslo from 1951 to 1962, and Director-General of the Norwegian Broadcasting Corporation (NRK) from 1962 to 1972.

== Personal life ==
Ustvedt was born in Kristiania. His parents were dr.med. Nils Yngvar Ustvedt and Hanna Mohn. His maternal grandfather was Jakob Mohn. Ustvedt was married to Ingrid With, a daughter of banker Borger With, from 1927 to 1947, and to psychologist Liv Dahl from 1947. He was the father of writer and radio personality Yngvar Ustvedt, born 1928.

== Medical career ==
Ustvedt was cand.med. in 1927, and then assistant physician in Tromsø, Trondheim and Oslo. From 1934 he worked as a physician at Ullevål Hospital and from 1938 at Rikshospitalet, and at the same time working towards a doctorate degree. He was interested in music, being a pianist and singer himself, and his doctorate, published in 1937, was on musicality of patients with brain damages.

=== World War II ===
During the occupation of Norway by Nazi Germany between 1940 and 1945 Ustvedt was one of the driving forces of the Norwegian physicians' organized resistance, as he had been elected chairman of the organization Yngre Legers Forening in 1940. He was also involved in building up the so-called Coordination Committee (KK), an organ to coordinate the professional organisations' fight against Nazi influence and takeover. He cooperated closely with Ferdinand Schjelderup, and initiated the formation of KK's cultural group. He had to flee to Sweden in 1942, and was leading the medical office at the Norwegian legation in Stockholm.

=== Post war ===
Ustvedt was a chief physician at Ullevål Hospital from 1946 to 1959, and from 1959 chief physician at Rikshospitalet. He was a professor of internal medicine at the University of Oslo from 1951 to 1962, having applied for the first time in 1948. At the same time he participated in European tuberculosis organizations, and was a member of the board of the Norwegian aid programme in Kerala, India.

He published several scientific works on internal medicine and immunology. He was a member of the Norwegian Academy of Science and Letters from 1949, and from 1946 to 1947 he chaired the Norwegian Medical Society and was a member of the board of the Norwegian Medical Association. He also sat on the committee that awards the Anders Jahre Award for Medical Research.

== Broadcasting career ==
While working as a physician, Ustvedt had also been a radio lecturer and speaker through the Norwegian Broadcasting Corporation (NRK). In 1959 he was appointed leader for the Broadcasting Council, advisory council for NRK. He was appointed Director-General of the NRK in 1962, largely due to votes of members of the Broadcasting Council, and held this position until 1972. His appointment led to some controversy, and his period in office was also full of controversies. The development of television, then a relatively new and strong medium, led to several fights over program policy, from vanguard theatre repertoire to sexual education in school. A period of significant increase in staff size, combined with a general radicalisation among young academics, led to both external and internal conflicts.

Media offices
Preceded by Kaare Fostervoll	Director-General of the Norwegian Broadcasting Corporation; 1962–1972	Succeeded by Torolf Elster
