= Walter Gedde =

English Designer

Walter Gedde was an English designer of the Jacobean period.

He is known for his influential A Booke of Sundry Draughtes principaly serving for Glasiers (London: Walter Dight, 1615).

No further information for his biography is known.

The book contains 103 woodcut engravings. Gedde explained that his patterns were also suitable for plasterers and gardeners.

Some designs derive from Sebastiano Serlio's Il Quattro Libri Dell'Architettura.
