= Gustav Martinsen =

Norwegian politician (1843–1920)

- Born: 5 November 1843; Drammen, Norway
- Died: 19 March 1920 (aged 76)
- Occupations: Politician; Industrial leader
- Children: Gustav Martinsen Haavard Martinsen Theodor Martinsen
- Parent: Martin Christophersen Oline Gulbrandsen
- Awards: Order of St. Olav; Order of the Dannebrog

Gustav Martinsen (5 November 1843 – 19 March 1920) was a Norwegian industrial leader and politician for the Conservative Party.

He was born in Drammen to merchant Martin Christophersen and Oline Gulbrandsen, and was the father of Haavard Martinsen. He founded the mill Bjølsen Valsemølle in 1884, and initiated and chaired Norsk Mølleforening. He was a member of the Storting from 1900 to 1906. He was decorated Knight, First Class of the Order of St. Olav in 1904, and was a Knight of the Order of the Dannebrog.
