= Dietmar Gedde =

German sailor

Personal information
- Nationality: German
- Born: 11 February 1936 (age 89); Magdeburg, Germany

Sport
- Sport: Sailing

Dietmar Gedde (born 11 February 1936) is a German sailor. He competed at the 1964 Summer Olympics and the 1972 Summer Olympics.
