= Kari Martinsen =

Norwegian nurse and academic (born 1943)

Kari Martinsen (born 1943) is a Norwegian nurse and academic, whose work focuses on nursing theory. After competing nursing training and working as a psychiatric nurse, she returned to school to earn a bachelor's, master's and PhD degree. Developing ideas about the philosophy involved in taking care of other people, she moved away from practicing nursing and turned toward academia. She taught at various universities in Norway and Denmark and was recognized as a Knight 1st Class of the Order of St. Olav for nursing by the Norwegian crown in 2011.

== Early life ==
Kari Marie Martinsen was born in Oslo, Norway in 1943. The older of two sisters, she grew up in a home composed of her parents, who were both economists and had formerly been part of the Norwegian resistance movement during World War II, her sister and her grandmother. After completion of her high schooling, Martinsen enrolled in Ullevål College of Nursing and graduated in 1964.

== Career ==
Upon her graduation, Martinsen completed a clinical practice at Ullevål University Hospital through 1965 and then worked as a psychiatric nurse at Dikemark Psychiatric Hospital for two years. During her work, she began to question the policy of objectifying patients by focusing on the technology of care and disease, rather than the patient. The idea led her to further her education, enrolling in psychology at the University of Oslo, from where she obtained a bachelor's degree in 1968. Going on to further her education, Martinsen enrolled at the University of Bergen (UB) to study philosophy and phenomenology. She completed her Master of Arts degree in 1974 with her thesis, Philosophy and Nursing: A Marxist and Phenomenological Contribution (1975), which was the first critical analysis in Norway evaluating the profession from a philosophical and social perspective.

From 1976 to 1977, Martinsen served as dean of the Nursing Teacher’s Training faculty, which had been established as a joint venture by county authorities, three nursing colleges and the University of Bergen. At the time in Norway, debate was on-going over the educational requirements for nurses. Martinsen favored a four-year program, attained through a 2-year care assistant certification, followed by another two years of study to attain a nursing degree. Her stance that the social aspects of care were equal to the technical aspects, were viewed as provocative and she was asked to withdraw from the Norwegian Nursing Association (NSF). In 1978, Martinsen took a position at the University of Oslo in the history department as a lecturer on socio-political history and worked to develop the social history of nursing in Norway under a grant she had received from the General Science Research Council.

Martinsen returned to the University of Bergen in 1981 as a scientific assistant in the history department, lecturing on feminist history. Her research focus from 1976 to 1986 evaluated the social history of women and caring, evaluating when the shift from care of the sick shifted from "women's work" and charitable activities to professionally trained nurses. She completed her PhD in philosophy from UB in 1984 with her work History of Nursing: Frank and Engaged Deaconesses: A Caring Profession Emerges 1860–1905. Promoted to associate professor in 1986, Martinson lectured in the Department of Health and Social Medicine at UB. Caring Nursing and Medicine: Historical-Philosophical Essays (1989) marked a turn in her research to a philosophical phase and evaluated the impact of Martin Heidegger's theories on the development of a concept of caring. In her philosophical studies, Martinsen makes a distinction between the activities of observing and classifying and perception, or the way one emotionally reacts to the patient.

The following year, Martinsen moved to Denmark to develop master's degree and PhD programs in nursing at Aarhus University. Soon after she arrived, Heidegger's ties to Nazism became public knowledge and Martinsen reevaluated her previous work based on his philosophy. In From Marx to Løgstrup: On Morality, Social Criticism and Sensuousness in Nursing (1993), she confronted the issues with Heidegger and introduced the philosophy of Knud Ejler Løgstrup, as it related to a discussion of care. While in Aarhus, she simultaneously worked as an adjunct professor at the University of Tromsø (UT) from 1994 to 1997. She moved to Tromsø in 1997 when she was offered a full professorship at UT, but remained only one year. Between 1998 and 2002, Martinsen worked as a free-lance researcher and lecturer before returning to the University of Bergen as a full professor of nursing science. In 2007, she accepted a full professorship at Harstad University College in Troms County northern Norway.

Martinsen's work has been influential in developing a concept of care in nursing in Nordic countries and has been used as a comparison point for nursing ethics in Anglo-American thought and practice. In 2011, Martinsen was recognized as a Knight 1st Class of the Order of St. Olav for nursing by the Norwegian crown.

== Selected works ==
- Martinsen, Kari (1989). Omsorg, sykepleie og medisin: historisk-filosofiske essays (in Norwegian). Oslo, Norway: Tano Aschehoug. ISBN 978-8-251-82654-9., later editions 1991, 2003
- "Omsorg og makt, ord og kropp i sykepleien" [Care and power, words and body in nursing]. Sykepleien (in Norwegian). 2. Oslo, Norway: Norske Sykepleierforbund: 2–11, 29. 1991. ISSN 0039-7628.
- Martinsen, Kari (1993). Den Omtenksomme sykepleier (in Norwegian). Oslo, Norway: Tano Aschehoug. ISBN 978-8-251-83096-6.
- Martinsen, Kari (1993). Fra Marx til Løgstrup: om etik og sanselighed i sygeplejen (in Danish). Copenhagen, Denmark: Munksgaard Danmark. ISBN 978-8-762-80043-4., later editions 1997, 1998, 2000, 2002, 2005, 2006, 2010
- Martinsen, Kari (1996). Fenomenologi og omsorg: tre dialoger (in Norwegian). Oslo, Norway: Tano Aschehoug. ISBN 978-8-251-83309-7., later edition 2003
