= Borger With =

Norwegian jurist, banker and politician

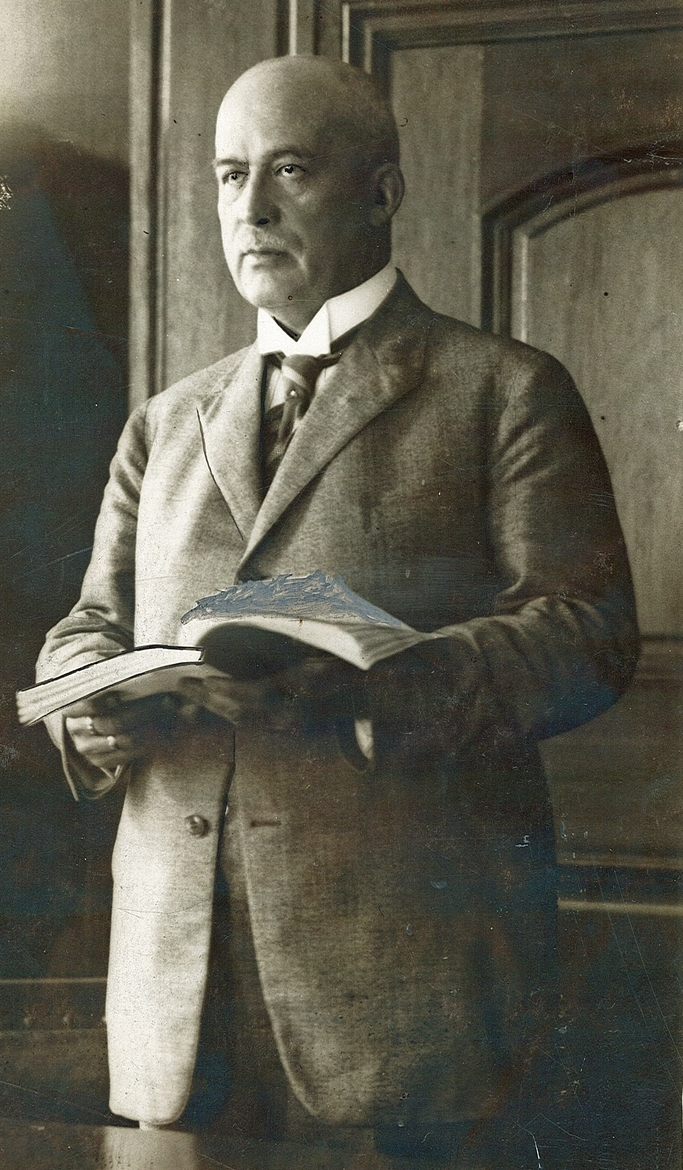
- With ca. 1930
- Born: 6 November 1872; Kragerø, Norway
- Died: 1930 (aged 57–58)
- Occupations: Lawyer and banker
- Relatives: Hans Jacob Ustvedt (son-in-law)
- Awards: Order of St. Olav; Order of Wasa; Order of the White Rose of Finland

Borger With (6 November 1872 – 1930) was a Norwegian jurist, banker and politician.

== Personal life ==
With was born in Kragerø to merchant Joachim Andreas With and Elise Sørensen. In 1899 He married Kathrine Frølich. Their daughter Ingrid was married to Hans Jacob Ustvedt.

== Career ==
With graduated as cand.jur. in 1896. He was appointed manager of Kristiania Folkebank from 1906. He served as mayor of Kristiania from 1923 to 1928. From 1928 he chaired the Norwegian Bankers' Association. He was a board member of the newspaper Morgenposten, and of the insurance companies Storebrand, Idun and Norske Atlas. He was chairman of the board of the whaling company Tønsberg Hvalfangeri and of Oslo Sporveier.

In the Norwegian parliamentary election, 1930, With fielded as the 5th ballot candidate in Oslo for the Conservative Party. The election would have made him first deputy to the Storting, had he not died shortly before the election.

With was decorated Knight of the Order of St. Olav, Commander of the Order of Wasa, and Commander of the Order of the White Rose of Finland.

Political offices
| Preceded by Haavard Martinsen | Mayor of Kristiania; 1923–1928 | Succeeded by Adolf Indrebø |
