= Yngvar Ustvedt =

Norwegian writer and radio personality

- Born: 8 April 1928; Tromsø, Norway
- Died: 29 January 2007 (aged 78)
- Occupations: University lecturer Non-fiction writer Radio personality
- Parent: Hans Jacob Ustvedt
- Relatives: Nils Yngvar Ustvedt (paternal grandfather); Borger With (maternal grandfather); Tobias Gedde-Dahl (father-in-law)

Yngvar Ustvedt (8 April 1928 – 29 January 2007) was a Norwegian writer, biographer, literary researcher, literary critic, theatre critic and radio personality.

== Personal life ==
Ustvedt was born in Tromsø, as the son of medical doctor and broadcasting administrator Hans Jacob Ustvedt, and Ingrid With. He was a grandson of Nils Yngvar Ustvedt. He married Lajla Margrete Gedde-Dahl in 1954, and librarian Tordis Seippel in 1969.

== Career ==
Ustvedt took his examen artium in 1946, and after studies at the University of Oslo, he became a cand.philol. in 1955. While being a student, he chaired the Norwegian Students' Society, in 1954. He lectured on Norwegian language and literature at the Sorbonne from 1958 to 1961. His doctoral thesis was a work on Henrik Wergeland, Det levende univers: En studie i Henrik Wergelands natur-lyrikk (1964). He was a literary critic for the newspaper Dagbladet from 1958 to 1978, and for Verdens Gang from 1987. He worked for the Norwegian Broadcasting Corporation (NRK), sporadically from 1949, and regularly from 1965 to 1987. He mainly produced programs on literature, culture and contemporary history. He wrote more than seventy books, including a series of four volumes on the history of Norway, Det skjedde i Norge (1978–1993). He wrote several books on the history of the labour movement, such as Opprørere from 1973, Karl Marx from 1976, and De store anarkister and De utopiske sosialister (both from 1977). He wrote books about World War II, both on everyday life in Norway, and the fate of mentally disordered people in Nazi Germany. He published a biography on Henrik Wergeland in 1994.

He was a board member of the Norwegian Authors' Union from 1968 to 1979.
