= Tobias Gedde-Dahl =

Norwegian pulmonologist

- Born: 3 June 1903; Sandsvær, Norway
- Died: 23 October 1994 (aged 91)
- Occupation: Physician
- Children: Dagfinn Gedde-Dahl
- Relatives: Målfrid Grude Flekkøy (daughter-in-law); Yngvar Ustvedt (son-in-law)

Tobias Gedde-Dahl (3 June 1903 – 23 October 1994) was a Norwegian physician (pulmonologist ). He was Sectretary General of Nasjonalforeningen for folkehelsen from 1946 to 1972. He was decorated Knight of the Order of St. Olav in 1970. Gedde-Dahl was born in Sandsvær to parish priest Sofus Gedde-Dahl and Dagny Boye. His son Truls Wilhelm was married to Målfrid Grude Flekkøy, and his daughter Lajla Margrete was married to Yngvar Ustvedt.
