= Norwegian Medical Society =

Medical organization in Norway

Logo.

The Norwegian Medical Society (Norwegian: Det norske medicinske Selskab, Latin: Societas Medica Norvegica) is a medical organisation in Norway.

It has its roots in an informal group created in 1826, which subscribed to and shared foreign medical journals. In 1833 it was formally inaugurated as Lægeforeningen i Christiania, the physician's association in Christiania. The name Norwegian Medical Society was taken in 1847.

From 1826 to 1837 it published Norway's first medical journal, Eyr, named after Eir. From 1840 to 1939 it published the journal Norsk Magazin for Lægevidenskaben, and since 2004 the journal Michael Quarterly. It also hosts symposia and debates.

== See also ==
- Norwegian Medical Association
