= Nils Yngvar Ustvedt =

Norwegian politician

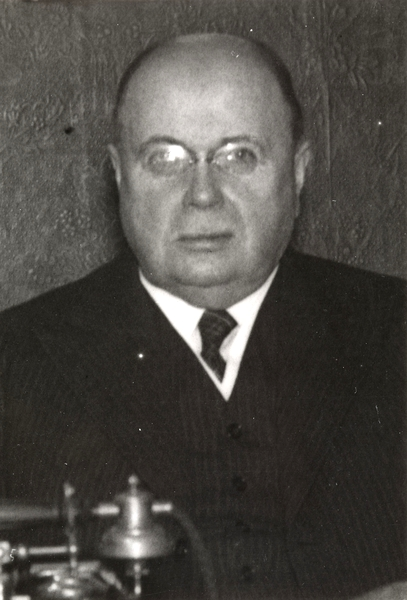
Nils Yngvar Ustvedt, c. 1938

Nils Yngvar Ustvedt (29 April 1868 – 16 October 1938) was a Norwegian medical doctor and politician for the Conservative Party. He worked as chief physician at Ullevål Hospital from 1916 to 1935, and before this he served one term in the Norwegian Parliament.

== Personal life ==
Ustvedt was born at Bjølsen in the parish of Vestre Aker. In September 1902 in Kristiania he married Hanna Mohn (1879–1928), a daughter of Jakob Mohn. He was the father of Hans Jacob Ustvedt and grandfather of Yngvar Ustvedt.

== Career ==
He took the examen artium in 1886, the cand.med. degree in 1892 and the dr.med. degree in 1900. As an academic writer he concentrated on bacteriology and epidemiology. After various jobs in the medical care of Kristiania, he was hired as a chief physician of epidemiology at Ullevål Hospital in 1916. In this position he also functioned as a lecturer at the Royal Frederick University. He stayed in this position until his retirement in 1935. Ustvedt was a member of the Norwegian Medical Society from 1898 to 1902 and 1912 to 1916, and chair from 1926 to 1928. In the Norwegian Medical Association he was a member of the board from 1921 to 1924. He was the editor of the Journal of the Norwegian Medical Association from 1921 to 1929. He was also a critic of medicinal literature in the newspaper Morgenbladet, and held a number of cultural posts, being a member of the board of the National Theatre from 1926 to 1934.

Ustvedt was also involved in politics. He was a member of Kristiania city council for two terms, from 1898 to 1904, and a member of the Norwegian Parliament from 1913 to 1915, representing the single-member constituency Uranienborg. He chaired the local party chapter in Kristiania from 1908 to 1910 and 1918 to 1919, and was a member of the central committee of the Conservative Party board from 1908 to 1911. Although he successfully defended the interests of the university, he ultimately grew discontent with the fruits of his political career. Ustvedt reportedly advised his son not to become engaged in politics, advice he followed. His son instead followed the medical path, and began working at Ullevål in 1934. Nils Yngvar Ustvedt died in October 1938 in Oslo.
