= Bergen Cathedral School =

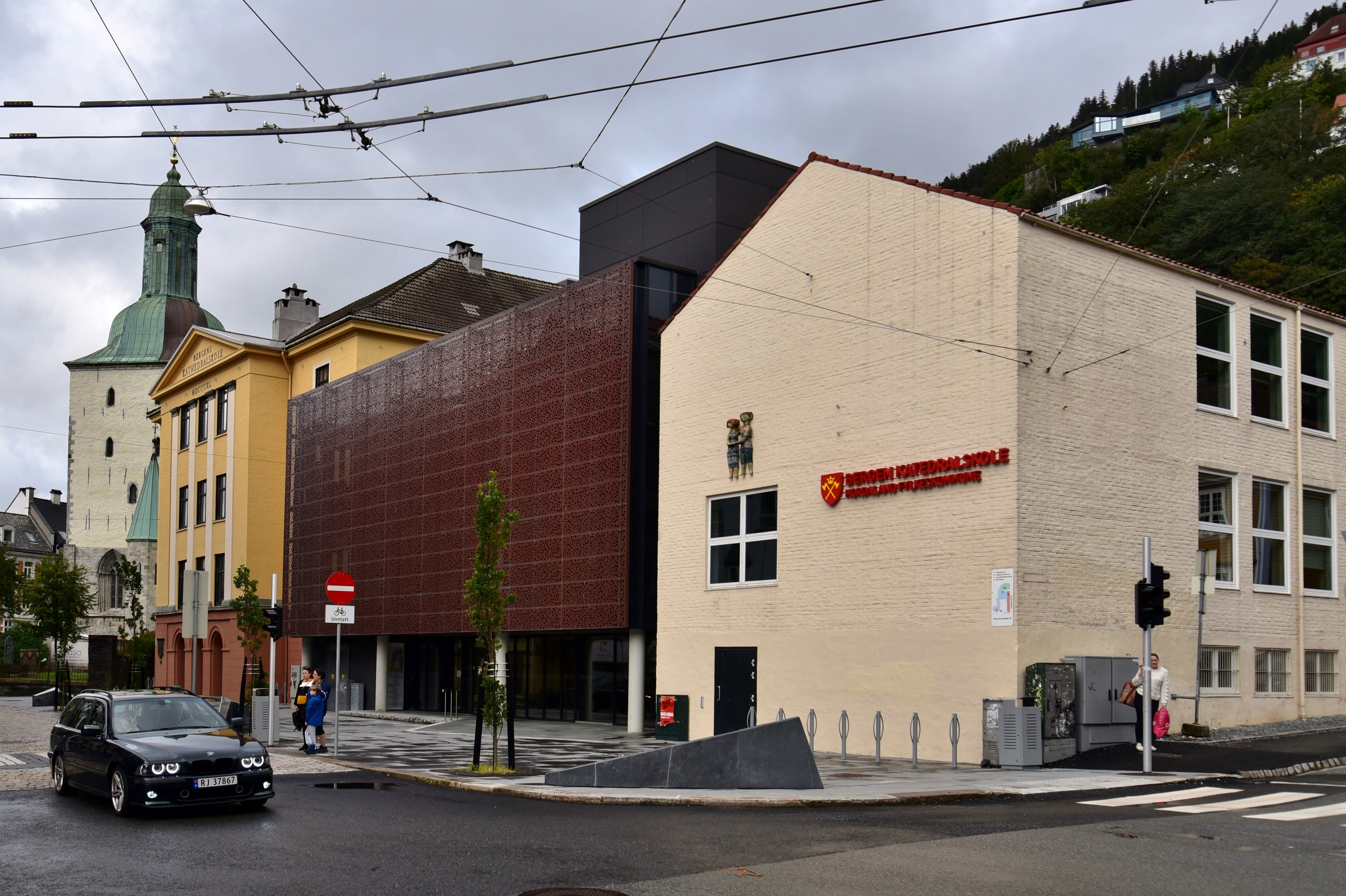

Location
- Kong Oscarsgt. 36; 5017 Bergen; Norway; 60.393134°N 5.331212°E

Information
- Type: Upper secondary school
- Motto: Ex sapientia libertas
- Established: 1153; 873 years ago
- School district: Vestland county municipality
- Head of school: Karen Kristine Rasmussen
- Staff: 95
- Grades: VG1 - VG3
- Enrollment: 850
- Campus type: Urban
- Website: https://www.bergenkatedralskole.vgs.no

Bergen Cathedral School (Norwegian: Bergen Katedralskole, Latin: Schola Cathedralis Bergensis, formerly known as Bergens lærdeskole and Bergen latinskole and colloquially known as Katten) is an upper secondary school in Bergen, Norway. Located in the city centre, next to Bergen Cathedral, the school has about 850 students, 95 full-time teachers, and 5 administration personnel, including the headmaster, Karen Kristine Rasmussen.

The school is considered to have been founded in 1153 by Nicholas Breakspear (later Pope Adrian IV), making the school the second oldest in Norway together with Oslo Cathedral School and Hamar Cathedral School, which were founded the same year, one year after the founding of Trondheim Cathedral School.

== History ==
Although the earliest written records documenting the school's existence date back to 1288, Bergen Cathedral School is believed to have been founded in 1153 by Nicholas Breakspear, who became Pope Adrian IV in 1154. It was founded as a theological school for the education of priests. Pupils would start attending the school around the age of seven. Until the school reform in 1806, the school was tied to the church.

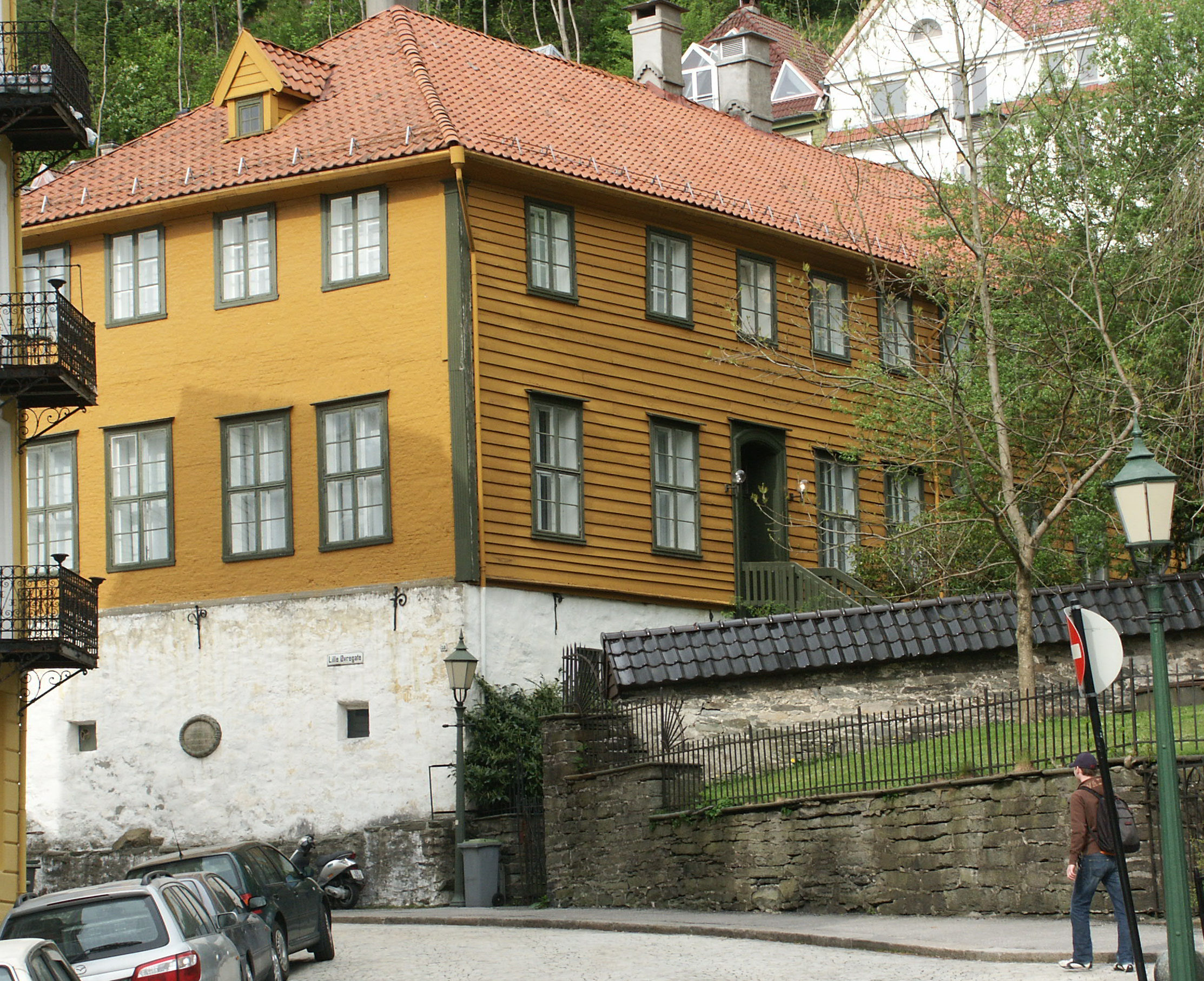
The school building of Bergen Cathedral School, then known as Bergen latinskole, until 1840.

The school moved to its present location in 1840. The original building is still in use as the offices for the administration, as well as some classrooms. This building also houses the school library. In 1869 the school's gyms were built, and the same year the school changed its name from "Bergen Latinskole" to its present "Bergen katedralskole".

The school was independent until 1896, but has been administered by the government since. In 1972, the school was made a regular upper secondary school administered by the county government.

== Buildings ==
A classrooms-only building was built in 1957. Another building, containing science laboratories, computer rooms and a cafeteria was built in 1992.

In July 2007, large amounts of mold were discovered in the building from 1840. This led to the building getting closed, resulting in a shortage of teacher offices. The building contains several old classrooms, an auditorium and the school library, which is the oldest library known in Norway. For a while, the school administration considered delaying the start of the term, but this did not happen as the teachers and the day-time adult education classes ended up moving into temporary barracks in the schoolyards of Bergen Cathedral School and Tanks Upper Secondary School. In February 2008, it was decided that the building would be renovated at a price of 6 million NOK as a temporary solution that would last until at least 2014.

From 2016 to 2017, the original building was closed for renovation and an additional building was being added between it and the classroom wing. The administration, the school library and some classes were temporarily located at the former Tanks school.

== Academics ==
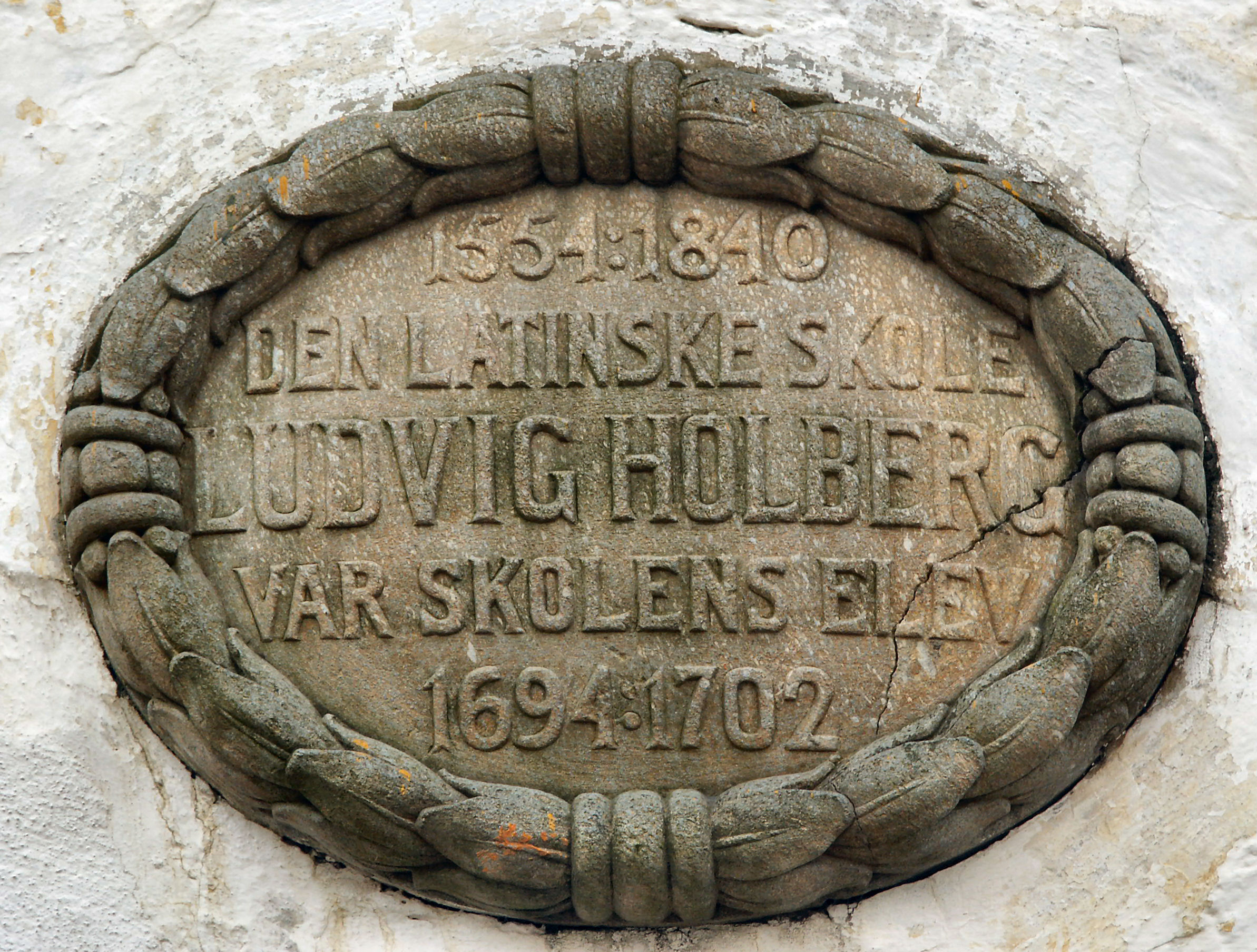
This plaque on the oldest extant school building in Lille Øvregaten states that Ludvig Holberg was a student here (1694 to 1702)

Of the mainline courses offered in Norwegian upper secondary schools, only the generalist line, studiespesialisering, is offered by Bergen Cathedral School. The school is the only one in Bergen offering the IB Diploma Programme, from which about forty students graduate per year. In the 2005–2006 school year, the senior year students of Bergen Cathedral School received the third best grades in Western Norway, which was the highest achieving region of Norway. The school has a reputation as a prestigious school, because of its history and high grade requirements.

== Notable people ==
=== Alumni ===
A number of the most famous alumni in the history of the school are engraved in a plaque in the old building from 1840:

- Gjeble Pederssøn (c. 1490–1557), bishop
- Absalon Pederssøn Beyer (1578-1575), clergyman, writer and lecturer
- Edvard Edvardsen (1630-1695), historian
- Petter Dass (1647-1707), poet
- Ludvig Holberg (1684-1754), writer, playwright and lawyer
- Hans Strøm (1726-1797), topographer
- Claus Fasting (1674-1739), merchant, mayor and historian
- Martin Vahl (1749-1804), botanist and zoologist
- Nils Hertzberg (1827-1911), politician, theologist and teacher
- Jens Zetlitz (1761-1821), poet
- Hans Jacob Grøgaard (1764-1836), priest and Eidsvoll delegate
- Christopher Frimann Omsen (1761-1829), civil servant and Eidsvoll delegate
- Lyder Sagen (1777-1850), teacher and poet
- Wilhelm Frimann Koren Christie (1778-1849), civil servant and Eidsvoll delegate
- Nicolai Wergeland (1780-1848), theologist and Eidsvoll delegate
- Edvard Hagerup (1781-1853), politician
- Christian Lassen (1800-1876), orientalist
- Georg Prahl Harbitz (1802-1889), priest and politician
- Michael Sars (1805-1869), theologian and biologist
- Frederik Stang (1808-1884), Prime Minister
- Johann Sebastian Welhaven (1807-1873), poet and critic
- Ludvig Kristensen Daa (1809-1877), politician, historian and journalist
- Ole Bull (1810-1880) violinist and composer
- Johan Fritzner (1812-1893), priest and lexicographer
- Peter Andreas Jensen (1812-1867), priest and writer
- Sven Brun (1812-1894), priest
- Ole Irgens (1829-1906), teacher and politician
- Peter Waage (1833-1900), chemist
- Jacob Worm-Müller (1834-1889), physiologist
- Henrik Mohn (1835-1916), meteorologist
- Ernst Sars (1835-1917), historian and politician
- Armauer Hansen (1841-1912), physician
- Alf Torp (1853-1916), philologist
- Gerhard Gran (1856-1925), writer
- Christian Michelsen (1857-1925), shipping magnate and Prime Minister
- Lauritz Stub Wiberg (1875-1929), actor
- Harald Sæverud (1897-1992), composer
- Helge Ingstad (1899-2001), polar explorer, lawyer, Governor of Norwegian Occupied East Greenland 1932-33
- Nordahl Grieg (1902-1943), poet, novelist, dramatist, and journalist
- Johan Nielsen (1885-1963), Norwegian sailor priest with an outstanding history and footprint from South American to the Far East.
- Per Hysing-Dahl (1920-1989), politician

=== Other notable alumni ===
- Johan Koren Christie (1814–1885), writer
- Hartvig Lassen (1824-1897), editor and historian
- Jonas Lie (1833-1908), writer
- Wollert Konow (1845-1924), Prime Minister
- Hans Gerhard Stub (1849-1931), Church Bishop
- Elizabeth Stephansen (1872-1961) mathematician and the first Norwegian woman earning a PhD in Mathematics.
- Elise Stoltz (1872 – 1931) doctor and the first female leader of the student society Hugin at Bergen Cathedral School.
- Arnulf Øverland (1889-1968), writer
- Sverre Steen (1898-1983), historian.
- Knut Fægri (1909-2001) botanist and palaeoecologist
- Kaare Meland (1915-2002), politician
- Gunnvor Rundhovde (1918-1987), Professor of Nordic languages at the University of Bergen
- Ingrid Espelid Hovig (1924–2018) TV-chef and author
- Georg Johannesen (1931-2005), writer and academic
- Narve Bjørgo (1936-), academic
- Ole D. Mjøs (1939-), academic
- Jarle Aarbakke (1942-), academic
- Gunnar Staalesen (1947-), writer
- Ingelin Killengreen (1947-), lawyer and Norway's first police commissioner
- Siri Hustvedt (1955-), writer
- Gabriel Fliflet (1958-), musician
- Harald Tveit Alvestrand (1959-), computer scientist
- Karoline Krüger (1970-), singer & pianist
- Heikki Holmås (1972-), politician
- Tore Eikeland (1990-2011) politician and youth party leader of AUF in Hordaland, killed at Utøya
- Merethe Lindstrøm (1963-), author, winner of Nordic Council's Literature Prize 2012

=== Staff ===
- Hans Holmboe (1798-1868)
- Johan Koren Christie (1814–1885)
- Emanuel Mohn (1842-1891)
- Gerhard Gran (1856-1925)
- Ahlert Hysing (1793–1879)

== See also ==
- List of the oldest schools in the world

== Other sources ==
- Hartvedt, Gunnar Hagen (1994). Bergen Byleksikon. Kunnskapsforlaget. ISBN 82-573-0485-9.
- Kurt Seim (2003). "Katten jubileer" (in Norwegian). Bergens Tidende. Archived from the original on 2007-09-30.
- Lysne, David W. (1993). Bergen Katedralskole gjennom 840 år. Et kort streiftog gjennom en lang skolehistorie.
- Gjesdal, Carl O. Gram (1978). Omkring kunnskapens kastanjetre : en mannsalder med Bergen katedralskole.
