= Bjølsen Valsemølle =

Norwegian grain-milling company in Oslo

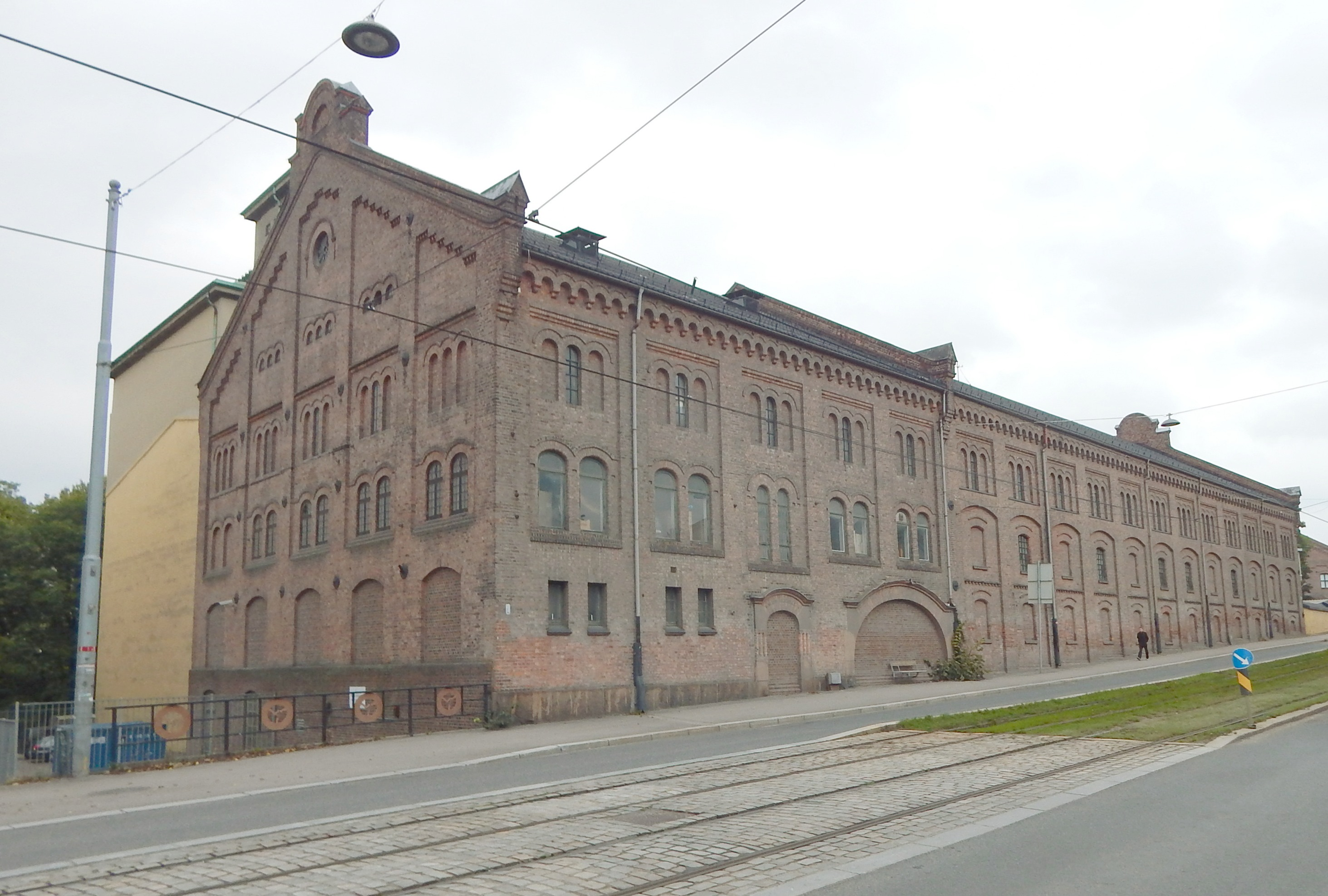
- Company type: Aksjeselskap
- Industry: Grain milling
- Founded: 1884
- Headquarters: Bjølsen, Oslo, Norway
- Products: Flour, grain products
- Owner: Lantmännen

Bjølsen Valsemølle, formally Lantmännen Cerealia AS, is a grain-milling company in Oslo. Founded in 1884, it developed into one of Norway's leading grain processors and is the business that has had production by the Akerselva the longest.

Through expansions and acquisitions along the Akerselva, the company became one of Norway's leading mills, eventually gathering the river's milling industry under it. In 1986 it became part of Nora Industrier, and after the 1991 merger of Nora and Orkla, Orkla became the owner. In 1999 ownership passed to the Swedish company Cerealia, which changed its name to Lantmännen Cerealia in 2008.

== Bibliography ==
- Nordvik, Helge (ed.); Hovland, Edgar; Malmstrøm, Kari Hoel; Nerheim, Gunnar (1984). Bjølsen Valsemølle A/S og mølleindustriens utvikling 1884–1984. Universitetsforlaget.
