= Framo AS =

Norwegian supplier of pumps and related products for the commercial oil industry

- Type: Public company
- Industry: Pumping Systems
- Founded: 1938
- Headquarters: Florvåg, Norway
- Key people: Martijn Bergink (CEO)
- Products: Submerged cargo pumps Oil-recovery equipment Offshore pumping systems
- Revenue: NOK 3 billion (2003)
- Number of employees: 1,232
- Website: www.framo.no

Framo AS marketed under the brand name Framo is a supplier of submerged cargo pumps to the tanker market. The company was founded in 1938 and is located outside Bergen, Norway. The portfolio of products include submerged cargo pumps, transportable pumping systems, oil-recovery equipment, anti-heeling systems and offshore pumping systems. All of their products are manufactured in Norway.

The company was founded by Frank Mohn (1916–2002). Since 2014, Framo has been owned by Alfa Laval.

== Subsidiaries ==
Framo AS is a parent company. This company does the overall administrative work and sales. The products are manufactured in different subsidiaries.

- Frank Mohn Fusa AS: "Marine Division" is the largest company in the Frank Mohn group. It located in Fusa in Bjørnafjorden Municipality outside Bergen. Framo Fusa's range of products includes: cargo pumping systems, transportable pumping system and anti-heeling pumping systems.
- Frank Mohn Flatøy AS: "Oil and gas division" is located on the island of Flatøy in Alver Municipality outside Bergen. Framo Flatøy's range of products includes: Water injection pumps and systems, fire water pumps, seawater lift pumps, cavern pumps, portable pumps, oil recovery equipment and pumping systems for subsea applications.
- Frank Mohn Services AS: is located in next to the main offices in Florvåg, in Askøy Municipality just outside Bergen. The company does maintenance and fixes broken pumps for clients from all over the world.
- Frank Mohn Piping: Newest company in the Frank Mohn family. Located at Hjertås in Alver Municipality, the company has the responsibility for the pipes in the Framo system.
- Framo Engineering: (Now known as OneSubsea Processing) Specializes in high-tech subsea equipment for the oil and gas business. HQ at Sandsli in Bergen Municipality and an assembly and test facility at Horsøy. Framo Engineering was first partially acquired by Schlumerberger (now SLB) in 2007 who also bought the remaining stocks from Frank Mohn AS in 2011.

In addition to these companies, Frank Mohn AS has offices located abroad:

- Frank Mohn Nederland BV in Spijkenisse, Netherland.
- Frank Mohn Houston Inc in Houston, Texas in the United States.
- Frank Mohn do Brasil Ltda in Rio de Janeiro, Brazil.
- Frank Mohn Singapore Ptd. Ltd. outside Tuas, Singapore.
- Frank Mohn AS Sweden Office in Askim, Sweden.
- Frank Mohn Nippon K.K. in Tokyo, Japan.
- Frank Mohn Korea Office (Chang San Engineering Ltd.) in Pusan, South Korea.
- FM China Ltd. in Shanghai, China

== Other activities ==
- Frank Mohn AS is the main sponsor for the handball teams, Tertnes I.L. and Fyllingen I.L.
- Frank Mohn AS has contributed to the financing of the indoor sports-facilities like Vestlandshallen and Framohallen.
- Mohn Westlake Foundation, a charity registered in England and Wales (no. 1170045) by Marit Mohn and Stian Westlake "following the sale of their share in the family company, Frank Mohn AS of Norway."
