= Tryvandshøiden (station) =

Planned railway station in Oslo, Norway

General information
- Location: Tryvannshøyden, Aker; Norway
- Line: Holmenkollen Line

Construction
- Structure type: At-grade

History
- Opened: Never

Tryvandshøiden (also Tryvannshøgda, Tryvann and Øvreseter (Note: The station was never opened and did thus not have an official name. Most sources use "Tryvandshøiden", since that was the name of Tryvannshøyden at that time.)) was a planned station on the Holmenkollen Line in Oslo, Norway. It was planned by the company Tryvandsbanen in the early 1910s and partly constructed in 1916 at the end of a single-tracked line from Frognerseteren. A red signalman's house named "Norden" was the station's only facility. Passenger trains never served the station, and the tracks from Frognerseteren to Tryvandshøiden were removed in 1939. The signalman's house was not demolished. In 1993, 2004 and 2008, proposals were made to re-open the station so that it would be more convenient for Oslo residents to use the Tryvann Ski Resort. However, these proposals were all rejected by the operator Oslo Sporveier on the grounds that the extension would be too expensive.

== History ==
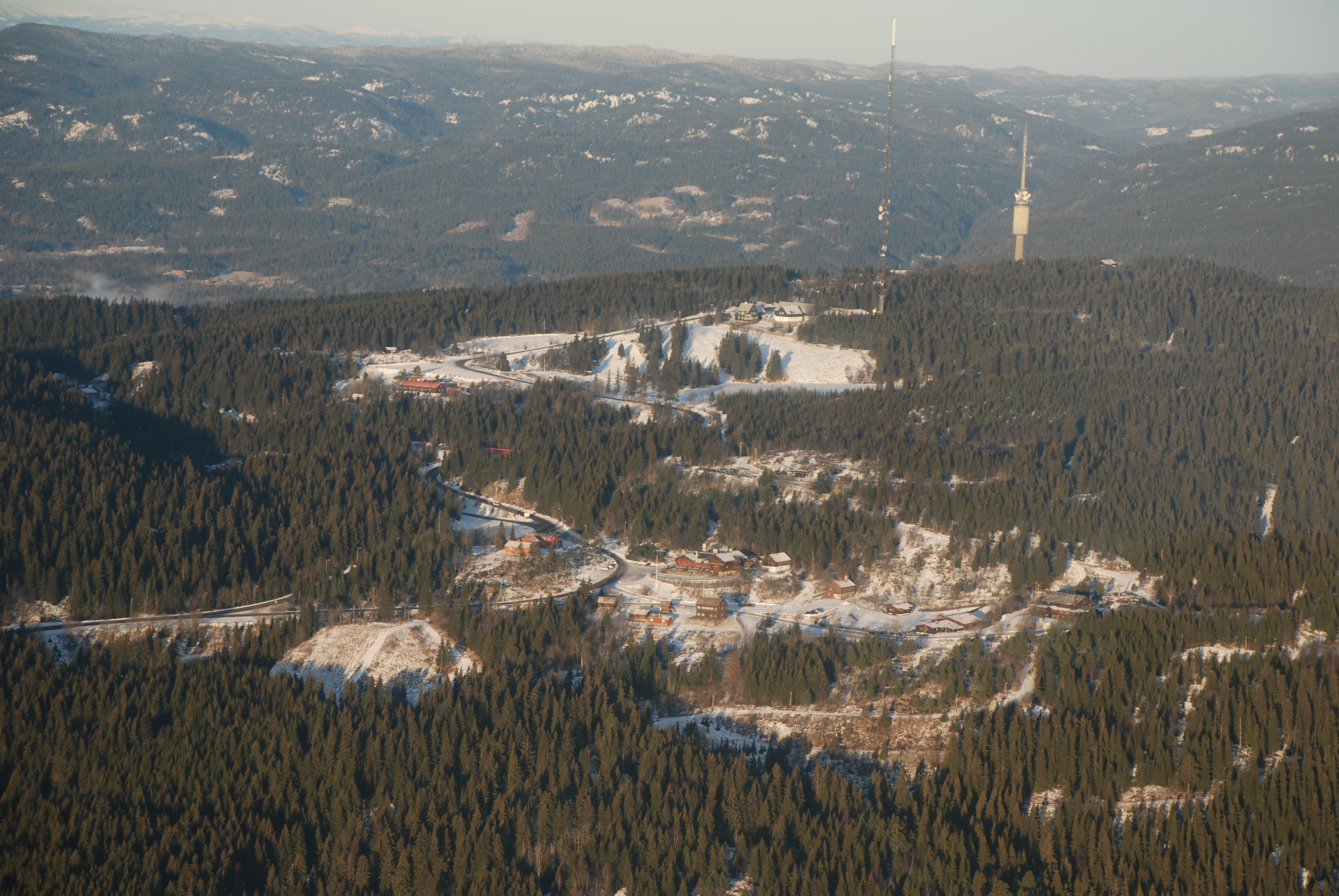
Tryvannshøyden seen from high ground

In 1898, Holmenkolbanen opened the Holmenkollen Line from Majorstuen to Besserud station (then Holmenkollen). In 1910–11, a recently established company named Tryvandsbanen planned to extend the line towards Frognerseteren and Tryvannshøyden. The company extended the line from Besserud to Tryvandshøiden station on 15 May 1916. The line was double-tracked to Frognerseteren and single-tracked from there to Tryvandshøiden, as only the first section had passenger traffic. The single-tracked line from Frognerseteren to Tryvandshøiden was 800 metres (2,600 ft) long and ran in a curve east of Øvresetertjern. The extension was financed partly by Tryvandsbanen's equity, and partly by loans from the Municipality of Oslo.

In the 1930s, the Municipality of Oslo made plans for making Tryvann the "Davos of the North", following the opening of Tryvann stadion in the winter of 1936. The Holmenkollen Line was planned to be extended even further, from Tryvandshøiden station to a proposed hotel with 200 beds. This never happened, since the skating rinks at Øvresetertjern were too cold and windy to become popular among Oslo residents.

Even though Tryvandsbanen had prepared the Frognerseteren–Tryvandshøiden Line for an upgrade to double tracks, no action was taken due to a shortage of money. The line was therefore unsuitable for regular passenger service, and Tryvandsbanen considered it to be useless. The tracks from Tryvandshøiden station to a point some 200 metres (660 ft) ahead of Frognerseteren station were removed in 1939. In the 1960s, the right-of-way was gravelled over and converted into a rail trail.

=== Reopening ===
In 1993, proposals were made to re-open the line to Tryvandshøiden Station, so that the Tryvann Ski Resort would be more accessible to Oslo residents. Oslo Sporveier, the operator, turned down the proposals, arguing that it would cost about 3 billion NOK to lay the tracks and put up overhead line equipment, and that it would not attract enough passengers.

In 2004, the writer Erling Fossen gathered 356 signatures in favor of extending the line to the ski resort, which were given to the Oslo City Council. Even though the proposal was supported by the prominent council members Peter N. Myhre, Ola Elvestuen and Rune Gerhardsen, Oslo Sporveier declined, stating that the extension of the line would not be profitable enough.

Peter N. Myhre stated in 2008 that the line would be extended to the ski resort before the FIS Nordic World Ski Championships 2011, but no action was taken as neither Ruter nor the city council wanted to allocate the required 150 million NOK.

== Facilities and services ==
A red-painted house for the signalman was put up close to the station. Tryvandsbanen also developed plans for building a station house with a waiting shed, but these never materialised. The name of the red-painted house was changed from Nordpolen ("The North Pole") to Norden ("The North") and it was modernised after the removal of the tracks. The station was included on the Nordmarka maps published in 1913 and 1938.

The station was never served by passenger trains, but between 1914 and 1918 Norway Telecom (now Telenor) used the line for transporting steel when Tryvannstårnet was being constructed. Occasionally charter trips to Øvresetertjern for passengers were also arranged.
