= Venues of the 1952 Winter Olympics =

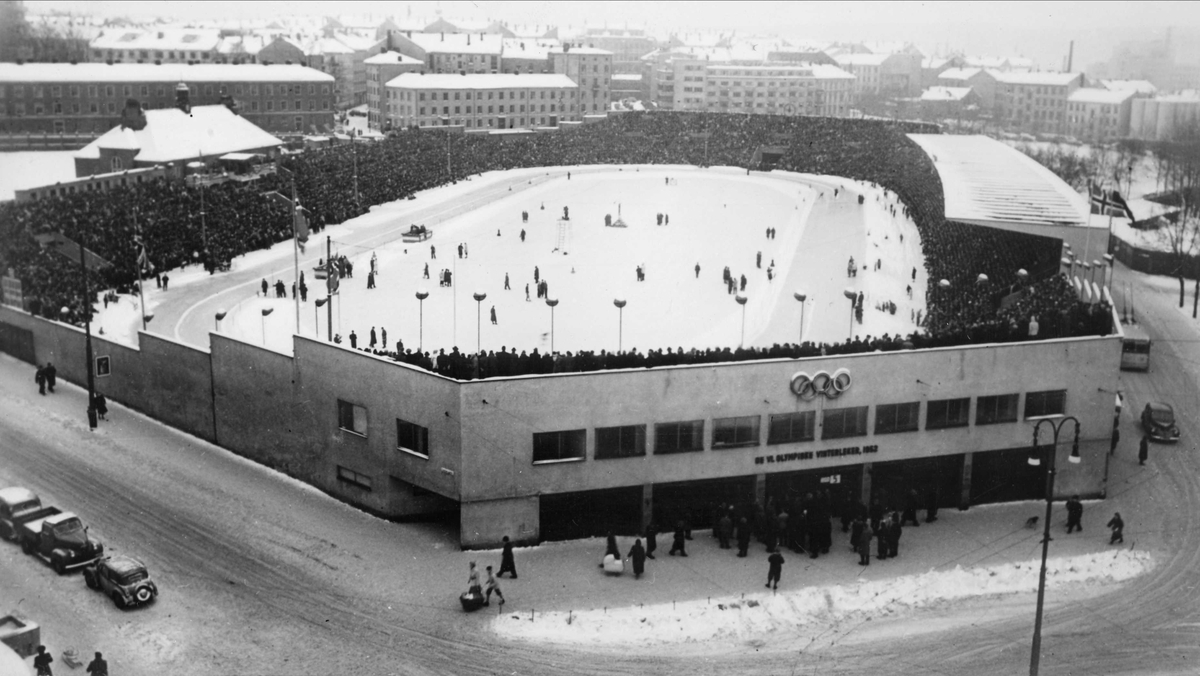
Bislett stadion during the Olympics

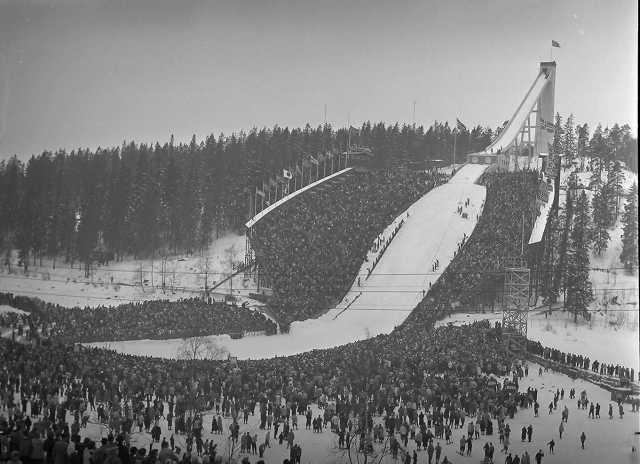
Holmenkollbakken two weeks after the Olympics

The 1952 Winter Olympics were held in and around Oslo, Norway, from 14 to 25 February 1952. Ten competition and eight non-competition venues were used, in addition to three designated, but unused, reserve competition venues. Six of the competition venues were located in Oslo, while one each was located in Bærum, Skedsmo, Drammen and Krødsherad. Bislett stadion was the centerpiece of the games, hosting the opening and closing ceremonies, the speed skating and the figure skating. Bislett featured both a 400-meter (1,300 ft) circumference speed skating track and a 60-meter (200 ft) long rink used for figure skating, separated by snow banks. Two reserve venues were designated for the skating events, Tryvann stadion in Oslo and Hamar stadion in Hamar.

Jordal Amfi, an outdoor artificial ice rink, was built with a capacity for 10,000 spectators. This allowed ice hockey to be played on artificial ice for the first time at the Olympics. Of the tournament's 36 matches, 23 were played at Jordal, while the remaining were played at Kadettangen in Bærum, Dælenenga idrettspark in Oslo, Lillestrøm stadion in Skedsmo and Marienlyst stadion in Drammen.

The ski jumping, cross-country skiing and Nordic combined events were held at Holmenkollbakken, 8 kilometers (5 mi) from the city center. Although upgraded several times since its opening in 1892, the former wooden superstructure was replaced with a concrete tower and in-run ahead of the Olympics, with the out-run being extended to 87 meters (285 ft). Stands were erected to seat 13,000 people, with capacity for an additional 130,000 standing spectators at the base of the hill. Cross-country races started and ended at the base of the ski hill. A switchboard was posted at the start and finish lines to help spectators monitor the progress of the competitors during the races. Most of the stands built for the ski jumping competition had to be removed for the cross-country races. As a result, there was little room for spectators to sit and watch the cross-country events. Spectators were therefore allowed to walk within the course.

The alpine skiing events were split between Rødkleiva, located in Oslo near Holmenkollen, and Norefjell, located at Krødsherad, 113 kilometers (70 mi) from Oslo and the only venue outside Greater Oslo. Rødkleiva featured the slalom events, with an elevation difference on the hill of 200 meters (660 ft) and a course length of 480 meters (1,570 ft). Downhill and giant slalom, the latter of which was making its Olympic debut, were competed at Norefjell. Considerable construction and upgrades were made to the area to make it suitable for Olympic competition. A bridge was built across the lake of Krøderen to help with transportation concerns; a new hotel, two ski lifts, and a new road were also constructed.

There was no permanent bobsleigh run in Norway as there was very little interest in the sport. The organizers decided to build a temporary course, Korketrekkeren, out of snow, which ran down the hill from Frognerseteren, near Holmenkollen. The course was 1,508 meters (4,948 ft) long and featured 13 turns. The run was built and tested in 1951, and was rebuilt in 1952 in time for the Olympics.

== Competition venues ==
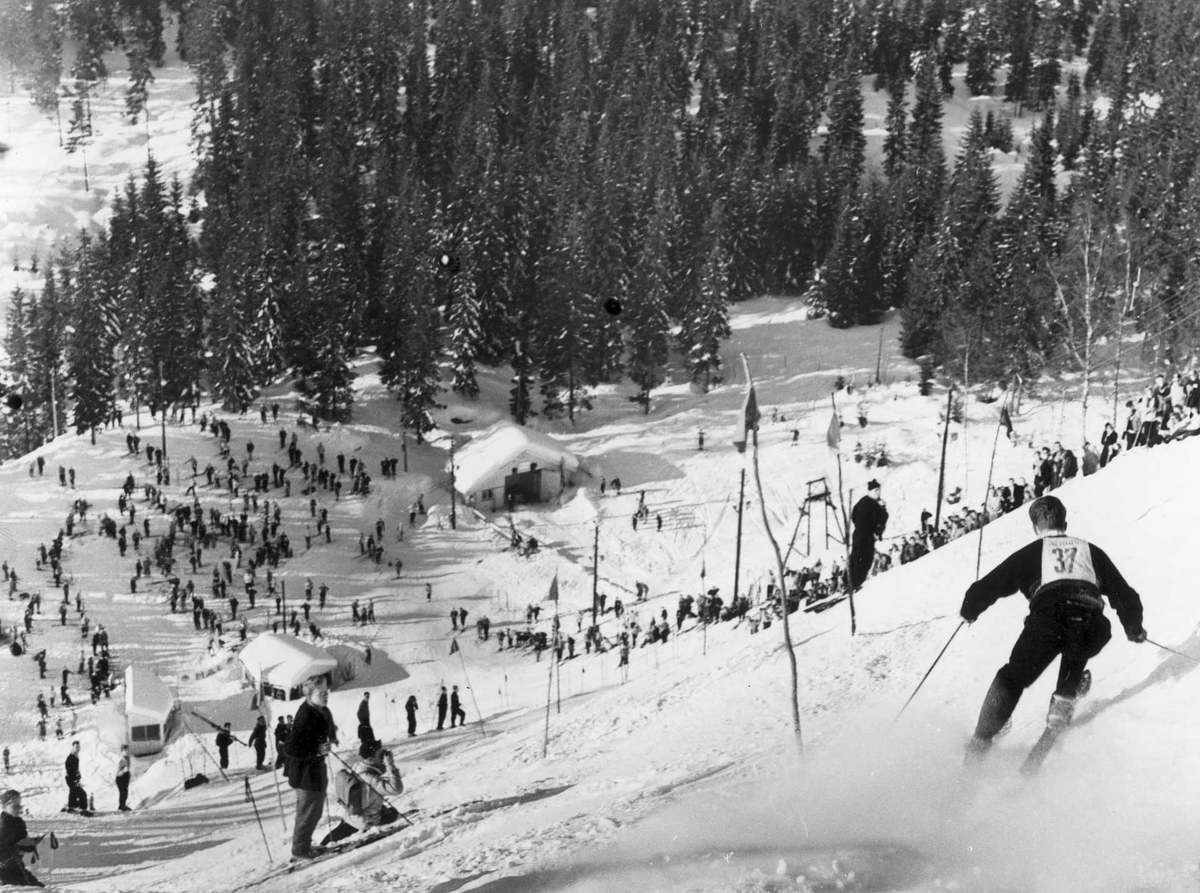
Stein Eriksen descending Rødkleiva during the men's slalom

The following list contains the ten venues used for competitions during the 1952 Winter Olympics. They are listed by their name, as well as containing the sports held at the venue, the municipality where they are located and the spectator capacity.

Competition venues
Venue	Location	Sport(s)	Capacity	Ref
Bislett stadion	Oslo	Bandy, figure skating, speed skating	27,000	
Dælenenga idrettspark	Oslo	Bandy, ice hockey	5,000	
Holmenkollbakken	Oslo	Cross-country skiing, Nordic combined, ski jumping	149,000	
Jordal Amfi	Oslo	Ice hockey	10,000	
Kadettangen	Bærum	Ice hockey	—	
Korketrekkeren	Oslo	Bobsleigh	12,000	
Lillestrøm stadion	Skedsmo	Ice hockey	—	
Marienlyst stadion	Drammen	Ice hockey	5,000	
Norefjell	Krødsherad	Downhill, giant slalom	8,000	
Rødkleiva	Oslo	Slalom	15,000	

== Reserve venues ==
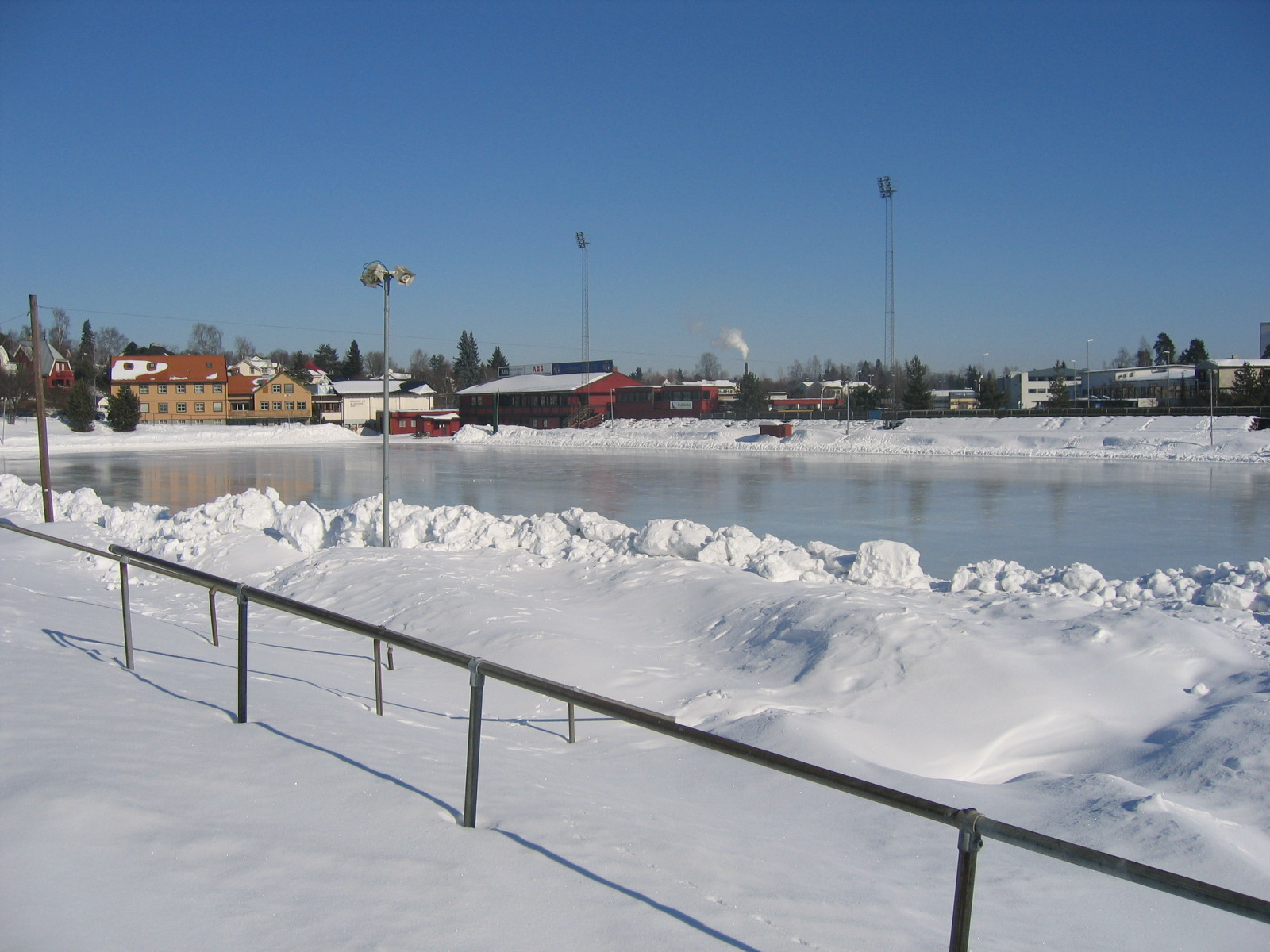
Hamar stadion in 2006

Three reserve venues were designated, should the weather not make it possible to hold events in Oslo. The following list contains the venue, the municipality they are located in, and the events for which they were designated.

Reserve venues
Venue	Location	Sports	Ref
Hamar stadion	Hamar	Ice hockey	
Tryvann stadion	Oslo	Ice hockey	
Voss	Voss	Alpine skiing	

== Non-competition venues ==
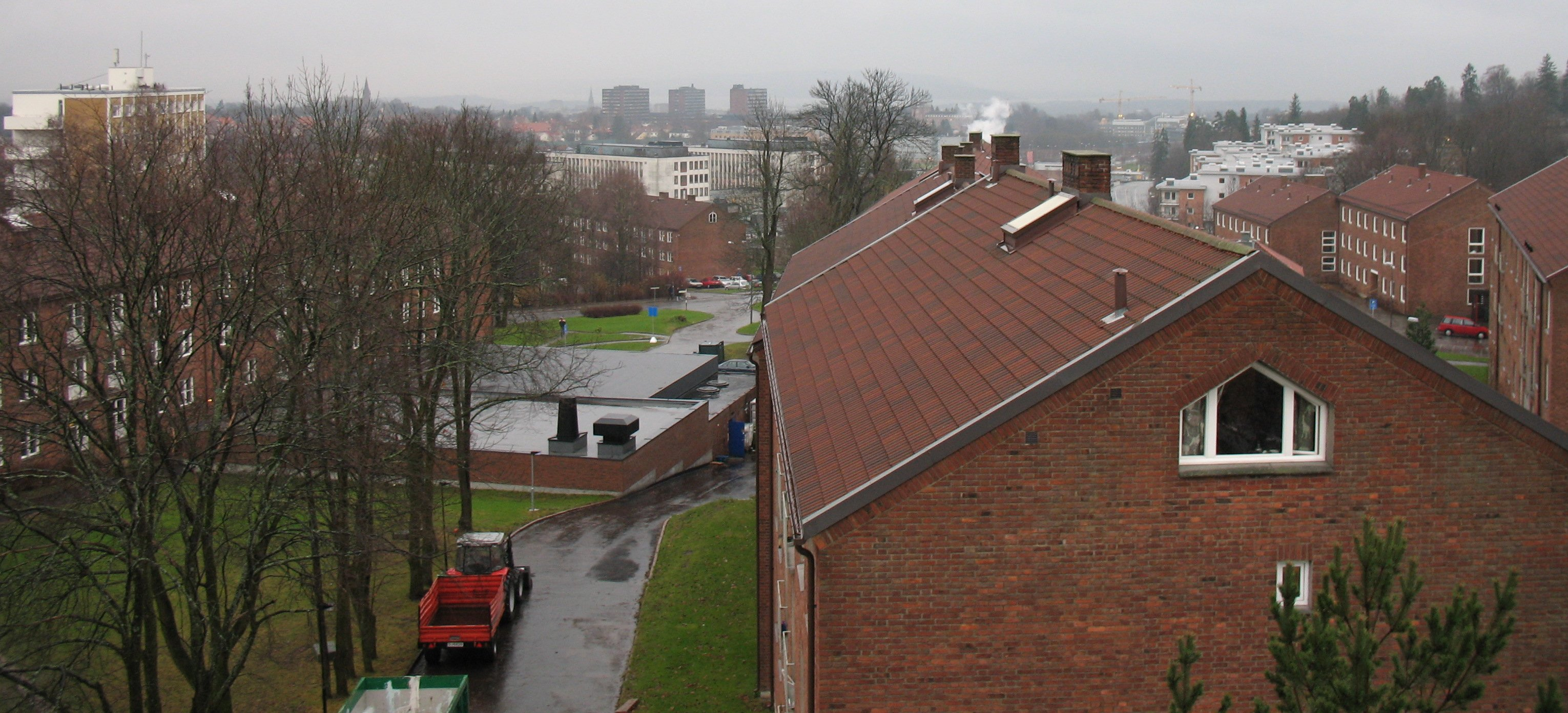
Sogn Student City in 2005

The following is a list of the eight non-competition venues for the Olympics. This includes the name of the venue, the municipality in which it is located and its purpose.

Non-competition venues
Venue	Location	Purpose	Ref
Bislett stadion	Oslo	Opening and closing ceremonies	
Fjeldhvil Hotel	Krødsherad	Billeting quarters (participants)	
Hotel Viking	Oslo	Billeting quarters (media)	
Ila	Oslo	Billeting quarters (participants)	
Norefjellstua	Krødsherad	Billeting quarters (participants)	
Sandum Seter	Krødsherad	Billeting quarters (participants)	
Sogn Student City	Oslo	Billeting quarters (participants)	
Ullevål University Hospital	Oslo	Billeting quarters (participants)	

== Post-Olympic use ==
Bislett remained a speed skating venue until 1988, after which it only hosted athletics and football. Between 1925 and 1986, it saw 13 world championships and 10 European championships in speed skating. The structure was demolished and replaced with a new stadium in 2005. It hosts the annual Bislett Games, now part of the Diamond League in athletics. Marienlyst is used as a football stadium, and hosts both Strømsgodset IF and the Norway national under-21 football team. Lillestrøm, Dælenenga and Kadettangen are only used for lower-level football, as they lack any significant spectator stands. Jordal Amfi received a roof in 1972 and hosted the World Ice Hockey Championships in 1958 and 1999. Holmenkollbakken has been rebuilt several times since the Olympics; most recently it was entirely rebuilt in 2010. The complex has received a ski stadium, collectively known as Holmenkollen National Arena. In addition to the annual Holmenkollen Ski Festival, the hill hosted the FIS Nordic World Ski Championships in 1930, 1966, 1982 and 2011.
