= Øvresetertjern =

Lake in Oslo, Norway

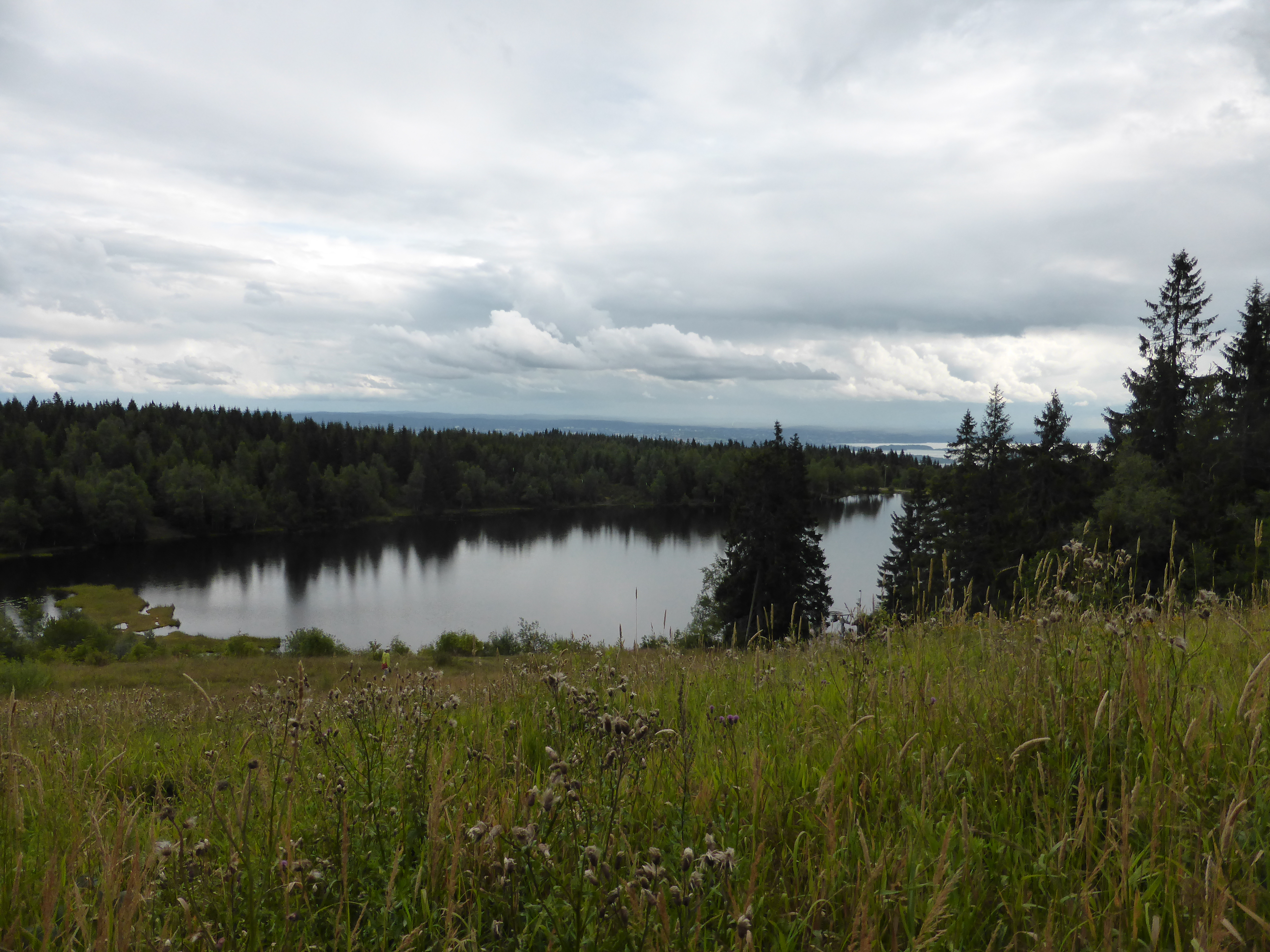
- Øvresetertjern (2014)

- Location within Norway
- Location: Oslo, Norway
- Coordinates: 59°58′57″N 10°40′19″E
- Basin countries: Norway
- Surface elevation: 477 m (1,565 ft)

Øvresetertjern is a lake in Oslo, Norway. It is located 477 metres (1,565 ft) over sea level between the top of the hill Tryvannshøyden and Frognerseteren. From 1916 to 1938, the station Tryvandshøiden was located north of the lake, but it was never served by regular passenger trains.

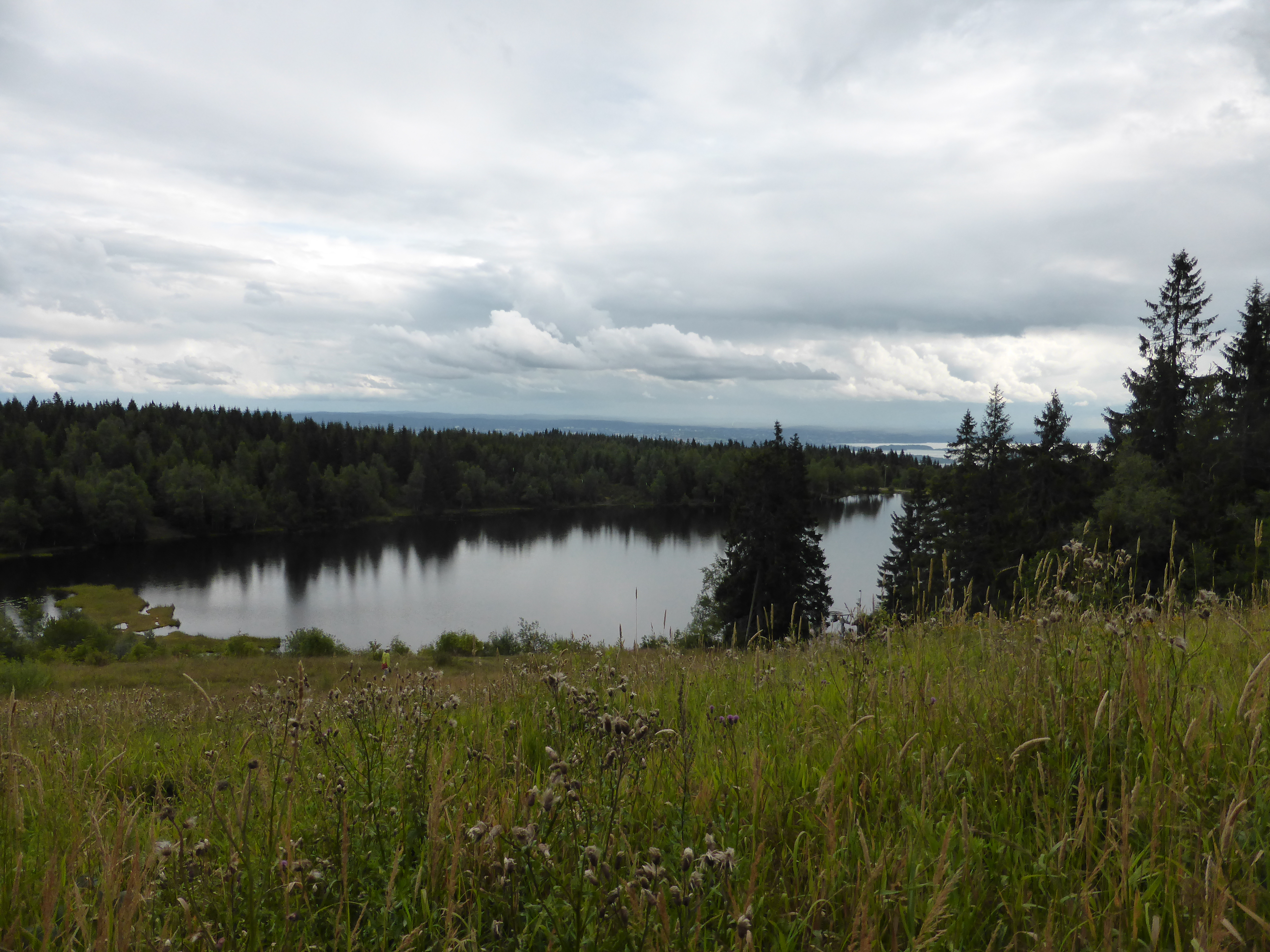
Øvresetertjern (2014)

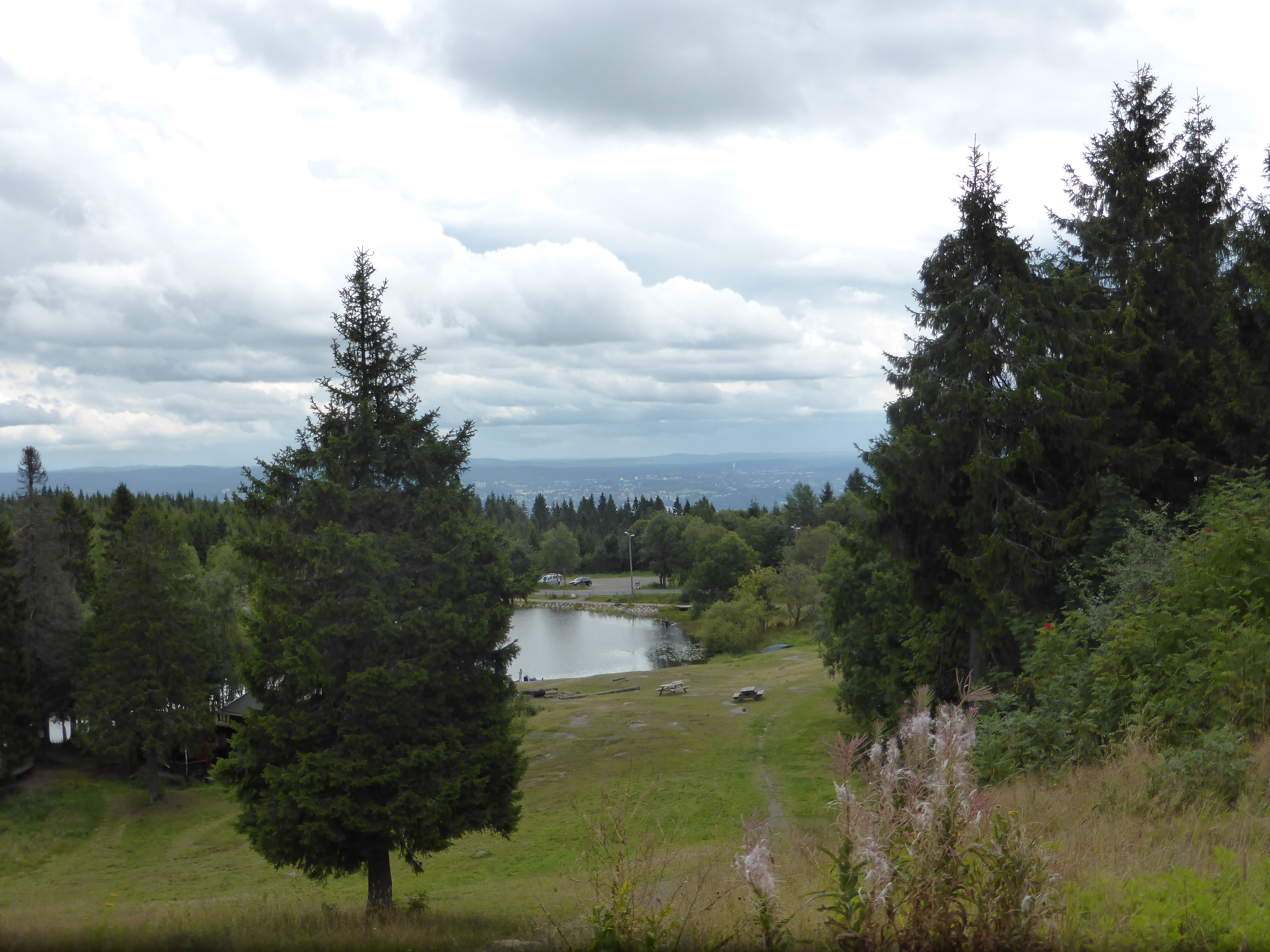
