= Sogn Studentby =

Residential area in Oslo

Sogn Studentby Sogn studentby
- Student village
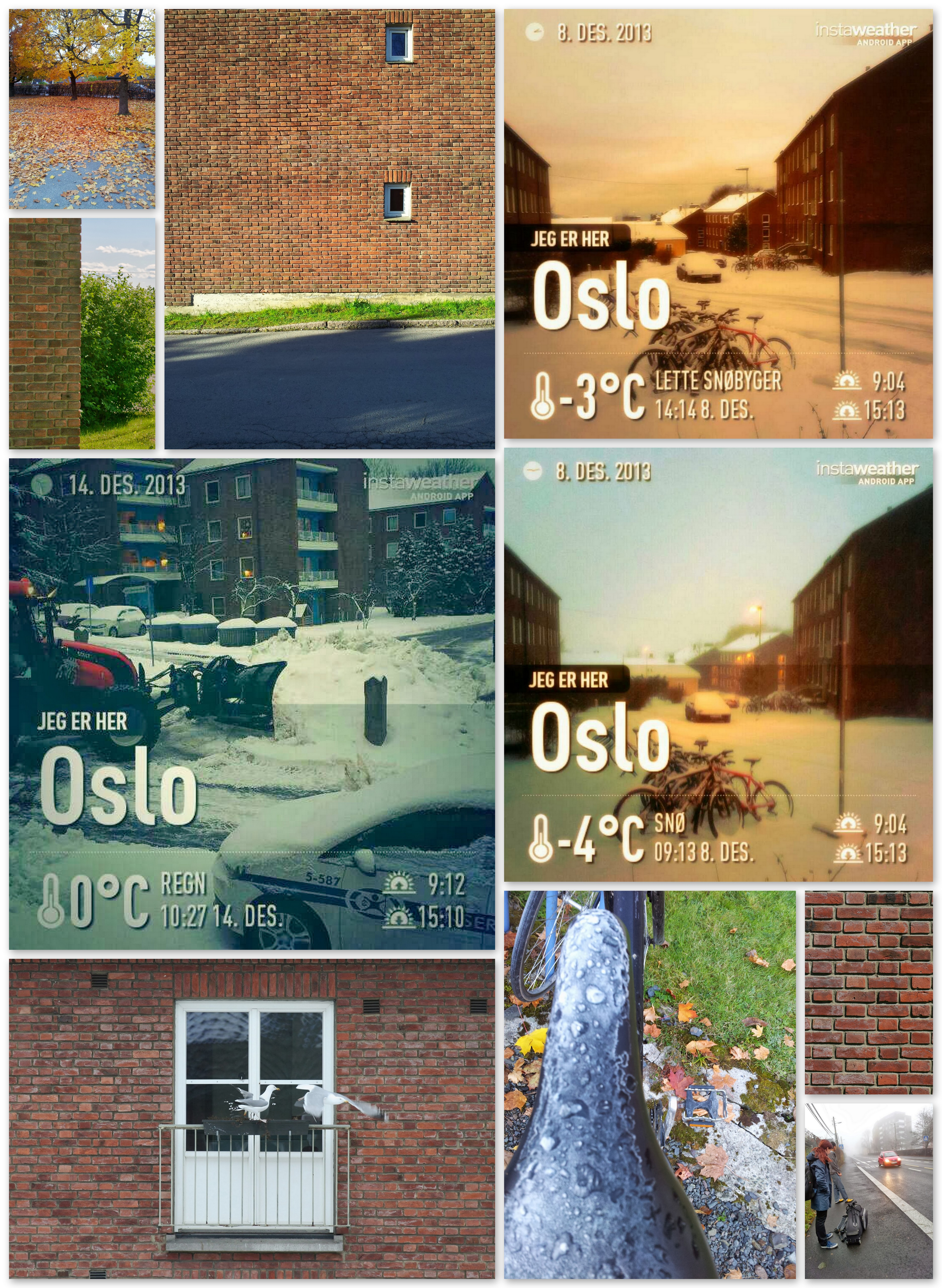
- The Seasons at Sogn Studentby.
- Nickname: Sogn
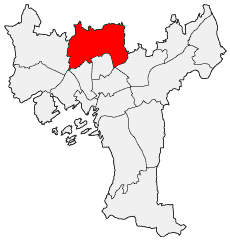
- Location in Oslo

- Location in Norway
- Coordinates: 59°57′8.76″N 10°43′43.66″E
- Country: Norway
- County: Oslo
- Kommune: Oslo
- District: Nordre Aker
- Sogn studentby: 1952
- Founder: Studentsamskipnaden i Oslo

Government
  - Type: Student welfare organisation
  - Minister of Education and Research: Torbjørn Røe Isaksen (H)
  - Chair (SiO): Tone Vesterhus
  - Residence executive: Trond Bakke
  - CEO: Lisbeth Dyrberg
  - Chair (VT): Sigrid Mæhle Grimsrud
- Elevation: 180 m (590 ft)
- Time zone: UTC+1 (UTC+1)
- Norwegian: N-0858

Sogn Studentby (English: Sogn Student Village) is a residential area for students, located in the district of Nordre Aker, Oslo.

== Infrastructure ==
Two streets pave the way in the village for pedestrians and cars. These are Rolf E. Stenersens allé, and Jon P. Erliens vei, named after two individuals that played a role in the early days of the village. There is access by paved road to the village from Hagtornveien and Sognsveien, as well as access on paths by foot from Almeveien, Konvallveien and Sognsveien.

== Transit ==
The two bus stops; Yrkesskolen and Solvang drive commuters to and from the University of Oslo campus Blindern (walking distance 1.3-2.3 km) by city bus 22 and 25. Both city buses 22 and 25 end at the Majorstua (15 min bus) commuter junction, but at the nearby commuter junction Ullevål Stadion (5 min walk) you can go by T-bane (engl. Subway/Metro) 3, 4 and 6, city buses 23 and 24, coach/buses 156 and 262, airport shuttle bus F3, morning bus 118 and night bus N18, it also gives you quick access from Ullevål stadion to Jernbanetorget/Oslo Senstralstasjon/Oslo Bussterminal (18 min T-Bane), Nationaltheatret (13 min T-Bane), Lysaker bru/Lysaker Stasjon/Lysaker (15 min bus), and Gardermoen (60 min bus), for train, coach/Bus or airplane connection.

== Parks and recreation ==
Part of the village is grass covered and there are traces of burial mounds dating back to the Iron Age.

Outdoor recreation
Sogn studentby is situated right in the middle of a busy traffic, but there is easy access to outdoor recreational areas. Direct access to Oslomarka is gained by paths through Damefallet via Almeveien and Gaustad Hospital via Sognsveien. But for a better and deeper access into Oslomarka you can go through excursion spot Sognsvann (15 min T-Bane), Frognerseteren (40 min T-Bane), Skar leir (30 min bus), Kjelsås Station (10 min bus), Movatn Station (30 min train), Bogstadvannet (40 min bus) and Sørkedalen skole (50 min bus). All these listed above are entry points to Nordmarka and are accessible by bus, train or T-Bane and are all inside zone 1.

Indoor recreation
The SIO also serve the nearby indoor arena Domus Athletica.

== History ==
Sognsvann is the given name of the farm estate Sogn, that was divided into 3 Sogngårder: Østre Sogn, Vestre Sogn and Lille Sogn (Nordberg).

- Lille Sogn (Little Sogn) is Nordberg.
- Østre Sogn (Eastern Sogn) buildings were demolished when Sogn Studentby was built.
- Vestre Sogn (Western Sogn) is situated inside Sogn Studentby. A farm estate of Hovedøya Abbey during the medieval period, and later the Crown until 1662. Since 1892 property of Aker and Oslo, and today SiO hosts a kindergarten in the only remaining building.
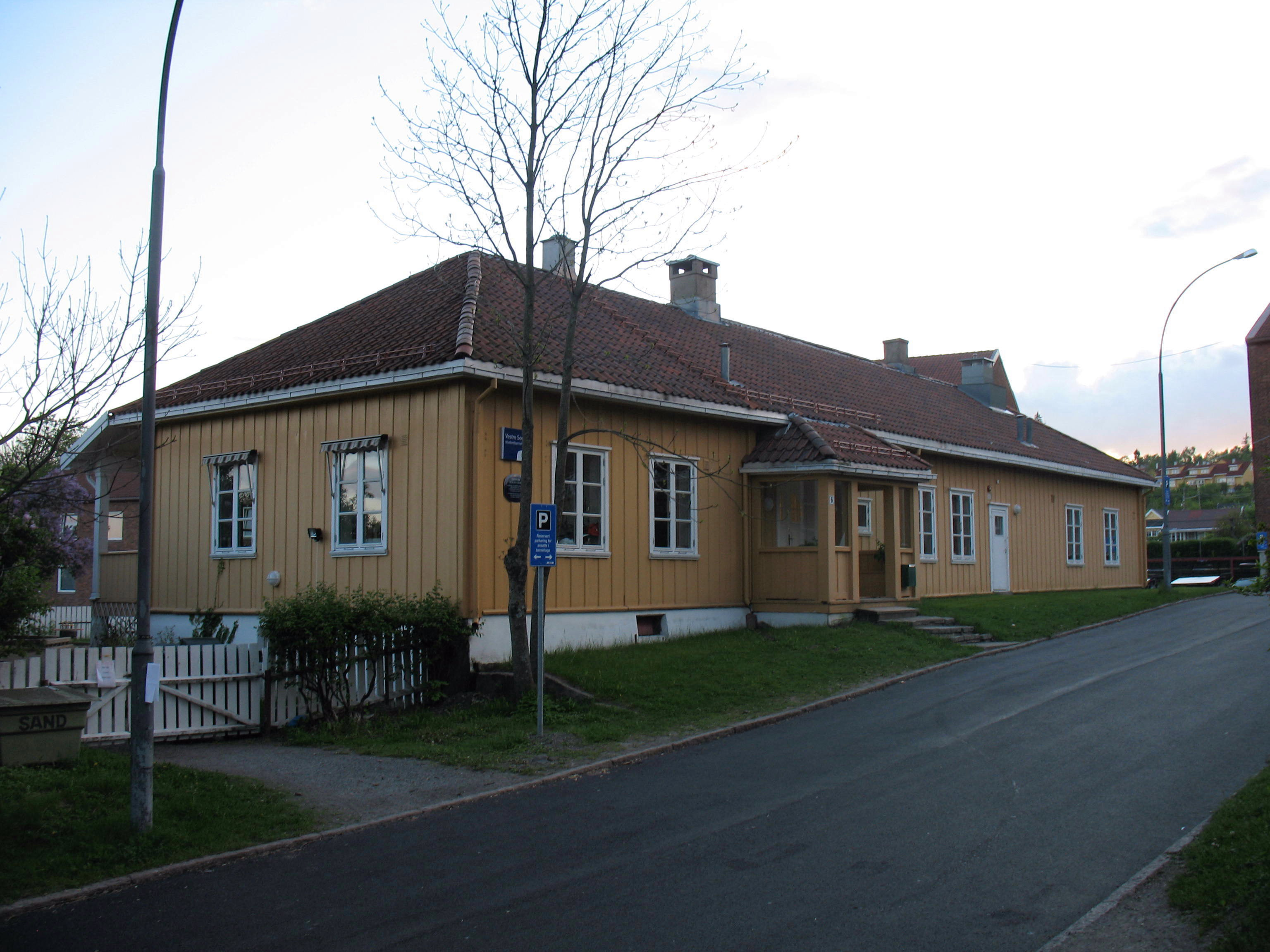
Western Sogn

== Buildings ==
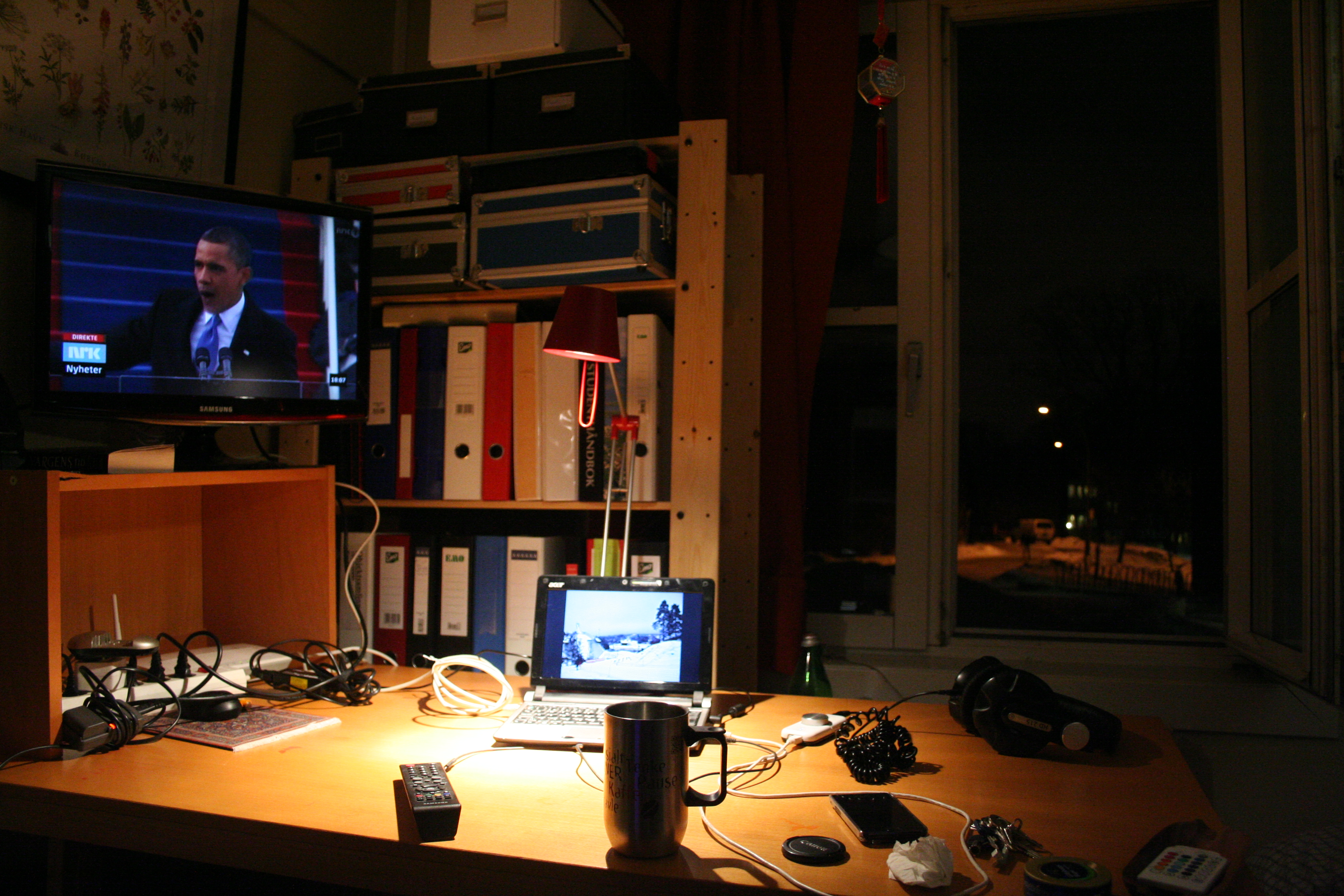
Inside a flat with open window

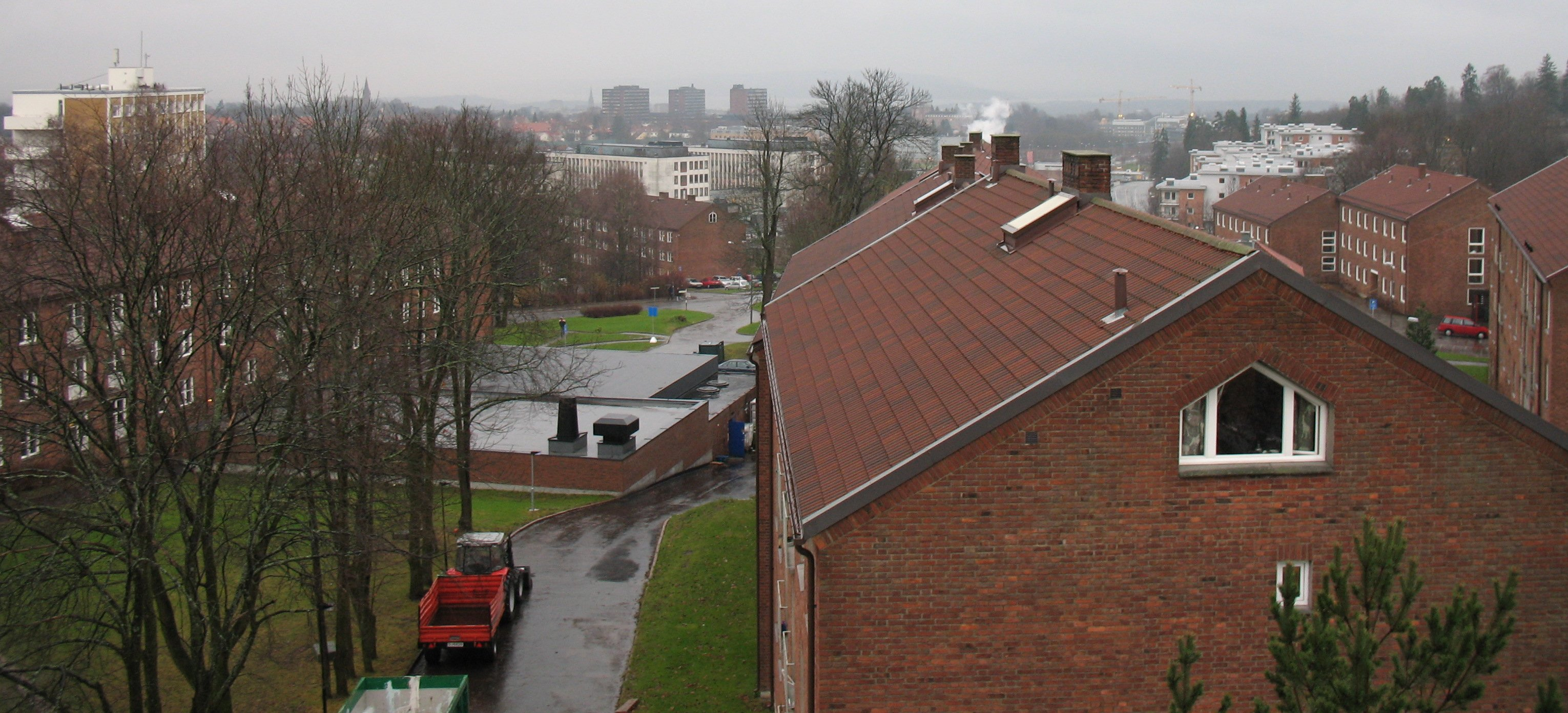
Sogn Studentby

The 16 buildings are managed and maintained by the student welfare organization, Studentsamskipnaden i Oslo og Akershus/SIO. Sogn Studentby has 1400 flats, mostly single rooms. Most flats share kitchens and bathrooms with 4-9 persons. Some of the flats are single/double with private bathroom and kitchen, and there is also flats reserved for families.

=== Amatøren ===
Sogn Studentbys own grendehus "Amatøren" has a bar run by students. Since 1998 a board of directors choose the activity level, and among the most popular activities is the movie night each Sunday as well as the quiz nights every Thursday. See also student culture.

=== Business ===
Rema 1000 operates a grocery store inside the village. SIO opened and operated one in 1953. SIO operates 3 kindergartens, and SIO central workshop inside the village.

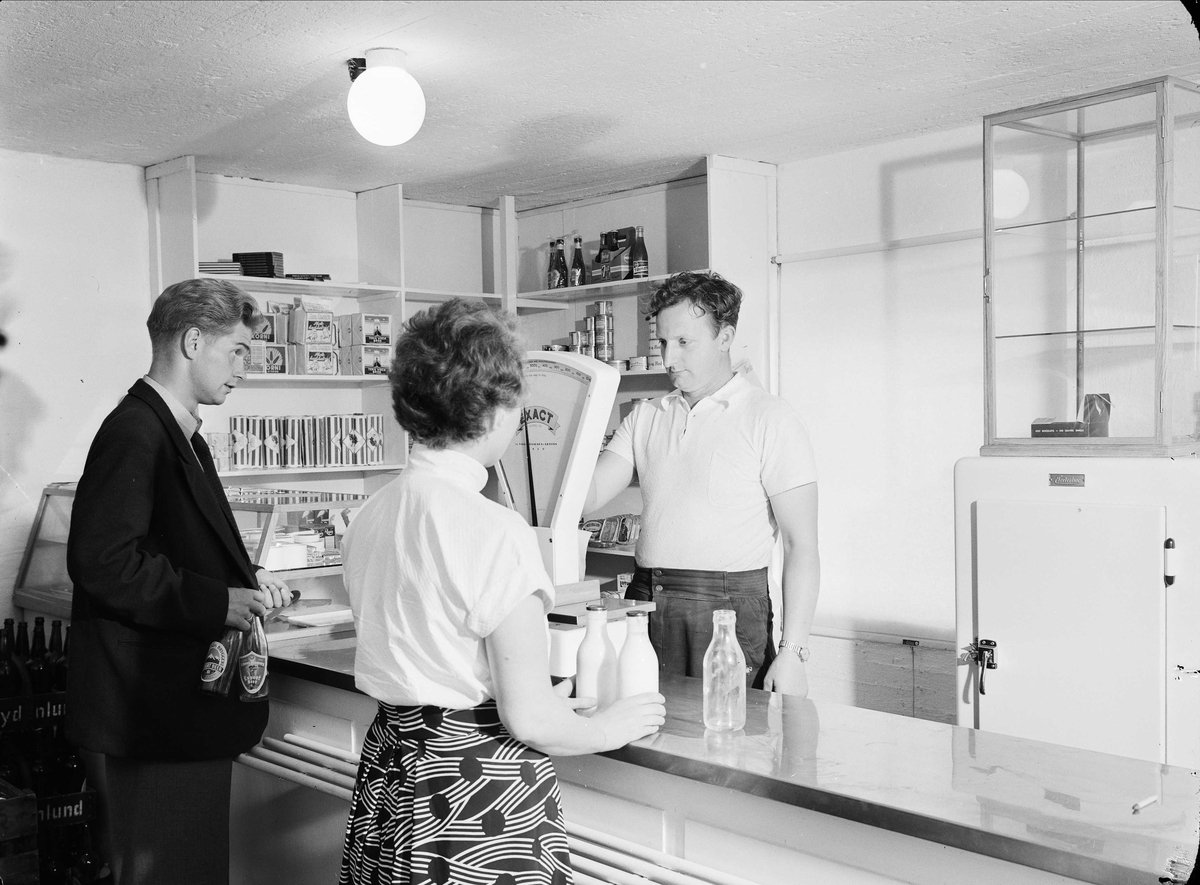
State financed grocery store at Sogn in 1953

=== The solution ===
Sogn Studentby was to be a solution for the student housing market in Oslo. From housing students in gymnasiums on mattresses, soldier barracks left over from WW2, and private flats with absurd terms, to other solutions. There was a great pressure on the student housing market, and something had to be done. SiO built much of its own competence, its capital, its organisation in the years to come. The "old" Sogn Studentby took 20 years to build while Kringsjå Studentby took 5 years. Kampen studentby never was, nor Ullevål studentby. The building of Sogn Studentby was done in stages, and financed by Den Weis-Rosenkroneske Stiftelse, municipalities throughout Norway based on how many students each municipality thought they needed to secure a place to rent, loans from Norwegian State Housing Bank, and privately with donations and loans from Storebrand. Parallel with SiO's Sogn Solution others like Nordnorsken (1946–1960) with help from Nasjonalhjelpen and the city, took some pressure of the situation. In 1953 Kristian Ottosen (SIO) figured there was 3800 students in Oslo, and that 2500 where from outside of town.

- In 1953 3,800 students were studying at SIO institutions.
- In 1988 20,000 students were studying at SIO institutions, and SIO had 3,800 flats.
- In 1998 40,000 students were studying at SIO institutions, and SIO had 4,600 flats.
- In 2001 32,610 students were studying at SIO institutions, and SIO had 5,006 flats.

August 2005 BI joined SIO August 2006 KHIO joined SIO January 2011 SIO and OAS joined forces to become the new SIO.

- In 2012 61,600 students were studying at SIO institutions, and SIO had 7,793 flats.

The "old" village
The first stage of the student village, in what is today's Jon P. Erliens vei, was completed for the 1952 Winter Olympics, and accommodated participating athletes during the games. 1952 would have been the first year Soviet participated in the Winter Olympics. Stalin's USSR counter argumented Soviet participation in the 1952 Winter Olympics with too poor conditions for Soviet athletes at Sogn. We learn this from the 2014 exhibition “The White Games. Top Secret. USSR and the Winter Games, 1956 to 1988,”. The last stage of the "old" village was completed in 1965. At least during the summer months of the years 1952–1959 Sogn Studentby wore the designation "Studentbyens Sommerhotell" (Summer Hotel). And in 1962 the International Summer School at the University of Oslo used Sogn. The Summer Hotel was open for the summer 1962 as well.

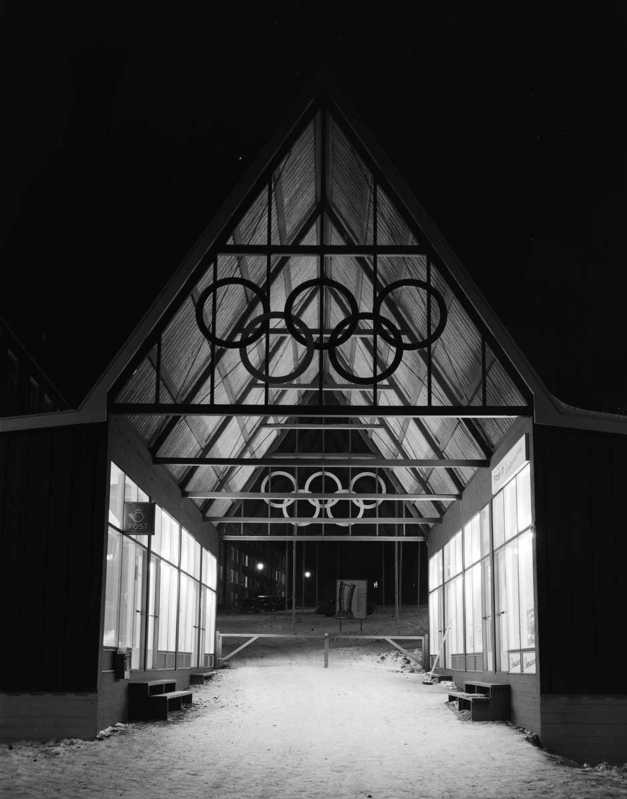
1952 Winter Olympics at Sogn Studentby.

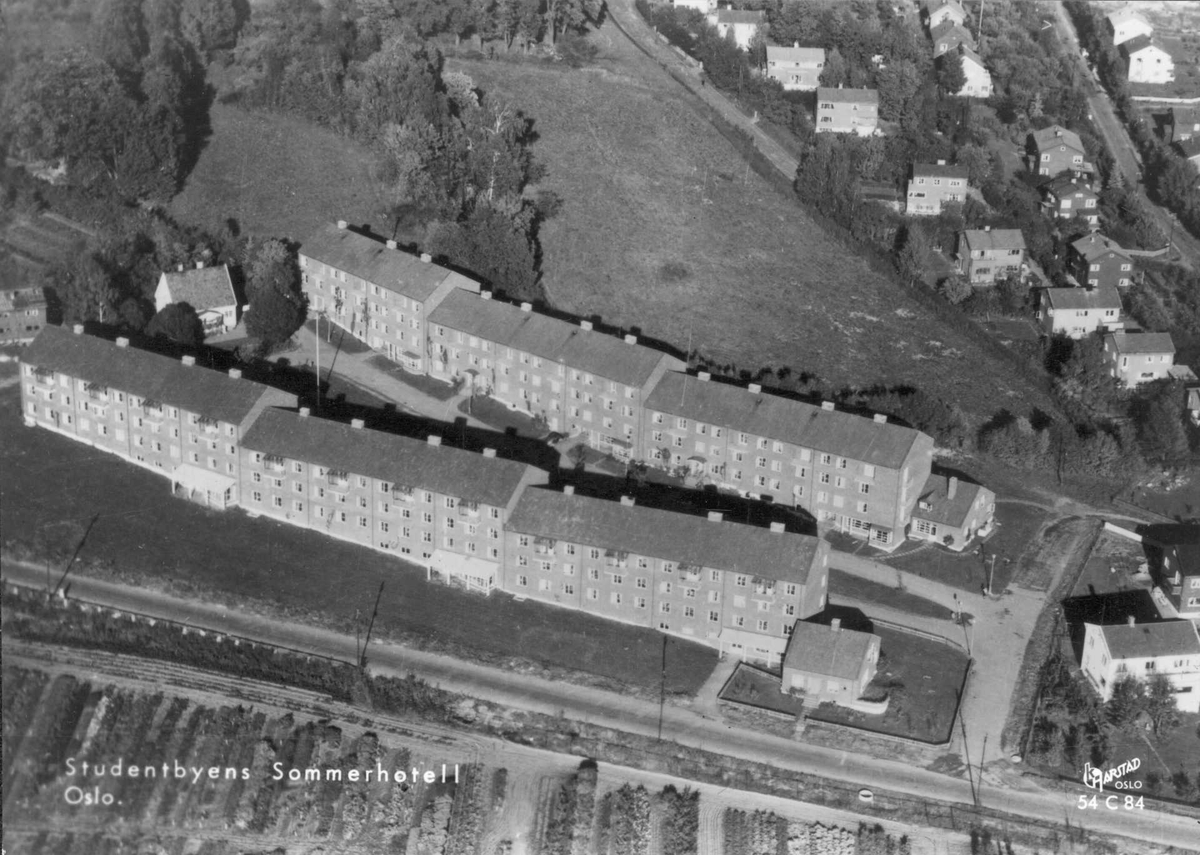
"Studentbyens Sommerhotell" (Summer Hotel) 1955.

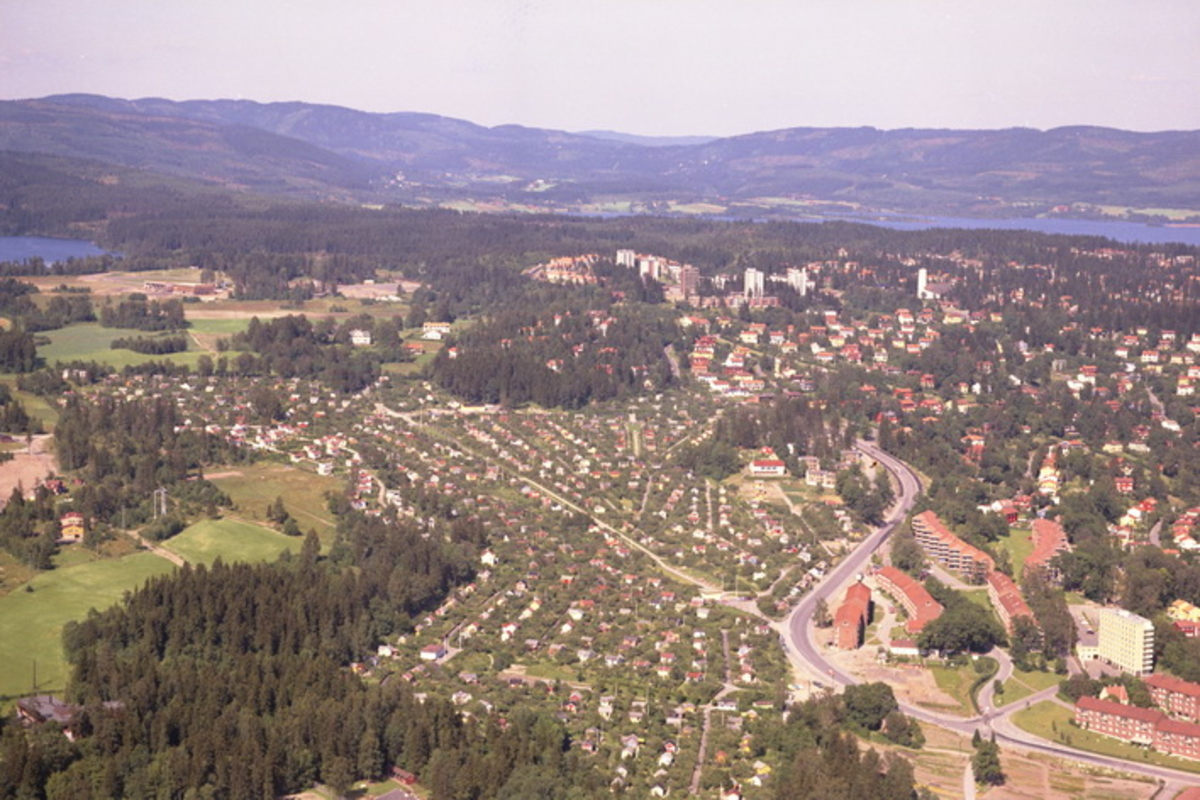
Sogn Studentby 1964, before last stage of "old" village.

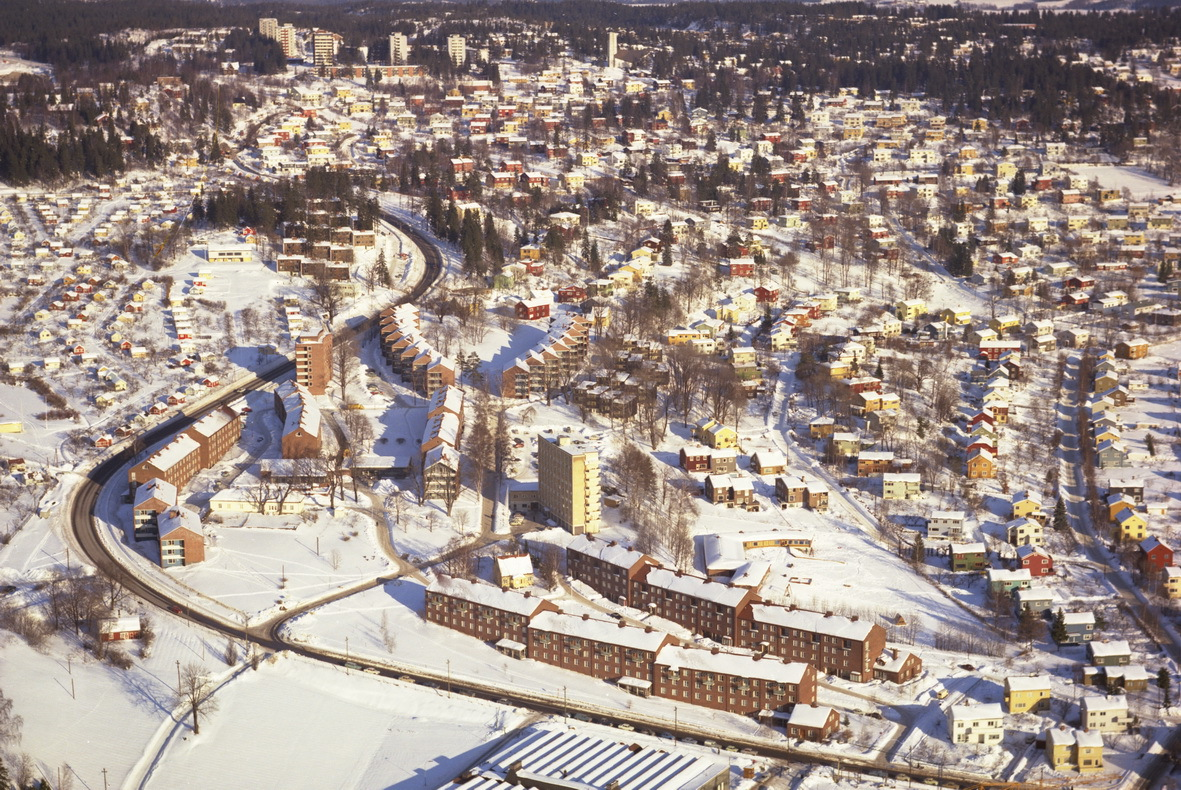
Sogn Studentby 1967, after last stage of "old" village.

The "new" village
September 2012 marked the opening of the first stage of the "new" student village. The last stage of the "new" village, the completely renovated "Tårnbygget"/"Høyblokken", although originally completed with 112 flats in October 1962, hosts 148 flats, of which 73 in a new annex, is completed in 2014 for a total of 306 new flats in the village + the 75 renovated flats in "Tårnbygget"/"Høyblokken".

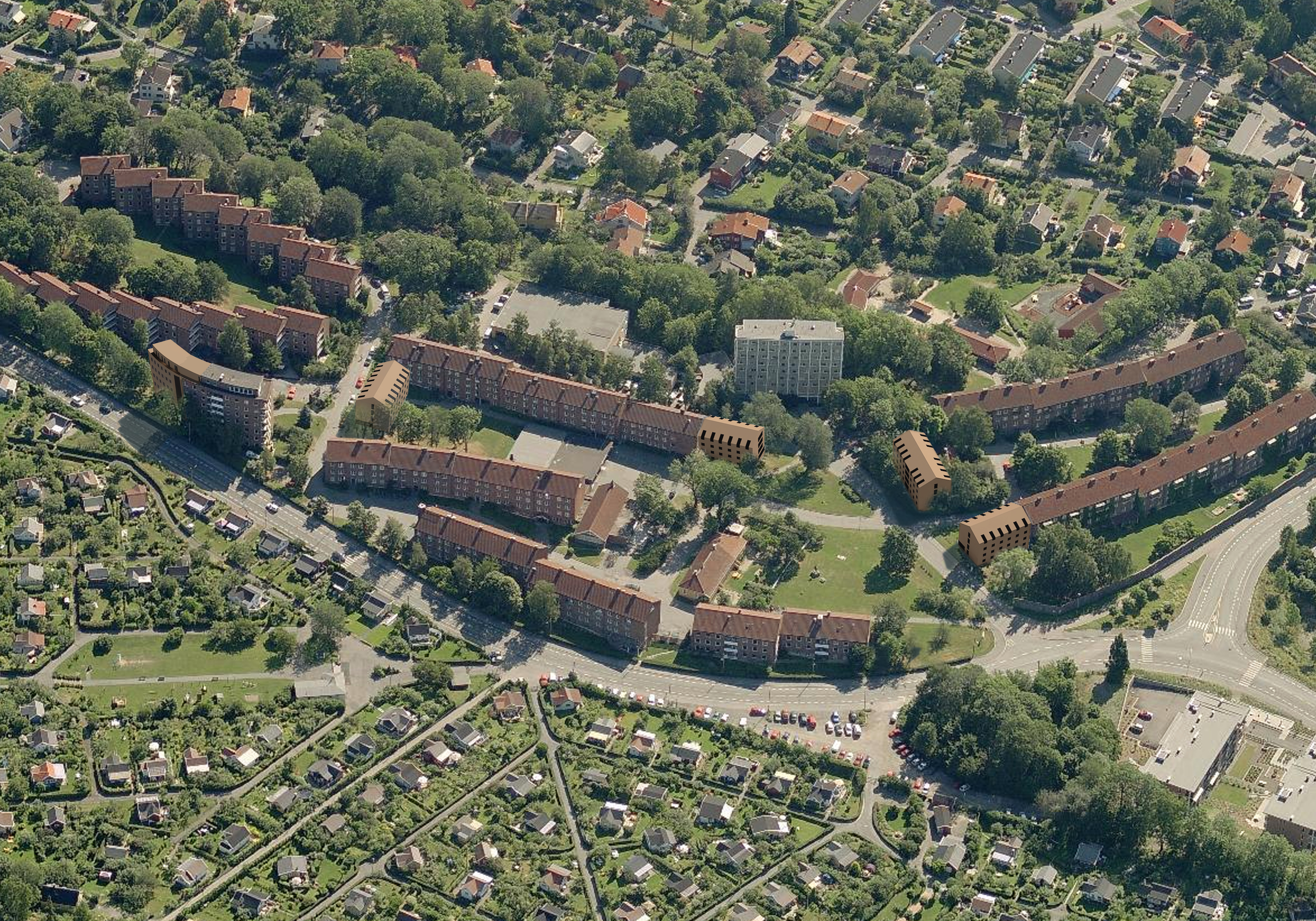
Illustration of new and old buildings at Sogn Studentby.

== Student culture ==
Aasmund Olavsson Vinje
In the 150th anniversary year of Vinje's birth the city council erected a statue in 1968, at last. Since 1954 there had been local plans for a plaza with modern sculptures by young artists, envisioned by Stenersen. Some had early on voiced concern about obscene sculptures. The professor Sigmund Skard characterized Vinje as sort of a Hippie from Telemark, as mayor Brynjulf Bull unveiled him. Vinje is among other things known for his poetry.

Vinje, Aasmund (1860). Blaamann (in Norwegian) – via Wikisource. Known as "Blåmann, Blåmann bukken min" set to melody composed by Anne Haavie ca. 1870.
Vinje, Aasmund (1866). Den dag kjem aldri (in Norwegian) – via Wikisource. Den dag kjem aldri was famously performed by Tobben & Ero in 1972.

Edvard Munch
500 Original works by Edvard Munch hung on the walls both in the restaurant and in other buildings of the village. They were part of Rolf Stenersen's gift to Aker municipality in 1936, he decided some time between 1946 and 1966, being in the building committee, be hung on the walls in Sogn Studentby. 950 works of artists like Ludvig Karsten, Bernt Julius Muus Clüver, Erik Harry Johannessen, Rolf Nesch, Jakob Weidemann, and Sigurd Winge. Some of the works where stolen or vandalised, and in 1973 removed. In 1994 Stenersen Museum opened, and made the art public again. Since 2008, there has been a debate on the subject of merging Munch Museum and Stenersen Museum for Lambda in Bjørvika.

50s & 60s
Since the 50s SIO operated a restaurant/pub in the building that would later become "Amatøren".

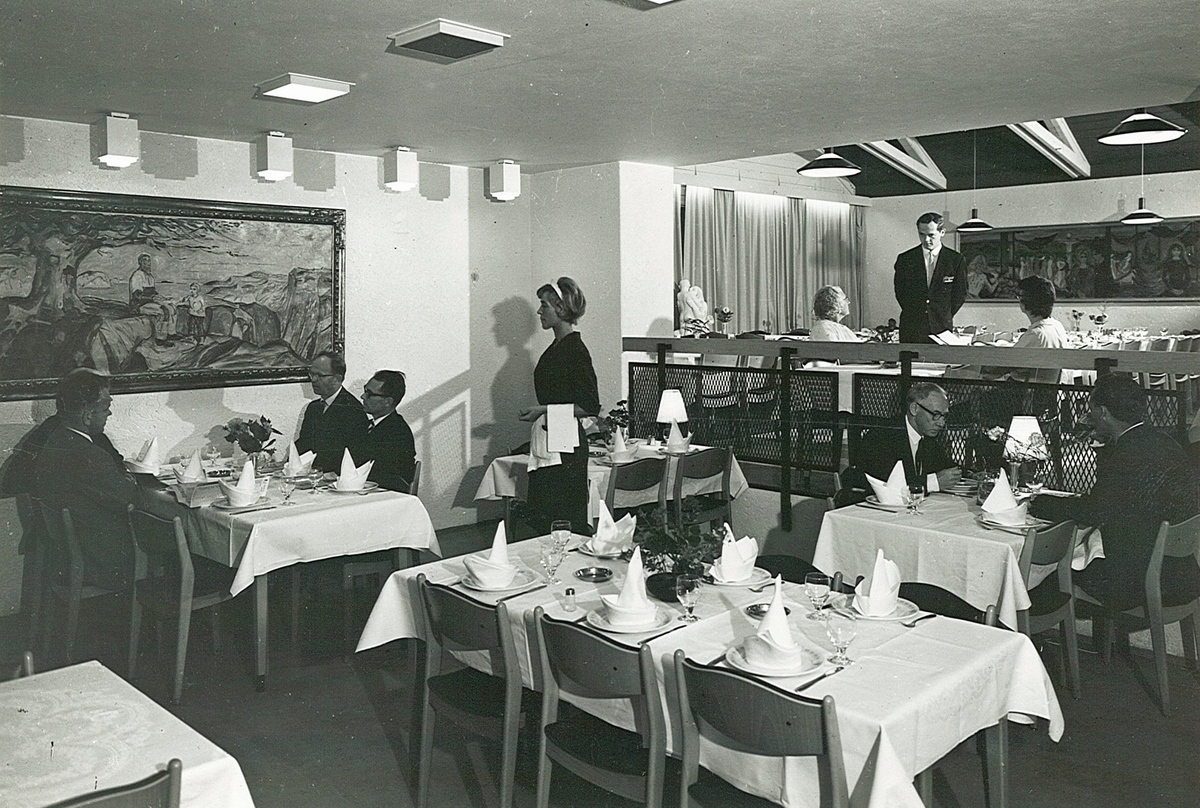
The restaurant at Sogn studentby with Munch originals. ca. 1955–1960

67–78
Due to a lack of jazz clubs in Oslo from 1967 to 1978, students operated Sogn Jazzklubb here. Karin Krog performed at the opening night. The first major booking in 1967 was Don Cherry with Jan Garbarek, and the last concert organized by Sogn Jazzklubb was Radka Toneff in 1978. Before building a reputation they gained cred through Randi Hultin. Steinar Kristiansen was primus motor and organizer for a decade. Espen Rud, Terje Bjørklund, and Arild Andersen were members of a rolling house band. They played with Niels-Henning Ørsted Pedersen and Kenny Drew, among others. George Russel was an important character here. Karin Krog, Svein Finnerud.

94–98
In 1994 the restaurant was closed, and a student group led by members of committee:Leieboerutvalget worked towards overtaking SIO and running the place themselves. Deputy of the committee Peter Lenda managed together with 13 friends at Sogn to form a committee in 1997, and then together with SiO administration, they managed to renovate/rebuild the restaurant with NOK 2.5 million. Initially, they had worked towards using one of the other buildings at Sogn Studentby. They failed in asking money from Norwegian businesses with a folder sent out to 400, but got some money from Solofondet, and SiO gave money to interior. The initial board had eight members (chair, deputee, event executive, interior executive, tech executive, PR executive, activity executive, and economics executive). Some time later the volunteer executive was also made a member of the board. They aimed at making the house available to different kinds of activities. Students could rent a room for band rehearsals, and they had a stage. Doors opened January 1998 at "Amatøren", named after Lars Saabye Christensen's debut novel with the same name, about a student living in Sogn Studentby.

98–08
Lars Saabye Christensen read from his book on the opening night January 28, 1998.

- Bands who played were Big Bang, Number Seven Deli, Lyd, and Thulsa Doom.
- Rock am Sogn may have been the biggest event at Sogn. It was a festival in the years 2002-2005 and 2007–2010.
- Oslo Prog was a festival held here initially in 2002-2004 and 2005, courtesy of Trond Gjellum. Bands like Richard Sinclair and Panzerpappa played.
- Also a local band festival to promote the bands rehearsing
- Political debates
- Amateur theatre

== Demographics ==
In 2007, more than one-third of the students living at Sogn are from abroad.

== See also ==
- List of Olympic Villages
