= Holmenkolbanen =

Norwegian transport company

A/S Holmenkolbanen
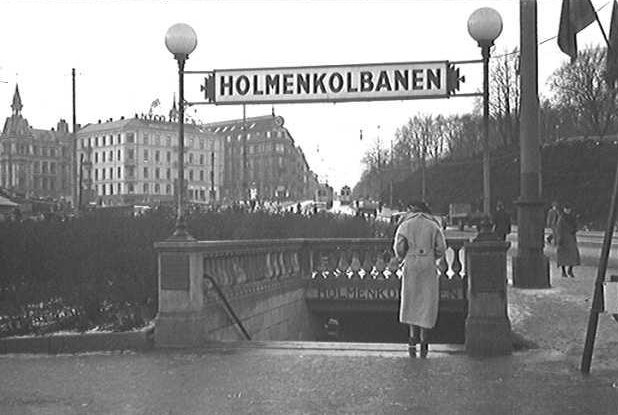
- Sign over stairs to the Nationaltheatret Station (1936)
- Industry: Transport
- Founded: 17 February 1896
- Headquarters: Oslo, Norway
- Parent: Oslo Sporveier

A/S Holmenkolbanen was a company that owned and operated part of the Oslo Tramway and Oslo Metro in Norway from 1898 until 1975 when services were taken over by the majority owner Oslo Sporveier. Holmenkolbanen opened the Holmenkoll Line in 1898, and expanded it to become the first Nordic underground railway in 1928. The company took over operations of the Smestad Line in 1933, the Sognsvann Line in 1934. The company was merged into Oslo Sporveier in 1992.

== History ==
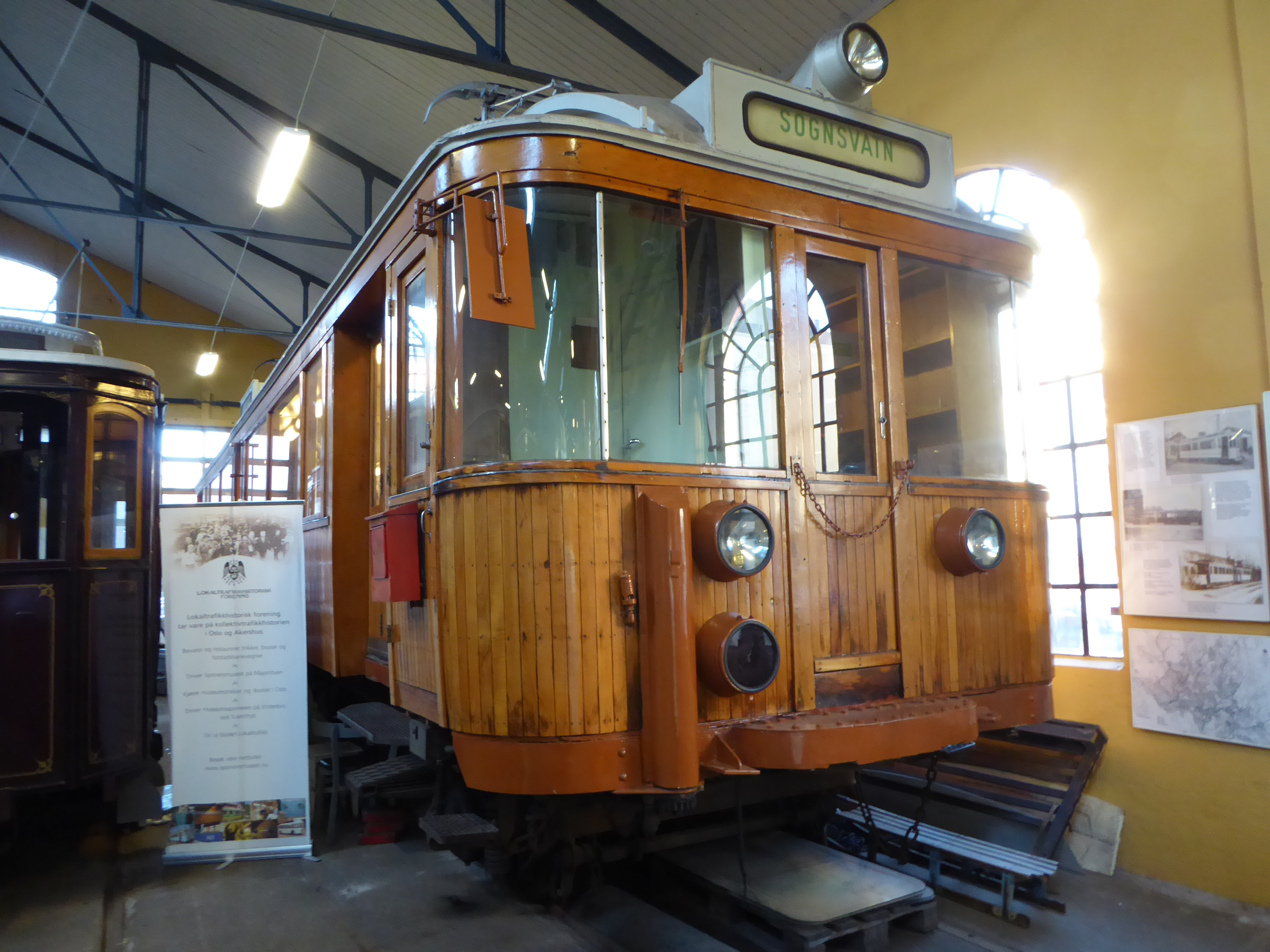
The electric motor coach HKB 110 of Holmenkollbanen from 1930 at Sporveismuseet in Oslo.

The company was founded on 17 February 1896 by H. M. Heyerdahl and Albert Fenger Krog as the leading executives. The goal was to build a suburban tramway—the Holmenkoll Line—from the Holmenkollen neighborhood in northwestern Oslo to the end of the street tramway at Majorstuen. The line opened first to Besserud (at the time called Holmenkolen) on 31 May 1898 and then to Frognerseteren on 15 May 1916. The second part of the line was constructed by its subsidiary A/S Tryvandsbanen, and included a single track cargo line to Tryvandshøiden. It was established on 4 January 1912 and disestablished on 1 January 1920.

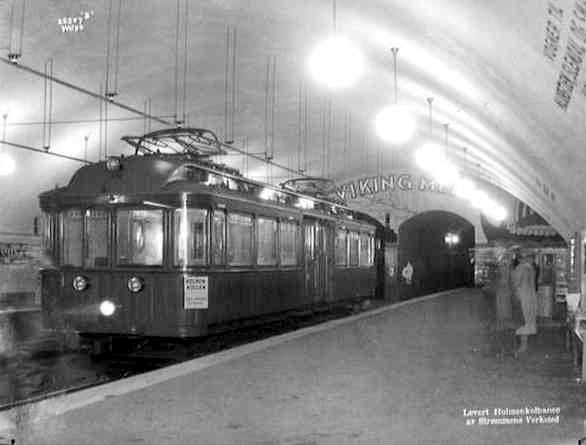
Holmenkolbane suburban tram car at Nationaltheatret station in 1928

To offer direct services into the city center, the company started the construction Common Tunnel (Fellestunnelen) to the underground Nationaltheatret Station. Construction started in 1912, but had to stop in October 1914 after about thirty properties had received massive damage from the construction; some even had to be razed. A settlement was not reached until 1925, and construction started again in 1926, with the line opening on 28 June 1928. However, the real estate owners were not satisfied with the settlement and it ended in court, with the property owners gaining additional claims.

The cost of the tunnel was too high for the company to bear, and by 1932 it could not handle its interest. To save the company, the municipal owned Akersbanerne agreed to a merger between A/S Holmenkolbanen and two of Akersbanerne's three lines—the Smestad Line and the under construction Sognsvann Line that would both share the tunnel into the center, with the transaction taking place on 16 November 1933.

In 1942 the Kolsås Line was rebuilt to terminate through the Smestad Line, and in 1944 the owner Bærumsbanen was bought by Oslo Sporveier. After the municipal merger between Aker and Oslo on 1 January 1948, the two municipal tram companies Akersbanerne and Oslo Sporveier merged; due to this the operation of all the four western lines were collected in A/S Holmenkolbanen. Operation was transferred to Oslo Sporveier on 1 August 1975, after it had bought almost all the shares in the company, and it had been delisted from the Oslo Stock Exchange. A/S Holmenkolbanen remained a separate company until 6 May 1992, when it was fully merged with Oslo Sporveier.

== Historic gallery ==
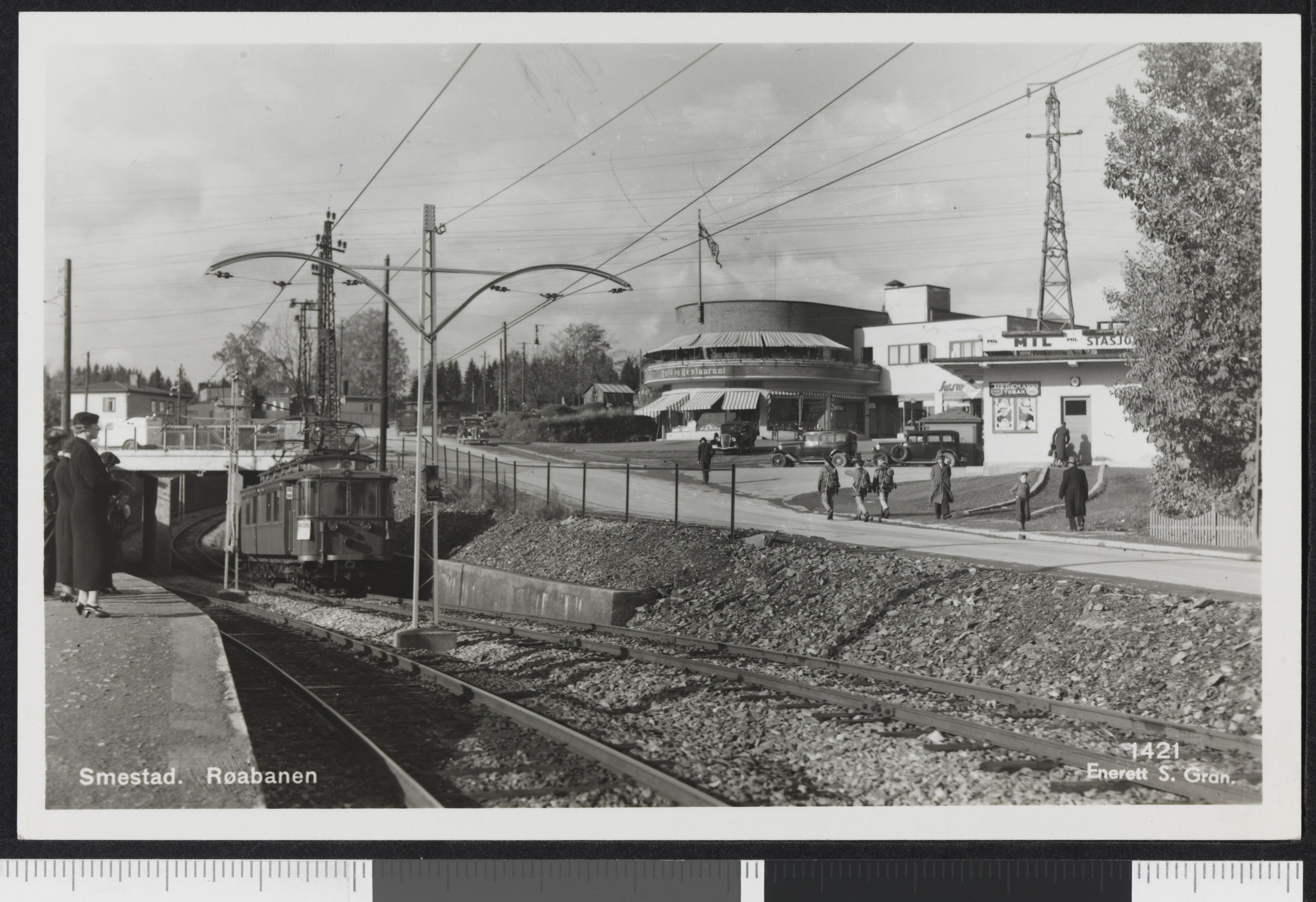
Motorcar leaves Smestad Station (postcard from 1930s)

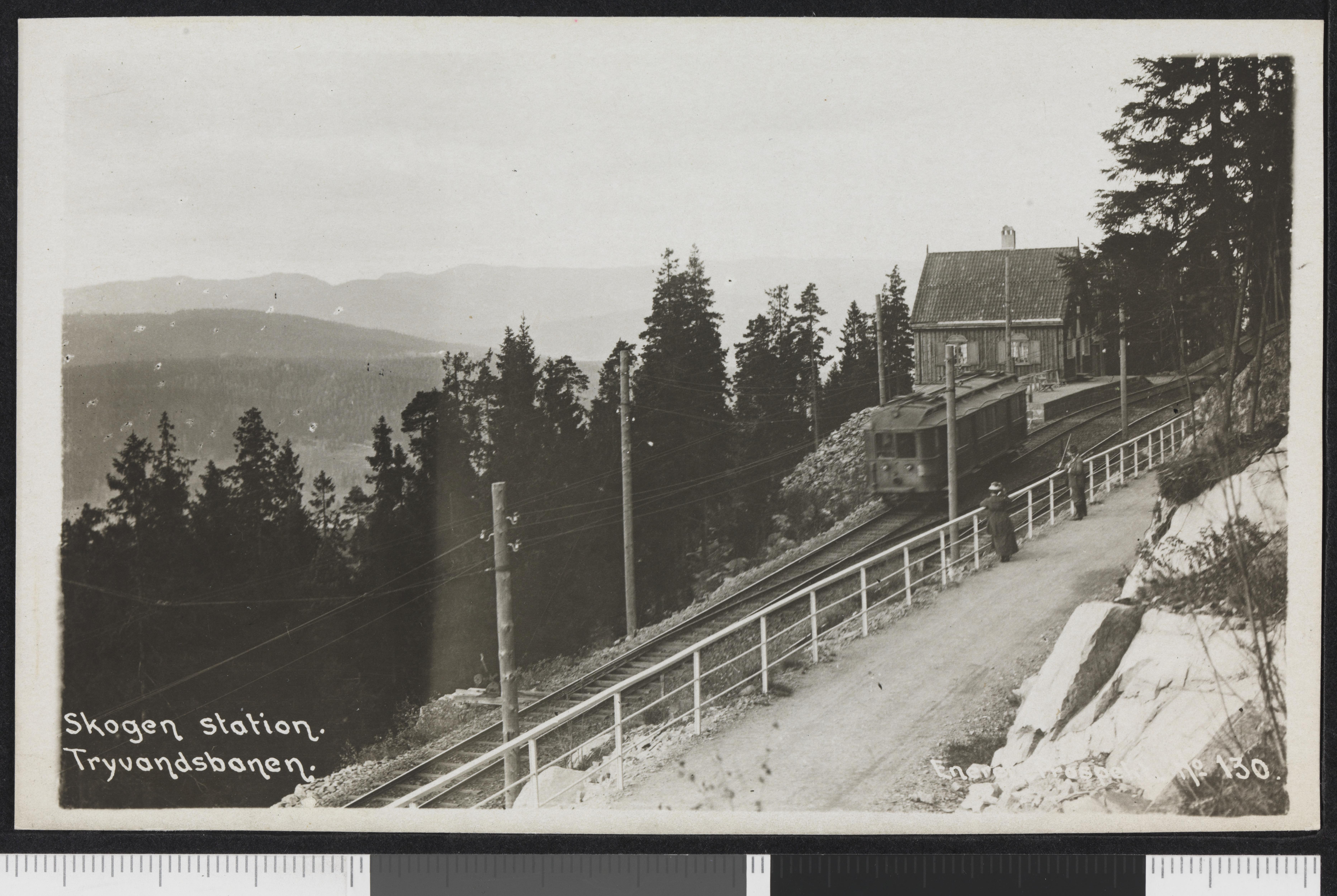
Motorcar leaves the then Skogen Station (from between 1916 and 1923)

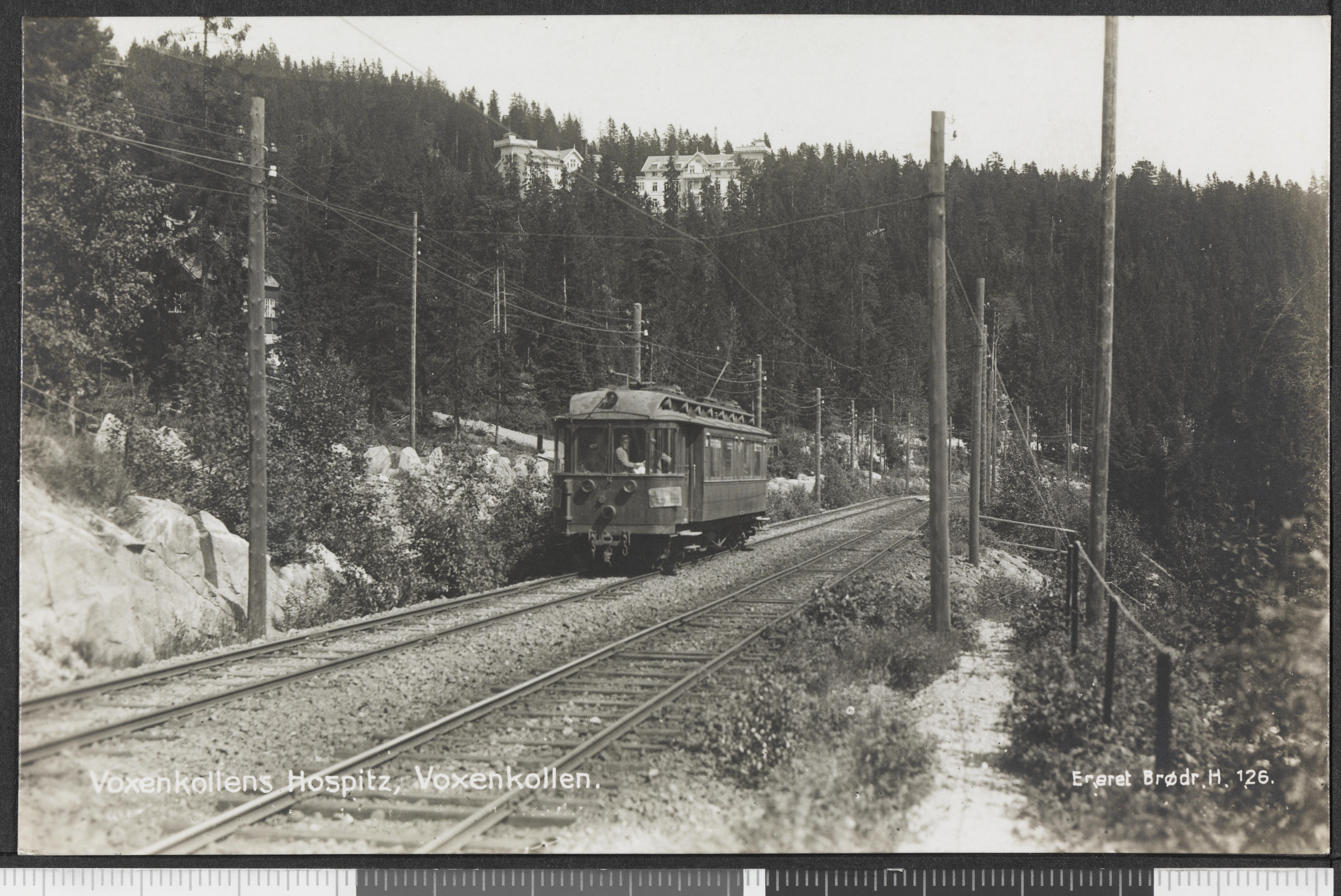
Motorcar on the way up at Voksenkollen. Unknown date.

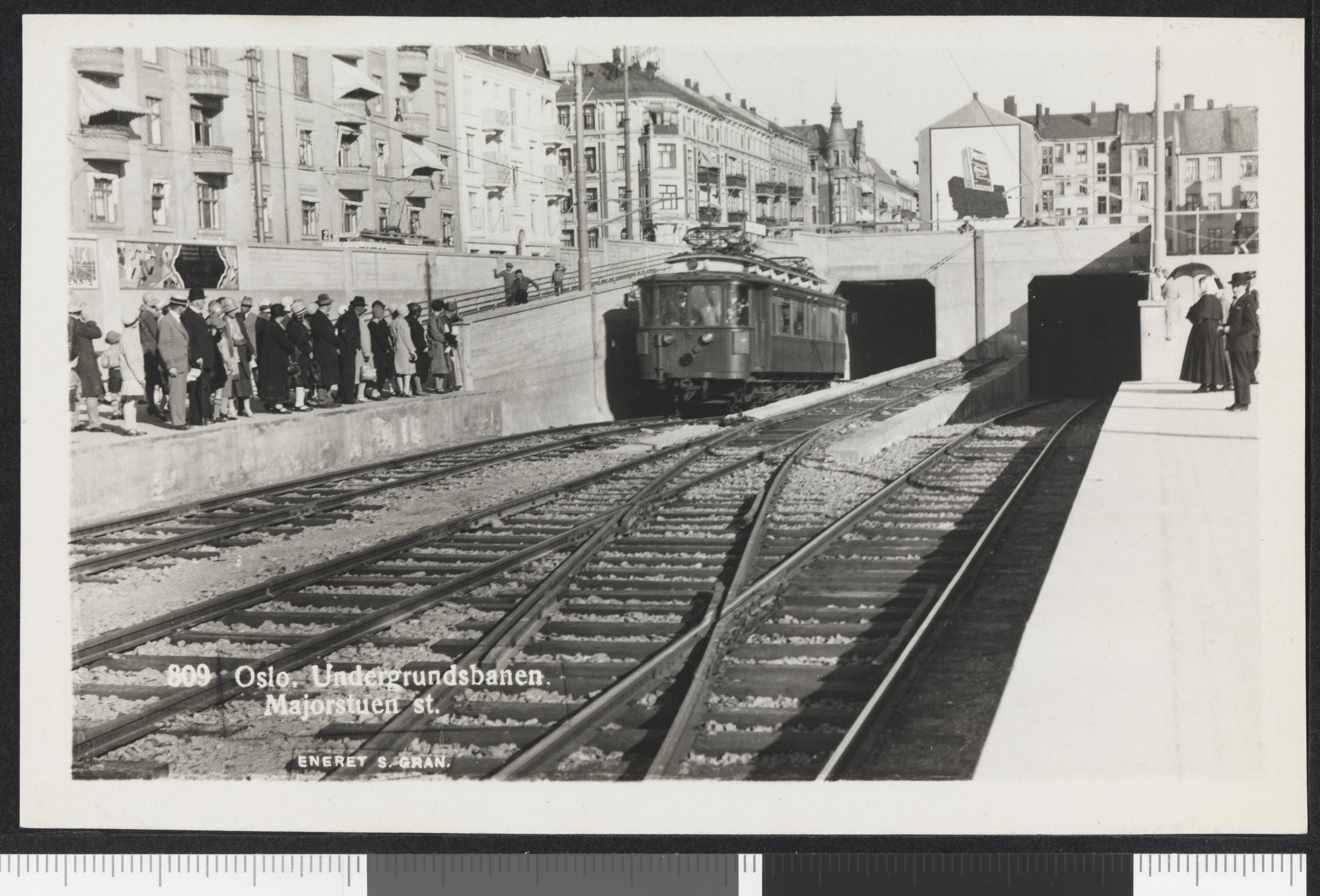
Majorstuen Station in 1928 or 1929

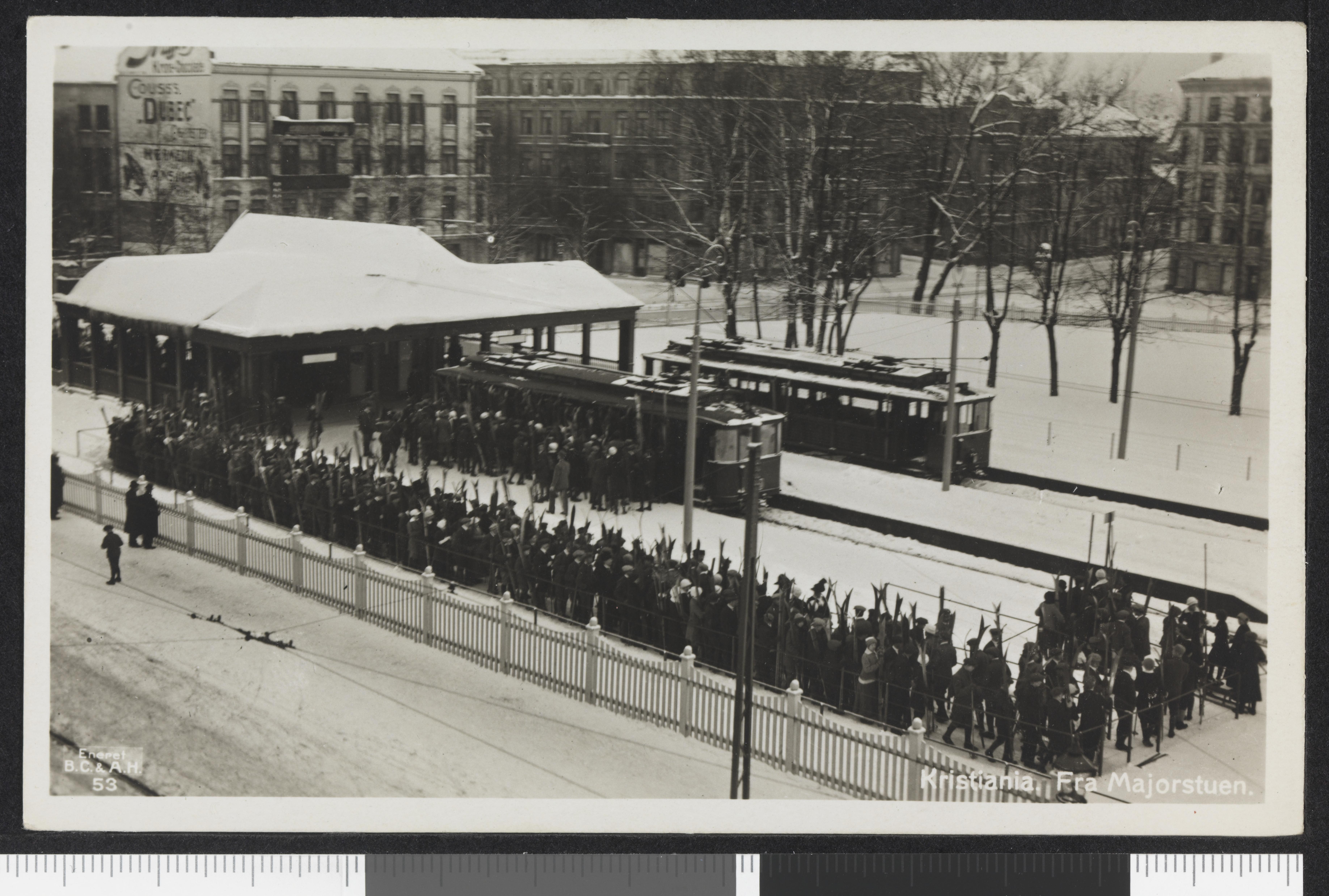
Majorstuen Station. Unknown date.

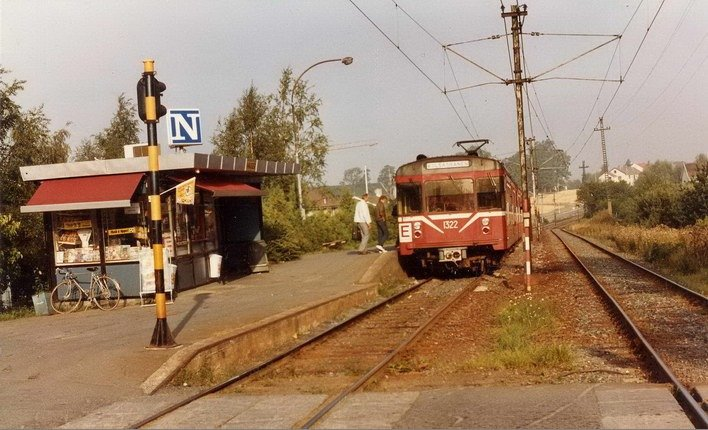
Hauger Station in 1982

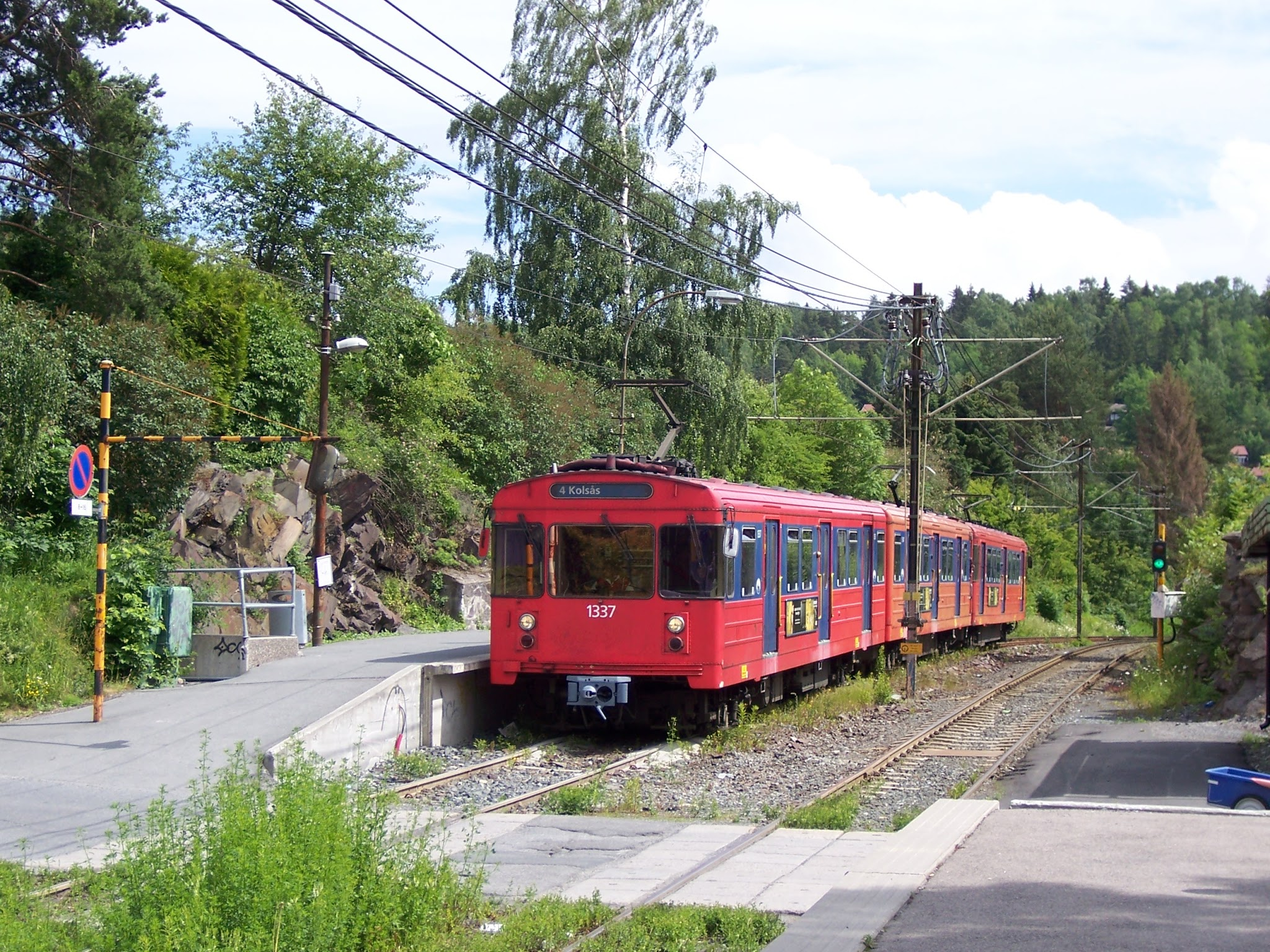
Hauger Station in 2006
