= Tryvandsbanen =

Norwegian railway company

A/S Tryvandsbanen
- Company type: Private
- Industry: Transport
- Founded: 4 January 1912
- Defunct: 1 January 1920
- Fate: acquisited by Holmenkolbanen
- Headquarters: Aker, Norway
- Key people: Harald Boe
- Products: Infrastructure

A/S Tryvandsbanen was a Norwegian company that constructed a rail extension nicknamed Tryvandsbanen ("Tryvann Line") of the Holmenkoll Line from Besserud (then Holmenkollen) to Tryvandshøiden station. The company was established 4 January 1912 and opened the Tryvann Line 15 May 1916. Tryvandsbanen was disestablished on 1 January 1920.
