= Tryvann =

Lake in Oslo, Norway

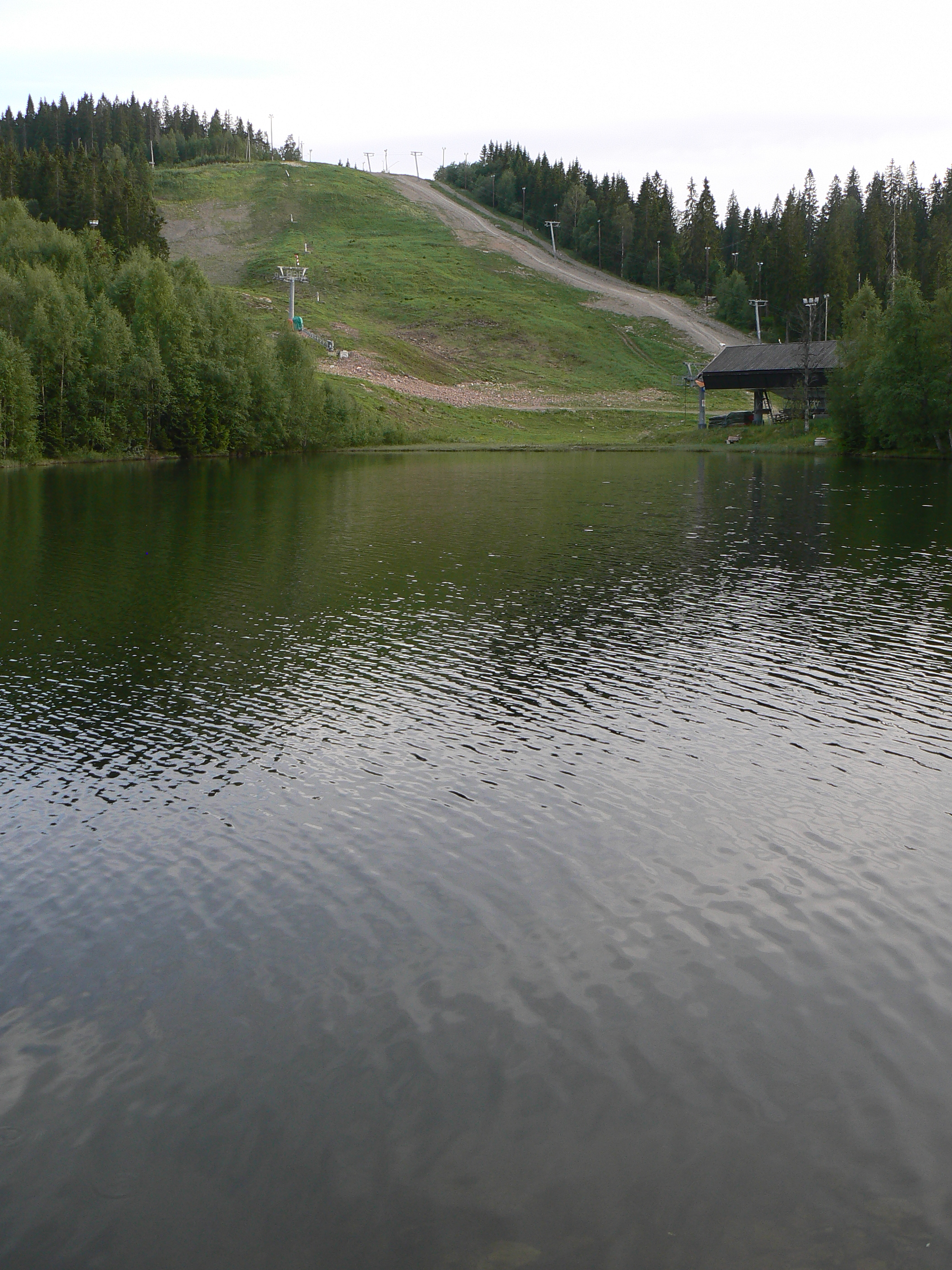

- Location within Norway
- Location: Nordmarka
- Coordinates: 59°59′50″N 10°40′8″E
- Basin countries: Norway
- Surface elevation: 396 m (1,299 ft)

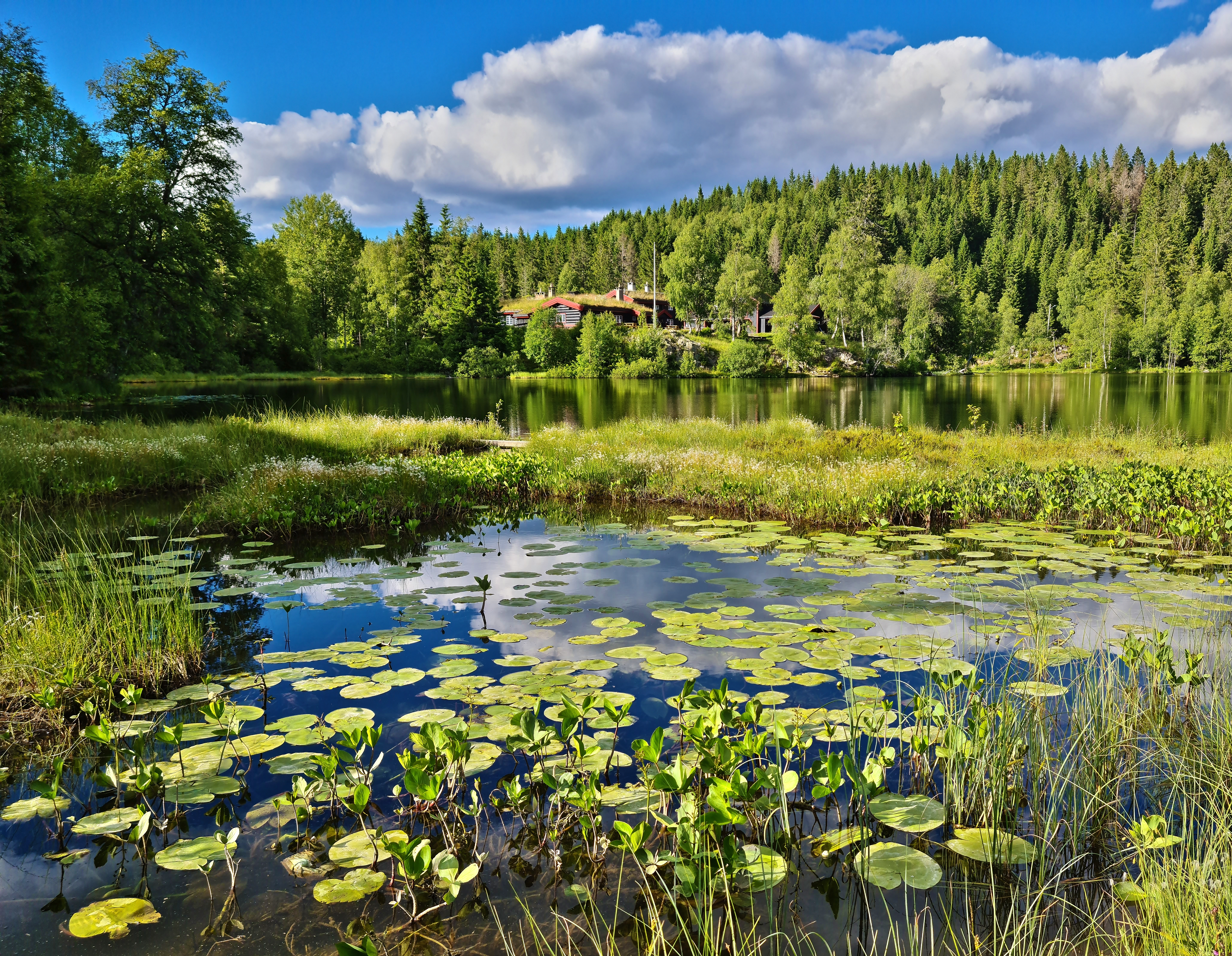
Store Tryvannet and Tryvannstua

Tryvann is a small lake in Nordmarka, the forest area just north of Oslo city, near the Holmenkollen ski jump. By the water lies a cabin called Tryvannstua, in which there is a café open regularly during both summer and winter. On a hill above the lake looms the television tower Tryvannstårnet ("The Tryvann tower"), visible from most of Oslo. Tryvann is the entry and beginning of Nordmarka. It is used all year around. The key purposes of this area in the winter are skiing and cross-country skiing, whereas in the summer it is more commonly used for walks in the forest and biking. When referring to Tryvann, it is mostly referred to as the Tryvann vinterpark.

== Facts and infrastructure ==
Tryvann vinterpark is an alpine ski resort in the area around Tryvann. The first ski slope of Tryvann vinterpark, named "Tryvannskleiva", was created in 1931. Since then an enormous expansion has occurred, and today Tryvann vinterpark consists of 18 slopes and 11 lifts. The longest run (Wyllerløypa) is 1,400 metres, with a drop of 381 metres. All the slopes have floodlighting which covers over 9.6 km of terrain. The resort has a fairly large terrain park featuring edge rails, boxes, jib features and a full-scale halfpipe, regularly hosting some minor national skiing and snowboarding competitions.

Tryvann vinterpark is easily accessed by visitors with the metro system. The ride from Oslo city centre to the top of Tryvann takes approximately 25 minutes. This gives easy access and opportunities for over one million citizens in Oslo. Tryvann is Norway's fourth biggest ski resort, measured in ticket sales. In 2012 there were 205,000 visitors.

== History of Tryvannstua ==
Tryvanstua was built in 1931. The cabin is constructed of windfall timber and was constructed unexpectedly after an immense storm in Nordmarka that occurred in November 1930. The storm damaged a radius close to 7000 m^{3}, bringing down 3000 trees. As a result, Tryvannstua was constructed with the purpose of serving food for people travelling in the woods, and that was the beginning of Tryvann vinterpark. Tryvannstua was renovated and expanded in 1965–66. This increased the seating capacity to 175 people, and a fireplace was built for freezing alpinists. The renovation was an initiative mainly because of skiing in the 1966 World Cup.
