= Foundation for Student Life in Oslo and Akershus =

Logo.

The Foundation for Student Life in Oslo and Akershus (Norwegian: Studentsamskipnaden i Oslo og Akershus, SiO) is a student welfare organisation in Oslo, Norway. It was known as the Foundation for Student Life in Oslo until January 2011, when it expanded into Akershus.

It was established in 1939 as the first of its kind in Norway. It among others serves students of the University of Oslo, the Oslo School of Architecture and Design, the MF Norwegian School of Theology, the Norwegian School of Sport Sciences, the Norwegian School of Veterinary Science, the Norwegian Academy of Music, BI Norwegian Business School and the Oslo National Academy of the Arts.
