= Tryvann stadion =

Former speed skating rink in Oslo, Norway

Coordinates: 59.9870°N 10.6669°E

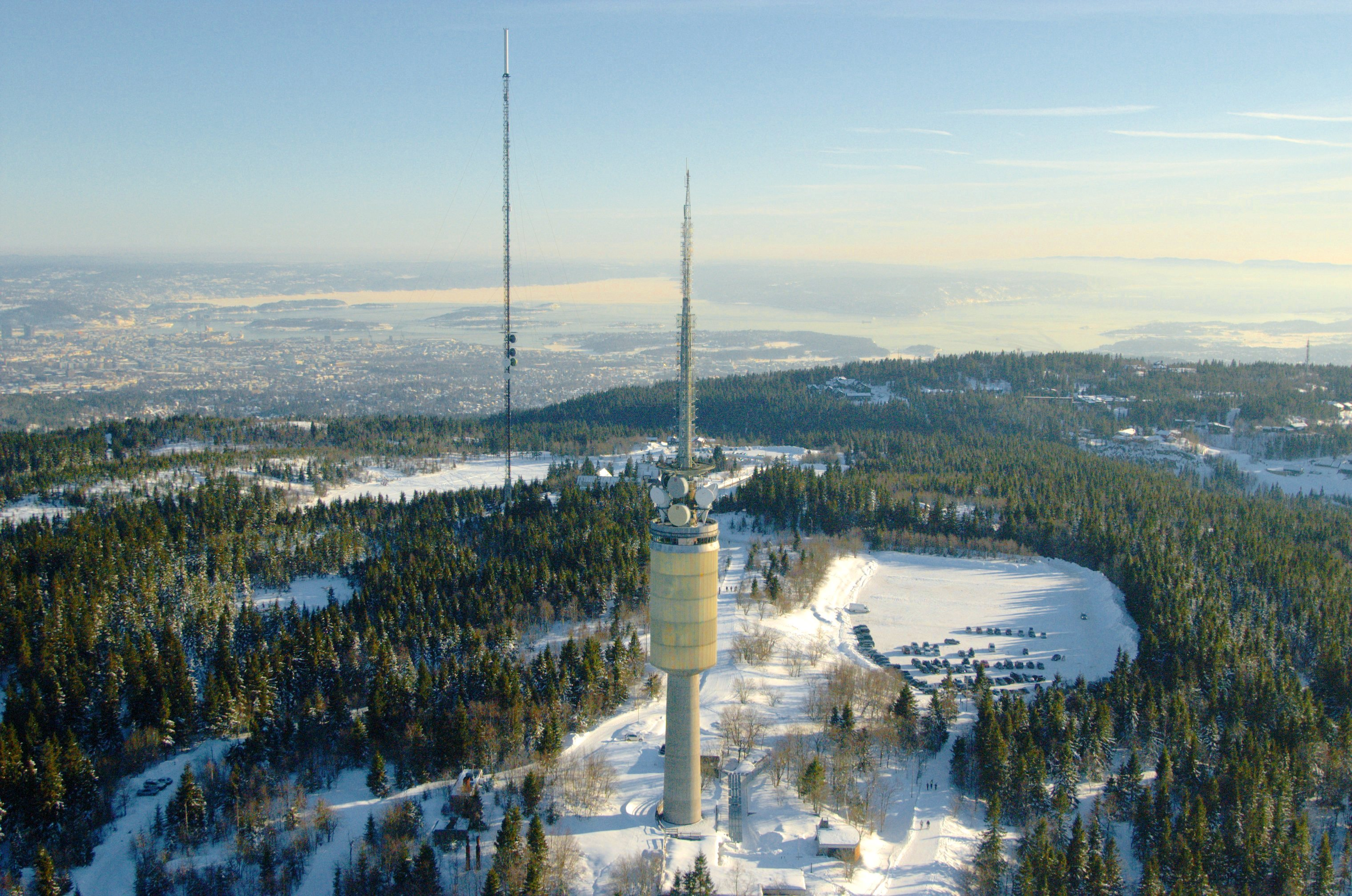
- 2006 image of Tryvannshøyden; the location of the stadium can be seen to the right in the image, where the cars are parked.
- Interactive map of Tryvann stadion
- Location: Tryvannshøyden, Oslo, Norway
- Owner: Oslo Municipality
- Surface: Ice

Construction
- Groundbreaking: 1933
- Opened: 1933
- Closed: 1970s

Tryvann stadion was a speed skating rink located at Tryvannshøyden in Oslo, Norway.

Traditionally the main speed skating venues in Oslo was Frogner stadion and Bislett stadion. In 1933, the city council decided to build a skating rink at Tryvann to allow for a longer season. Unlike the city-center venues which were just above mean sea level, Tryvann stadion was located at 517 meters (1,696 ft) above mean sea level. This allowed the skating season to last from 1 November to 1 April. Transport was available via the Holmenkollen Line. During the 1952 Winter Olympics, the venue was designated as a reserve venue for Bislett, but never used. During the 1970s, the venue was demolished to make room for parking.
