= Tryvannstårnet =

Broadcasting tower near Oslo, Norway

Coordinates: 59°59′18″N 10°40′04″E

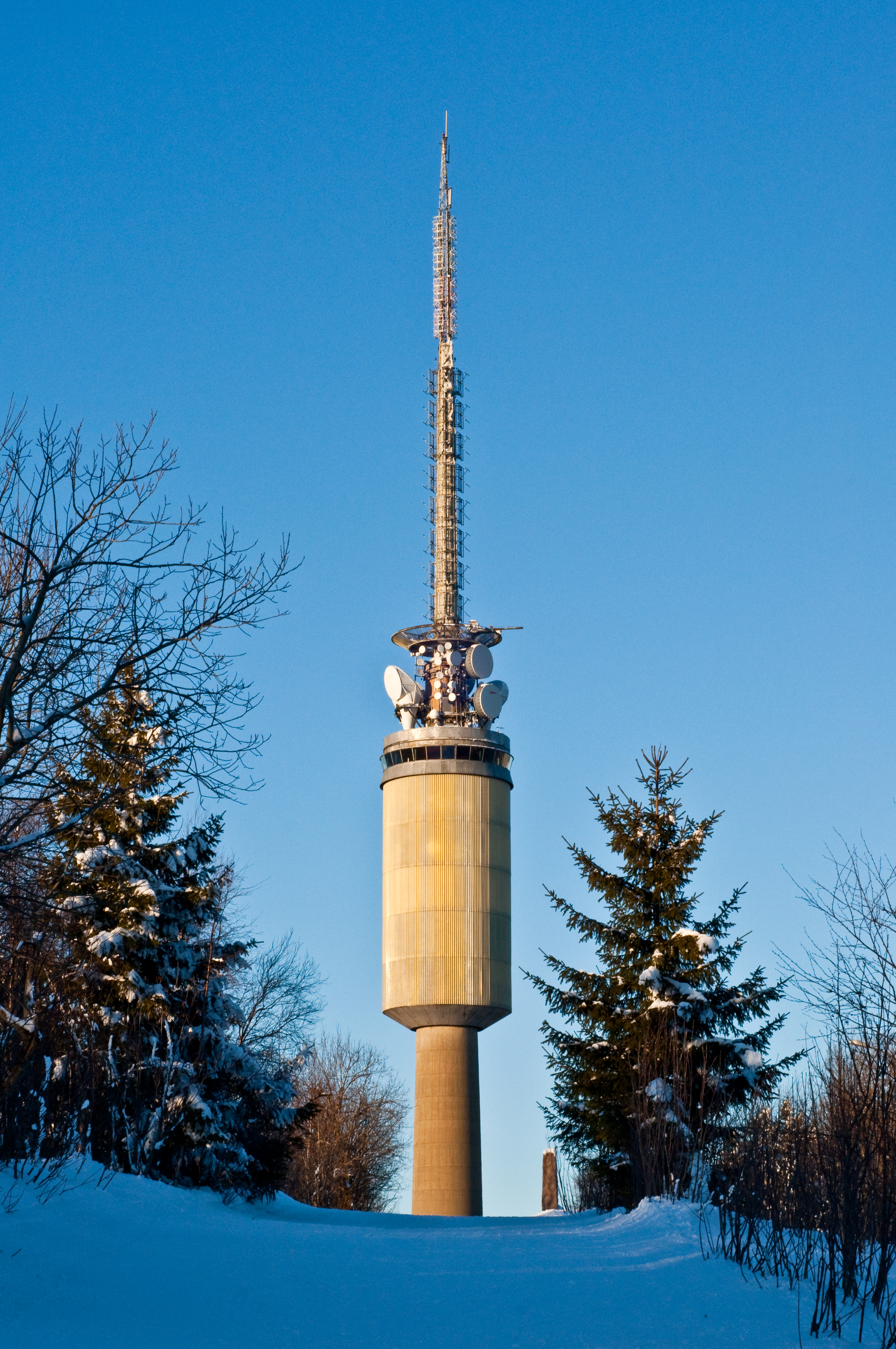
Tryvannstårnet, 2 February 2010

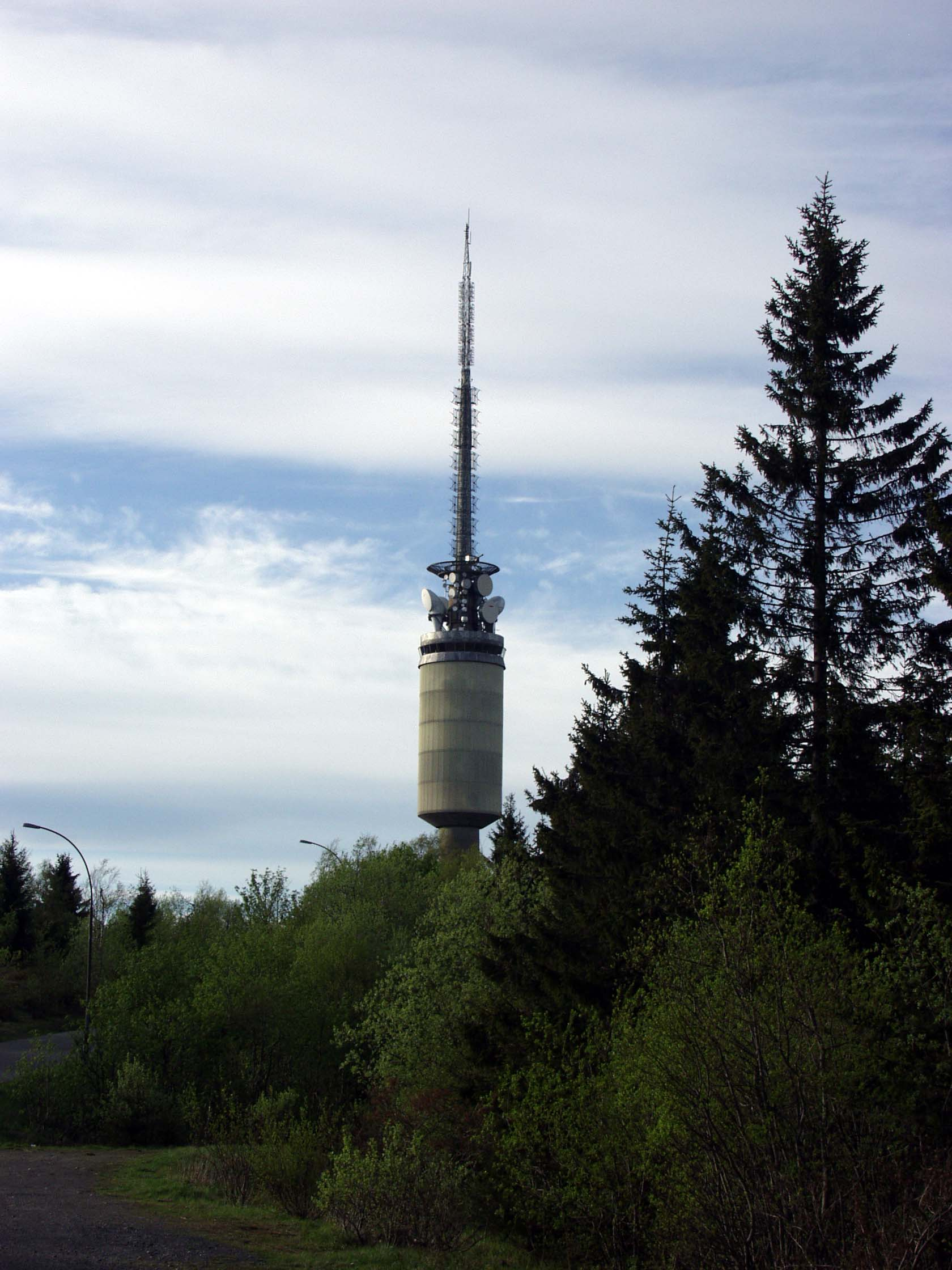
Tryvannstårnet

Tryvannstårnet (the Tryvann tower) is an 118-metre (387 feet) tall broadcasting tower near Oslo, located 529 metres (1,736 feet) above mean sea level on the summit of Tryvannshøyden hill overlooking lake Tryvann.

Tryvannstårnet was built in 1962 and has an observation deck at a height of 60 metres (197 feet), from which, weather conditions permitting, the view extends to the border with Sweden and Gaustatoppen mountain. The observation deck was closed in 2005 because of new fire safety regulations which would have required expensive modifications which coincided with rapidly declining visitor numbers. In the 1980s and 1990s annual visitor numbers averaged 100,000, but in the last year it was open to the public, only 25,000.

There is a large underground shelter beneath Tryvannstårnet.

The tower became redundant in 2018 when TV and radio broadcasting went digital, and the City of Oslo attempted to sell it, but without success. It was put on the market again in 2024, valued at somewhere between NOK14 million and NOK42 million, and on 21 January 2025 it was announced that Oslo property developer Christian Ringnes had bought the tower and the surrounding three acres of forest for NOK14 million ($1.25 million). He intends to renovate the building and reopen it as a café and restaurant complex.
