= Tryvannshøyden =

Hill in Oslo, Norway

Coordinates: 59°59′20″N 10°40′05″E

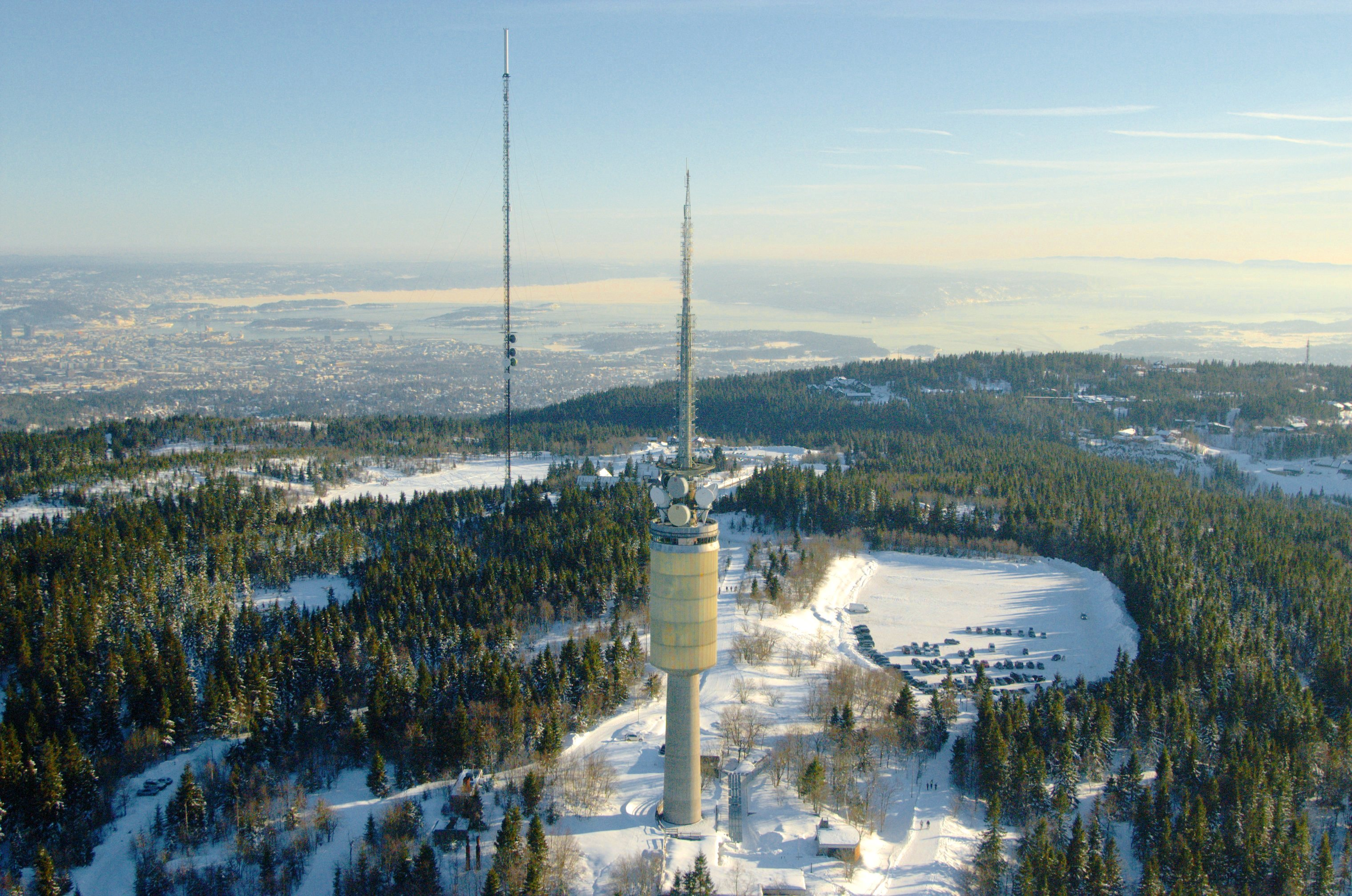
Tryvannshøyden

Tryvannshøyden or Tryvannshøgda (formerly Tryvasshøgda) is a hill in Oslo, Norway, peaking 530 metres above mean sea level. It is named after the nearby lake Tryvann. It is known as a transmitter site consisting of Tryvannstårnet and a guyed TV mast. The hill featured a speed skating venue, Tryvann stadion, from 1934 to 1966.
