= Frognerseteren =

Neighborhood of Oslo, Norway

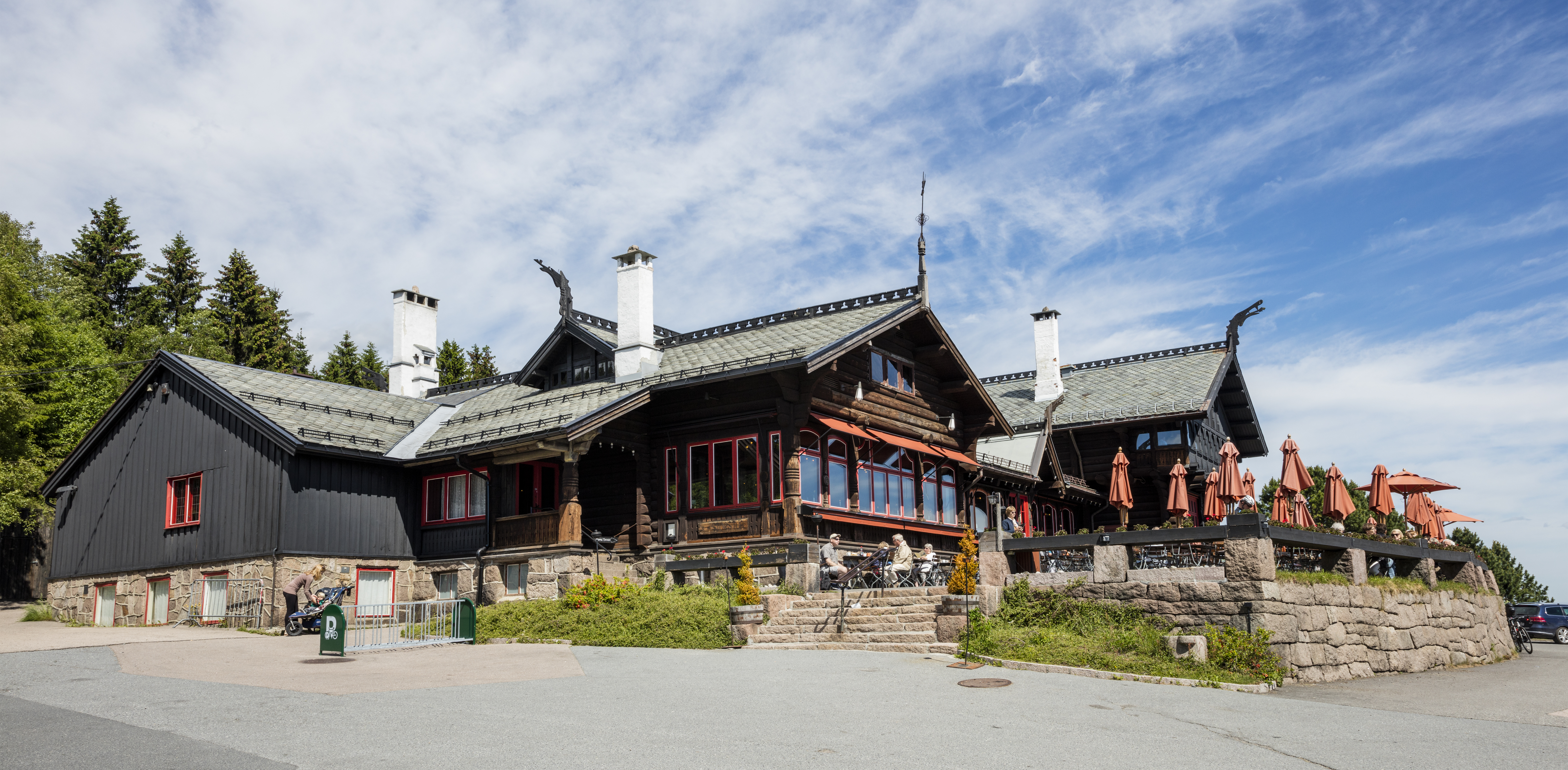
The restaurant

Frognerseteren is a neighborhood of Oslo, Norway, located within Nordmarka. It is a popular starting point for recreational hiking and skiing in Oslo. Frognerseteren Station is the terminal station of the Holmenkollen Line of the Oslo Metro. Frognerseteren Restaurant (59°58′39″N 10°40′39″E) and conference facilities is one of the best examples of architectural style Dragestil in Oslo.

Frognerseteren means the seter ("mountain dairy farm", roughly comparable to shieling) of Frogner (Manor). Frognerseteren with parts of the Nordmarka forest (Frognerseterskogen) was part of Frogner Manor until 1848, when the owner Jacob Benjamin Wegner sold the rest of the estate but kept Frognerseteren. Wegner's heirs sold Frognerseteren to Thomas Johannessen Heftye in 1864, and Heftye's heirs sold Frognerseteren to Christiania municipality in 1889.

The restaurant menu is based on traditional Norwegian cuisine.
