= Deaths in January 1995 =

The following is a list of notable deaths in January 1995.

Entries for each day are listed alphabetically by surname. A typical entry lists information in the following sequence:

- Name, age, country of citizenship at birth, subsequent country of citizenship (if applicable), reason for notability, cause of death (if known), and reference.

== January 1995 ==
=== 1 ===
- Wilhelm Altar, 94, Austrian theoretical physicist and magneto ionic theory pioneer.
- Jack Birney, 66, Australian politician.
- Bill Bryant, 88, Australian cricketer.
- Warren Caro, 87, American theater executive.
- Ted Hawkins, 58, American singer-songwriter.
- Nina Leen, 90, Russian-born American photographer for Life.
- J. Miller Leavy, 89, American prosecuting lawyer.
- Ralph W. Nicholson, 78, American civil servant, military officer, and business executive.
- Jess Stacy, 90, American jazz pianist who played with Benny Goodman.
- Jack G. Thayer, 72, American radio executive and disc jockey.
- Ralph E. Van Norstrand, 57, American politician who was Republican Speaker of the Connecticut House of Representatives.
- Arthur Earl Walker, 87, Canadian-American neurosurgeon, neuroscientist and epileptologist.
- Fred West, 53, English serial killer, suicide.
- Eugene Wigner, 92, Hungarian physicist Nobel Prize in Physics laureate, pneumonia.

=== 2 ===
- Hulbert Aldrich, 87, American banking executive who led the New York Trust Company.
- Ephraim Amu, 95, Ghanaian composer, musicologist and teacher.
- Joe Balsis, 73–74, American professional pool player.
- Siad Barre, 84–85, Somalian military leader and statesman, 3rd President of Somalia, heart attack.
- Don Elston, 65, American baseball player (Chicago Cubs, Brooklyn Dodgers).
- Harry de Keijser, 94, Dutch Olympic athlete (1924).
- Tun Mustapha, 76, Malaysian politician and Chief Minister of Sabah.
- Nancy Kelly, 73, American actress, diabetes.
- Keith McDaniel, 38, American principal dancer with the Alvin Ailey American Dance Theater and on Broadway.
- Manuel Rivera, 67, Spanish painter.
- John Rodgers, 34, American football player (Pittsburgh Steelers).
- Henry Graham Sharp, 77, British figure skater, world champion, and Olympian (1936, 1948).

=== 3 ===
- Ollie Bejma, 87, American Major League Baseball infielder (Chicago White Sox, St. Louis Browns).
- Philip Burton, 86, Irish Fine Gael politician, farmer and auctioneer.
- Bob Darnell, 64, American baseball player (Brooklyn Dodgers).
- Al Duncan, 67, American blues drummer.
- Mickey Haefner, 82, American baseball player (Washington Senators, Chicago White Sox, Boston Braves).
- Roland Harrah III, 21, American film and television child actor, musician, and artist, suicide.
- Arne Hestenes, 74, Norwegian journalist and author.
- Byron MacGregor, 46, Canadian news anchor and news director.
- Robert Marquis, 67–68, German-American architect and academic, complication during surgery.
- Robert Nesbitt, 88, English theatre director, theatrical producer and impresario.
- Edward Nugent, 90, American actor, writer, and director.
- Jacques Peten, 82, Belgian Olympic alpine skier (1936), and tennis player.
- Stanley Powell, 78, Welsh rugby footballer.
- Andrija Puharich, 76, American physician.
- Jim Tyack, 83, American baseball player (Philadelphia Athletics).
- Robley C. Williams, 86, pioneering American biophysicist and virologist.

=== 4 ===
- Naomi Amir, 63, American-Israeli pediatric neurologist.
- Ramón Artigas, 86, Spanish Olympic swimmer (1928).
- Vladas Drėma, 84, Lithuanian historian.
- Dorothy Granger, 83, American actress, cancer.
- Harry Gumbert, 85, American baseball player.
- Jim Lee Howell, 80, American football player and coach (New York Giants).
- Robert Latham, 82, British editor, scholar, and Pepys Librarian.
- Eduardo Mata, 52, Mexican conductor and composer, plane crash.
- Valery Nosik, 54, Soviet/Russian actor.
- Ralph Onis, 86, American baseball player (Brooklyn Dodgers).
- Victor Riesel, 81, American newspaper journalist and columnist, heart failure.
- Heshmat Sanjari, 77, Iranian conductor and composer.
- Brooks Stevens, 83, American graphic and industrial designer.
- Sol Tax, 87, American anthropologist who founded the academic journal Current Anthropology.

=== 5 ===
- Semi Joseph Begun, 89, German-American engineer and inventor.
- Somerset de Chair, 83, English author, politician, and poet.
- Art Demery, 80, American baseball player.
- Victor Mitchell, 71, American bridge player.
- Ben Rich, 69, American engineer and the second Director of Lockheed's Skunk Works from 1975 to 1991, esophageal cancer.
- Mansour Sattari, 46, Iranian Air Force leader, plane crash.
- Hubert Teitelbaum, 79, American district judge (United States District Court for the Western District of Pennsylvania).
- Floyd Volker, 73, American basketball player.
- Kiyoo Wadati, 92, Japanese seismologist.
- Rex Yeatman, 75, English cricketer.

=== 6 ===
- Robert Abajian, 62, American fashion designer and fashion industry executive.
- Paul-Émile Allard, 74, Canadian provincial politician.
- Philip Brady, 101, Irish Fianna Fáil politician.
- James Clay, 59, American jazz tenor saxophonist and flutist.
- Todor Diev, 60, Bulgarian football player and Olympian (1956, 1960).
- Agustín Gaínza, 72, Spanish football player.
- Michael Pickering, 53, Australian rules footballer.
- Joe Slovo, 68, ANC activist and South African minister of Housing, cancer.

=== 7 ===
- Ali Aliyev, 57, Soviet freestyle wrestler and Olympian (1960, 1964, 1968).
- Harry Golombek, 83, British chess grandmaster, chess correspondent, and author of more than 30 books on chess.
- Larry Grayson, 71, English comedian and television presenter.
- Arthur Leavins, 77, British violinist who was concertmaster of the Royal Philharmonic Orchestra.
- Walter Rand, 75, American Democratic Party politician from New Jersey.
- Murray Rothbard, 68, American economist, heart attack.
- Art Stoefen, 80, American basketball player.
- Ted Tetzlaff, 91, American cinematographer.
- Kite Thomas, 71, American baseball player (Philadelphia Athletics, Washington Senators).
- Lincoln Williams, 77, American baseball player.

=== 8 ===
- Hugó Ballya, 86, Hungarian rower and Olympian (1936).
- Beatrice Burnham, 92, American silent film actress.
- Lemuel Diggs, 95, American pathologist who specialized in sickle cell anemia and hematology.
- Loulou Gasté, 86, French composer, songwriter.
- Madhu Limaye, 72, Indian socialist essayist and activist, particularly active in the 1970s.
- Carlos Monzón, 52, Argentine boxer, traffic accident.
- Sylvia B. Seaman, 94, American novelist and suffragist.
- Cao Tianqin, 74, Chinese biochemist.
- Robert Vintousky, 92, French Olympic pole vaulter (1928).

=== 9 ===
- Óscar Mendoza Azurdia, 77, Guatemalan general and military junta leader.
- Jan Bauch, 96, Czech painter and sculptor.
- Gordon Bruce, 64, Australian politician.
- Peter Cook, 57, English comedian and writer, gastrointestinal bleeding.
- Sterling Dow, 91, American classical archaeologist, epigrapher, and professor of archaeology at Harvard University.
- Gisela Mauermayer, 81, German Olympic discus thrower (1936).
- Ralph Merrifield, 81, English museum curator and archaeologist who was director of the Museum of London.
- Gérard Simond, 90, French Olympic ice hockey player (1928).
- Stig Sjölin, 66, Swedish boxer and Olympian (1952, 1956).
- Souphanouvong, 85, Laotian royal prince and Communist leader, 1st President of Laos.
- Xie Youfa, 77, Chinese lieutenant general in the People's Liberation Army.

=== 10 ===
- Roy Ashton, 85, Australian makeup artist and tenor.
- John H. Bloomer, 64, American attorney and politician who served as President of the Vermont State Senate, accident.
- Crosby Bonsall, 74, American artist and children's book author and illustrator.
- Fred Böhler, 82, Swiss jazz keyboardist and bandleader.
- Nicholas Cavaliere, 95, American cinematographer.
- Boris Gurevich, 63, Soviet/Russian wrestler and Olympian (1952).
- George McNeil, 86, American abstract expressionist painter.
- Michael Meinecke, 53, German art historian, archaeologist, and museum director.
- Scotty Rankine, 86, Canadian long-distance runner and Olympian (1932, 1936).
- Arthur Ruysschaert, 84, Belgian football player.
- Roderick Stephens, 85–86, American sailor and yacht designer.
- Kathleen Tynan, 57, Canadian-British journalist, author, and screenwriter, cancer.

=== 11 ===
- Raf Baldassarre, 62, Italian film actor.
- Ignacio Matte Blanco, 86, Chilean psychiatrist and psychoanalyst.
- John Gere, 73, English art historian and curator at the British Museum.
- Josef Gingold, 85, Russian-American violinist.
- Les Handley, 76, Australian rules footballer.
- Mildred Barry Hughes, 92, American politician who was the first woman elected to the New Jersey Senate.
- Ad Kaland, 72, Dutch politician, member of the Senate (1977–1994).
- Onat Kutlar, 58, Turkish writer, journalist, and poet, bomb attack.
- Denis Neville, 79, English football player and manager.
- Lewis Nixon III, 76, United States Army officer, diabetes.
- Peter Pratt, 71, British opera singer and actor.
- Roque Esteban Scarpa, 80, Chilean writer, literary critic and scholar.
- Hannes Trautloft, 82, German Luftwaffe flying ace during the Spanish Civil War and World War II.
- Theodor Wisch, 87, German Waffen-SS general during World War II.
- Paul Zumthor, 79, Swiss philologist.

=== 12 ===
- Kay Aldridge, 77, American actress, lung cancer.
- Tino Carraro, 84, Italian stage, television and film actor.
- Henry Cieman, 88, Canadian Olympic racewalker (1932).
- Robert R. Coats, 84, American geologist.
- Raymond George, 77, American gridiron football player (Detroit Lions, Philadelphia Eagles), and coach.
- Takako Irie, 83, Japanese actress, pneumonia.
- Jack Lee, 74, English football player.
- George Price, 93, American cartoonist for The New Yorker magazine for six decades.
- Kenneth Sterling, 74, American medical doctor and researcher.
- Rodolfo de Zorzi, 73, Argentine footballer.

=== 13 ===
- Johnny Carroll, 57, American rockabilly musician.
- Richard Causton, 74, British businessman and author on Buddhism.
- Max Harris, 73, Australian poet, critic, and bookseller.
- Ray Johnson, 67, American artist, suicide.
- David Looker, 81, British bobsledder.
- Walter Sheridan, 69, American Federal investigator who prosecuted Jimmy Hoffa.
- Mervyn Stockwood, 81, Welsh Church of England priest.
- Johann von Szabados, 88, Austrian Olympic weightlifter (1936).
- Zsigmond Villányi, 45, Hungarian modern pentathlete (1972).
- Michael Wrigley, 70, English cricketer and British Army officer.

=== 14 ===
- Joe Mike Augustine, 83, native leader and historian of the Metepenagiag Mi'kmaq Nation.
- Huang Chieh, 93, Taiwanese politician and general.
- Mark Finch, 33, English promoter of LGBTQ cinema, suicide.
- Alexander Gibson, 68, Scottish conductor.
- Barbara Jelavich, 71, American professor of history at Indiana University, cancer.
- David Elliot Johnson, 61, American 14th Bishop of Massachusetts in The Episcopal Church.
- Neil Rengel, 88, American football player (Frankford Yellow Jackets).
- Daniel Robbins, 62, American art historian, art critic, and curator, cancer.
- Stafford Somerfield, 84, British newspaper editor.
- Ruby Starr, 45, American rock singer and recording artist, cancer.
- Amos N. Wilson, 53, American writer.

=== 15 ===
- Jef Bruyninckx, 76, Belgian actor, editor and director.
- Cleo Rickman Fitch, 84, American archaeological researcher.
- Janina Kaczkowska, 90, Polish painter.
- Josef Kemr, 72, Czech actor.
- Vera Maxwell, 93, American sportswear and fashion designer.
- Vitaly Parkhimovich, 51, Soviet Russian Olympic sport shooter (1968, 1972).
- Frederick J. Schlink, 103, American consumer rights activist.
- Harry Sharp, 77, English cricketer.

=== 16 ===
- Abel Cestac, 76, Argentine boxer.
- John Charters, 81, New Zealand rower.
- Paul Delouvrier, 80, French administrator and economist.
- Bill Dillard, 83, American jazz trumpeter.
- Eric Mottram, 70, British teacher, critic, editor and poet.

=== 17 ===
- Evadne Baker, 57, English actress.
- Rolf Böger, 86, German politician of the Free Democratic Party.
- Éamonn Goulding, 61, Irish hurler and Gaelic football player.
- Wilhelm Haferkamp, 71, German politician.
- John Hall, 71, American baseball player (Brooklyn Dodgers).
- Miguel Torga, 87, Portuguese writer.

=== 18 ===
- Kay B. Barrett, 92, Hollywood talent scout and agent known for her impact on Gone with the Wind, stroke.
- Adolf Butenandt, 91, German biochemist, recipient of the Nobel Prize in Chemistry.
- John Charles Dique, 79, Australian physician and political activist.
- Clifford Fagan, 83, American basketball player.
- Roger Gilson, 47, Luxembourgish cyclist and Olympian (1968).
- Joseph Kagan, Baron Kagan, 79, Lithuanian-British industrialist.
- Ron Luciano, 57, American Major League Baseball umpire, suicide.
- Neil McIntosh, 74, Australian rules footballer.
- Ján Takáč, 85, Slovak Olympic long-distance runner (1936).

=== 19 ===
- Roy Barratt, 52, English cricketer.
- Reinhard Böhler, 49–50, German sidecarcross rider and the first-ever Sidecarcross World Championship.
- Daryl Chapin, 88, American physicist, best known for co-inventing solar cells.
- John Pearson, 3rd Viscount Cowdray, 84, British peer, businessman and polo player.
- Hubert Fol, 69, French jazz saxophonist and bandleader.
- Pedro Goić, 98, Yugoslav Olympic hammer thrower (1936).
- Charles Hauert, 86, Swiss Olympic fencer (1936).
- Hermann Henselmann, 89, German architect.
- Gene MacLellan, 56, Canadian singer-songwriter ("Snowbird", "Put Your Hand in the Hand", "The Call"), suicide.
- Patricia Teherán Romero, 25, Colombian singer and composer, traffic collision.
- Italo Viglianesi, 79, Italian trade unionist politician and syndicalist.

=== 20 ===
- Thomas Arbuthnott, 83, New Zealand Olympic boxer (1936).
- Mehdi Bazargan, 87, 46th Prime Minister of Iran, heart attack.
- Mark Filley, 82, American baseball player (Washington Senators).
- Buddy Gremp, 75, American baseball player (Boston Braves).
- Garrett Howard, 95, Irish hurler.
- Nobuo Kaneko, 71, Japanese actor.
- Arthur MacDonald, 75, Australian Army officer and Chief of the General Staff.
- Franklin E. Sigler, 70, American soldier, Medal of Honor recipient.
- Norris Weese, 43, American gridiron football player (Denver Broncos), bone cancer.

=== 21 ===
- Armando Alemán, 90, Spanish Olympic fencer (1928).
- Russ Bauers, 80, Major League Baseball player (Pittsburgh Pirates, Chicago Cubs, St. Louis Browns).
- Kenneth Budd, 69, English mural artist.
- Philippe Casado, 30, French professional road bicycle racer.
- Alex Groza, 68, American basketball player (Kentucky Wildcats, Indianapolis Olympians), and Olympian (1948).
- John Halas, 82, Hungarian animator.
- Edward Hidalgo, 82, United States Secretary of the Navy in the Carter administration.
- George Kinek, 66, American football player (Chicago Cardinals).
- Joseph Mruk, 91, American businessman and Republican politician.
- Bernard L. Oser, 95, American biochemist and food scientist.
- Sidney Slon, 84, American radio and television writer and actor.
- Attila Szekrényessy, 82, Hungarian figure skater and Olympian (1936).
- John Coyle White, 70, American chairman of the Democratic National Committee.

=== 22 ===
- Jerry Blackwell, 45, professional wrestler, pneumonia.
- Eric Cunningham, 37, American football player (New York Jets).
- Stuart Davies, 88, British aerospace engineer.
- Lawrie Fernandes, 66, Indian Olympic field hockey player (1948).
- Henry Gladstone, American radio newscaster and actor, heart failure.
- Rose Kennedy, 104, American philanthropist, pneumonia.
- Christopher Palmer, 48, British composer.
- Hilda Smith, 85, British Olympic gymnast (1928).
- Giulio Turcato, 82, Italian artist.

=== 23 ===
- Donald Collier, 83, American archaeologist, ethnologist, and museologist.
- Steve Fowdy, 79, American basketball player.
- Albertis Harrison, 88, American politician and jurist who was the 59th governor of Virginia.
- Ken Hill, 57, English playwright and director, cancer.
- György Libik, 75, Hungarian Olympic alpine skier (1948).
- Peter Luke, 75, British writer, editor, and producer.
- Carl Mulleneaux, 80, American gridiron football player (Green Bay Packers).
- Nilesh Naik, 24, Indian environmental activist.
- Helen Phillips, 81, American sculptor.
- Saul Rogovin, 72, American professional baseball player, bone cancer.
- Edward Shils, 84, American sociologist and professor at the University of Chicago.
- Egidio Viganò, 74, Italian Roman Catholic priest.

=== 24 ===
- Alf Clay, 81, Australian rules footballer.
- David Cole, 32, American record producer, meningitis.
- Edward Colman, 89, American cinematographer (Mary Poppins, The Absent-Minded Professor, That Darn Cat!).
- Leopoldo Máximo Falicov, 61, Argentine theoretical physicist.
- Ross Fielder, 69, Australian rugby league footballer.
- Al Hessberg, 78, American college football player and lawyer.
- Anton Idzkovsky, 87, Ukrainian football player and manager.
- Herb Karpel, 77, American baseball player (New York Yankees).
- Regina Linnanheimo, 79, Finnish actor and screenwriter.
- Shokichi Nanba, 83, Japanese Olympic rower (1932).
- Eom Par-yong, 63, South Korean Olympic sprinter (1952).
- Victor Reinganum, 87–88, British artist and illustrator.
- Sergio Rolandi, 67, Italian Olympic sports shooter (1960).
- Kermit Smith Jr., 37, American convicted murderer, execution by lethal injection.

=== 25 ===
- George P. Baker, 91, fifth dean of the Harvard Business School.
- Fritz Dorls, 84, German far-right politician and former Nazi Party member.
- Erich Hof, 58, Austrian football player and coach, lung cancer.
- Aage Jensen, 79, Danish Olympic rower (1936).
- John Smith, 63, American actor (Laramie, Cimarron City, Circus World), cirrhosis.
- Suzanne Storrs, 60, American beauty queen and actress.
- William Sylvester, 72, American actor (2001: A Space Odyssey, Gemini Man, Gorgo).
- Albert W. Tucker, 89, Canadian mathematician.
- Hans van Wijnen, 57, Dutch Olympic volleyball player (1964).

=== 26 ===
- Ole Ålgård, 74, Norwegian diplomat.
- Franz Allers, 89, American conductor.
- Charles Altemose, 81, American soccer player and Olympian (1936).
- Marcel Bidot, 92, French professional road bicycle racer who won two stages of the Tour de France.
- Vic Buckingham, 79, English footballer and manager.
- William Cammisano, 80, American mobster and member of the Kansas City crime family, kidney failure.
- Alan Fitcher, 86, Australian rules footballer.
- Louis Heren, 75, British journalist.
- Alaric Jacob, 85, British writer.
- Bernardo Leighton, 85, Chilian politician, cardiovascular disease.
- Gordon Oliver, 84, American actor and film producer.
- Geoffrey Parsons, 65, Australian pianist, cancer.
- Rocco Pirro, 78, American football player (Pittsburgh Steelers, Buffalo Bills).
- John Vaughan-Morgan, Baron Reigate, 89, British politician.
- Carlos Rodríguez-Feo, 89, Cuban Olympic sports shooter (1948).
- Cecil Roy, 94, American actress.
- Zeng Shaoshan, 80, Chinese politician.
- Kurama Tatsuya, 42, Japanese sumo wrestler.
- Dick Tettelbach, 65, American baseball player (New York Yankees, Washington Senators).
- Ian Tomlinson, 58, Australian jumper and Olympian (1960, 1964).
- Pat Welsh, 79, American actress (E.T. the Extra-Terrestrial), pneumonia.

=== 27 ===
- Raynald Arseneault, 49, Canadian composer and organist.
- Alexis Brimeyer, 48, pretender who claimed connection to various European thrones, AIDS-related complications.
- Bob Chandler, 45, American gridiron football player (Buffalo Bills, Oakland/Los Angeles Raiders), lung cancer.
- Richard A. Moore, 81, American lawyer and communications executive and ambassador, prostate cancer.
- Raphael M. Robinson, 83, American mathematician.
- Jean Tardieu, 91, French dramatist, artist, and musician.

=== 28 ===
- Philip Burton, 90, Welsh theatre director, producer, and teacher.
- Aldo Gordini, 73, French racecar driver.
- James P. Grant, 72, Canadian-American diplomat, children's advocate, and Director of UNICEF.
- Richard L. Roudebush, 77, American politician, member of the United States House of Representatives (1961-1971).
- Ferruccio Tagliavini, 81, Italian opera singer.
- George Woodcock, 82, Canadian writer, philosopher, essayist and literary critic.

=== 29 ===
- Antonio Brivio, 89, Italian Olympic bobsledder (1936), and racing driver.
- Dickie Burnell, 77, English rower and Olympic medalist (1948).
- Guy Clutton-Brock, 88, English social worker and later a Zimbabwean nationalist.
- Joseph Aubin Doiron, 72, Canadian politician.
- James Lawrence, 87, American Olympic rower (1928).
- Dick Molloy, 76, Australian rules footballer.
- Kuldar Sink, 52, Estonian composer and flautist.
- Song Sung-il, 25, South Korean wrestler and Olympian (1992), stomach cancer.
- Antony Warr, 81, English sportsman.

=== 30 ===
- Angela Calomiris, 78, American photographer and secret FBI informant.
- Robert Craig, 77, Scottish academic and church leader.
- Mumtaz Daultana, 78, Indian politician.
- Gerald Durrell, 70, British naturalist, author, and television presenter.
- George James, 88, American jazz saxophonist.
- Arthur Julian, 71, American television writer and producer (Gimme a Break!, Amen, The Carol Burnett Show).
- Olga Modrachová, 64, Czechoslovak Olympic high jumper (1952, 1956).
- George Poyser, 84, English footballer and manager.

=== 31 ===
- George Abbott, 107, American writer, director, and producer, stroke.
- Leo Joseph Brust, 79, American Catholic bishop.
- Paul Collins, 68, Canadian long-distance runner and Olympian (1952).
- Bernard N. Fields, 56, American microbiologist and virologist, pancreatic cancer.
- Jack Foster, 82, Australian rules footballer.
- James Johnson, 86, English MP..
- Gerhart Lüders, 74, German physicist.
- Kerttu Saalasti, 87, Finnish politician.
- John Smith, 74, longtime chairman of Liverpool F.C.
- George Stibitz, 90, American computational engineer.
- James Wilson, 94, American long-distance motorcyclist and author.
- André Wollscheidt, 80, Luxembourgian Olympic boxer (1936).
