= Ålgård (disambiguation) =

Ålgård is a village in Gjesdal municipality in Rogaland county, Norway.

Ålgård or Aalgaard may also refer to:

== Places ==
- Ålgård Church, a church in Gjesdal municipality in Rogaland county, Norway
- Old Ålgård Church, a church in Gjesdal municipality in Rogaland county, Norway

== People with the surname ==
- Gabriel Ålgård (1952–2015), Norwegian politician for the Conservative Party
- Gabriel Aalgaard (1881–1973), Norwegian agriculturalist and politician
- Ole Ålgård (1921–1995), Norwegian diplomat to China and the United Nations

== Other ==
- Ålgård FK, a Norwegian football club located in Ålgård
- Ålgård Line, a closed, but not abandoned, railway line between Ganddal and Ålgård in Norway
