= List of ambassadors of Norway to China =

Norwegian Ambassadors to China
- Emblem of Norway
- Incumbent; Vebjørn Dysvik since August 28, 2024
- Website: http://www.norway.cn/Embassy/

The List of diplomats of Norway to China began when diplomatic relations were established in 1851. The establishment of diplomatic relations took place during the union between Sweden and Norway, and a Norwegian-Swedish consulate general was established in Guangzhou. A vice consulate was set up in Shanghai in 1853. When the vice consulate in Shanghai became the consulate general in 1863, and the consulate general in Guangzhou was upgraded to a vice consulate.

When the union of Norway and Sweden was ended in 1905, Norway sent the consul-general, Thorvald Hansen, to Shanghai. And there was a vice consulate, Jørgen Jacob Eitzen, in Hong Kong.

The Norwegian legation in Beijing was established in 1919. It was merged with the consulate general in Shanghai in 1930 (after the Nationalist Government moved to Nanjing in 1928) and remained until 1954. And there was an embassy in Chongqing from 1943 to 1945 during the war time.

== List of ministers ==
- Johan Wilhelm Michelet (1921–1928, Beijing)
- Nicolai Aall (1928–1938)
- Terje Knudtzon (1938–1943)

== List of ambassadors ==
- Alf Hassel (1943–1945, Chongqing)
- Nicolai Aall (1945–1949)
- Finn Koren (1949–1954)

The Republic of China ended foreign relationship with Norway in 1950.

The People's Republic of China established foreign relationship with Norway at October 5, 1954.

- Nicolai Geelmuyden (1954–1955)
- Ernest Krogh-Hansen (1955–1959)
- Erik Dons (1959–1963)
- Helge Akre (1963–1967)
- Ole Ålgård (1967–1971)
- Per Galby Ravne (1971–197?)
- Torleiv Anda (197?–1979)
- Tancred Ibsen, Jr. (1979–1982)
- Arne Arnesen (1982–1987)
- Jan Tore Holvik (1987–1994)
- Sverre Bergh Johansen (1994–1999)
- Haakon Baardsøn Hjelde (1999–2003)
- Tor Christian Hildan (2003–2007)
- Svein Ole Sæther (2007–2017)
- Geir Otto Pedersen (2017–2018)
- Signe Brudeset (2019–2024)
- Vebjørn Dysvik (2024–present)
