= Hauert (surname) =

Hauert is a surname. Notable people with the surname include:

- Bettina Hauert (born 1982), German golfer
- Charles Hauert (1908–1995), Swiss fencer
- Erich Hauert (born 1959), Swiss serial killer and sex offender
- Jean Hauert (1911–1988), Swiss épée fencer
- Sabine Hauert (born 1983), Swiss roboticist
- Thomas Hauert, Swiss dancer and choreographer
