= Neil McIntosh =

Neil McIntosh may refer to:

- Neil McIntosh (footballer) (1920–1995), Australian rules footballer
- Neil McIntosh (journalist) (born 1974), Scottish managing editor of BBC Online
- Neil McIntosh (paediatrician) (born 1942), Scottish paediatrician and neonatologist
- Neil McIntosh (public administrator) (born 1940), Scottish civil servant
