= Torleiv Anda =

Norwegian diplomat and politician

Torleiv Anda (20 April 1921 – 18 September 2013) was a Norwegian diplomat and politician for the Labour Party.

He studied at the University of Oslo during the 1940s. After the 1943 University of Oslo fire he was incarcerated together with hundreds of other students and shipped to "readjustment" camps in Germany. He was incarcerated in Stavern for some time, then from December 1943 he was incarcerated in Sennheim and Buchenwald until the war's end. He finally graduated with the cand.mag. degree in 1948, and spent three years in the Ministry of Social Affairs before he was hired in the cultural department of the Ministry of Foreign Affairs. He became press attaché in the United States in 1959, later in West Germany. He was also an embassy counsellor in London before returning home as assistant secretary in the Ministry of Foreign Affairs in 1970. He was promoted to sub-director in 1973.

Anda then served as an ambassador, first to PR China from 1975 to 1979, then to Canada from 1979 to 1984 and Israel from 1984 to 1989. Soon after retiring he released the book Intifada – opprør mot Israel, describing his personal views on the Israeli–Palestinian conflict. He criticized Israel over responsibility for the human rights violations in the region. Already towards the end of his ambassador tenure he had compared the situation to the German occupation of Norway. In February 1988, he was forced to issue an apology for a statement he made to reporters, comparing the Israeli state to the German government under the Nazis.

He also served as a member of the city council in Mandal, where he had bought a cabin in Skjernøysund in 1963. He resided at Jar during his diplomatic career, but moved to Mandal upon his retirement. He was decorated as a Knight, First Class of the Order of St. Olav. He died in September 2013, aged 92.

Diplomatic posts
Preceded by Per Galby Ravne	Norwegian ambassador to China; 1975–1979	Succeeded by Tancred Ibsen, Jr.
