= Ralph Nicholson =

Ralph Nicholson may refer to:

- Ralph Nicholson (cricketer) (1816–1879), English first-class cricketer
- Ralph W. Nicholson (1916–1995), American business executive, civil servant, and postmaster
- Ralph Nicholson Wornum (1812–1877), British artist, art historian and administrator
