= Hjelde =

Hjelde is a surname. Notable people with the surname include:

- Haakon Hjelde (1902–1933), Norwegian actor
- Haakon Baardsøn Hjelde (born 1941), Norwegian diplomat
- Jon Olav Hjelde (born 1972), Norwegian footballer
- Leo Hjelde (born 2003), Norwegian footballer
