= Frøen station =

Oslo metro station

Frøen
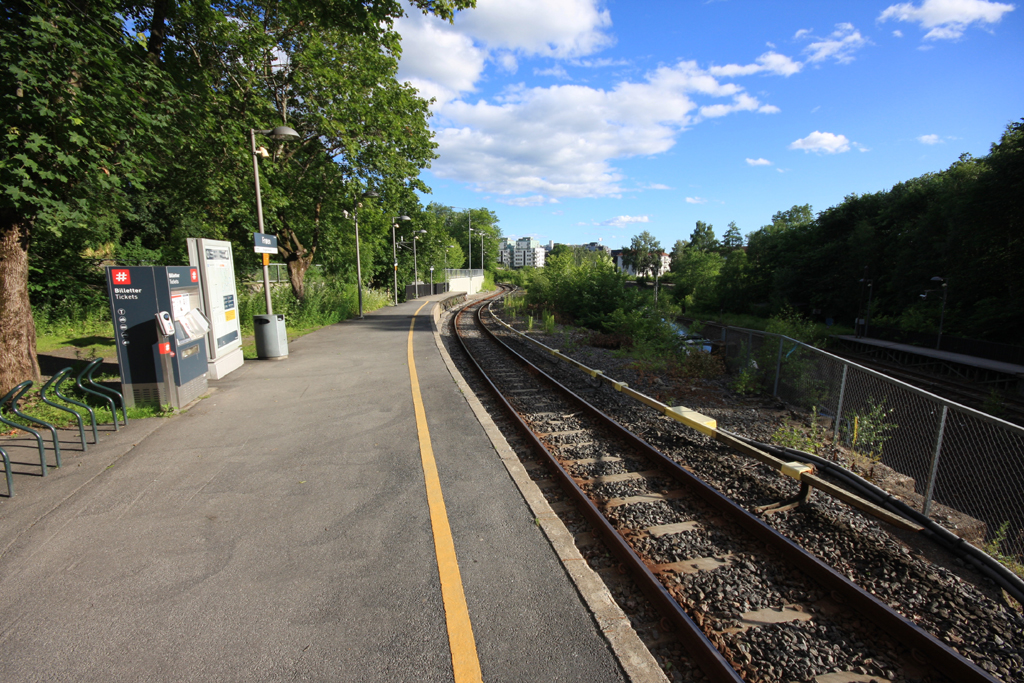
- Platform from the city center

General information
- Location: Frøen, Vestre Aker, Oslo; Norway
- Coordinates: 59°56′03″N 10°42′33″E
- Elevation: 59.7 m (196 ft)
- Owner: Sporveien
- Operator: Sporveien T-banen
- Line: Holmenkollen Line
- Distance: 3.2 km (2.0 mi) from Stortinget

Construction
- Structure type: At-grade
- Accessible: No

Other information
- Fare zone: 1

History
- Opened: 31 May 1898
- Rebuilt: 1934, 1993, 2010

Passengers
- 2008: 525 (boarding weekday average)

Services
Preceding station	Oslo Metro	Following station
Steinerud towards Frognerseteren	Line 1	Majorstuen towards Bergkrystallen
Location

Frøen is a rapid transit station of the Oslo Metro's Holmenkollen Line and previously also the Sognsvann Line. It is situated Frøen neighborhood of the Oslo, Norway, borough of Vestre Aker. Located 3.2 kilometers (2.0 mi) from Stortinget, the station is served by Line 1 of the metro every fifteen minutes. Travel time to Stortinget is six minutes. Diakonhjemmet Hospital falls within the station's catchment area.

The initial station opened on 31 May 1898. With the construction of the Sognsvann Line, Frøen became both a stop on it as well as the interchange between the two lines. It therefore received four separate platforms at three different elevations. It served trains on the Sognsvann Line from 10 October 1934 until 1992. Frøen received a slight upgrade in 2010. However, Ruter plans to close it down and replace it and Steinerud with a new station.

== History ==
Frøen was a station on the original Holmenkollen Line opened on 31 May 1898. At the time the line followed the road Slemdalsveien, in a curve past Frøen. The station took its name from Store Frøen and Lille Frøen, two farms in the area. The tram line allowed for sufficient public transport that housing development started in the area.

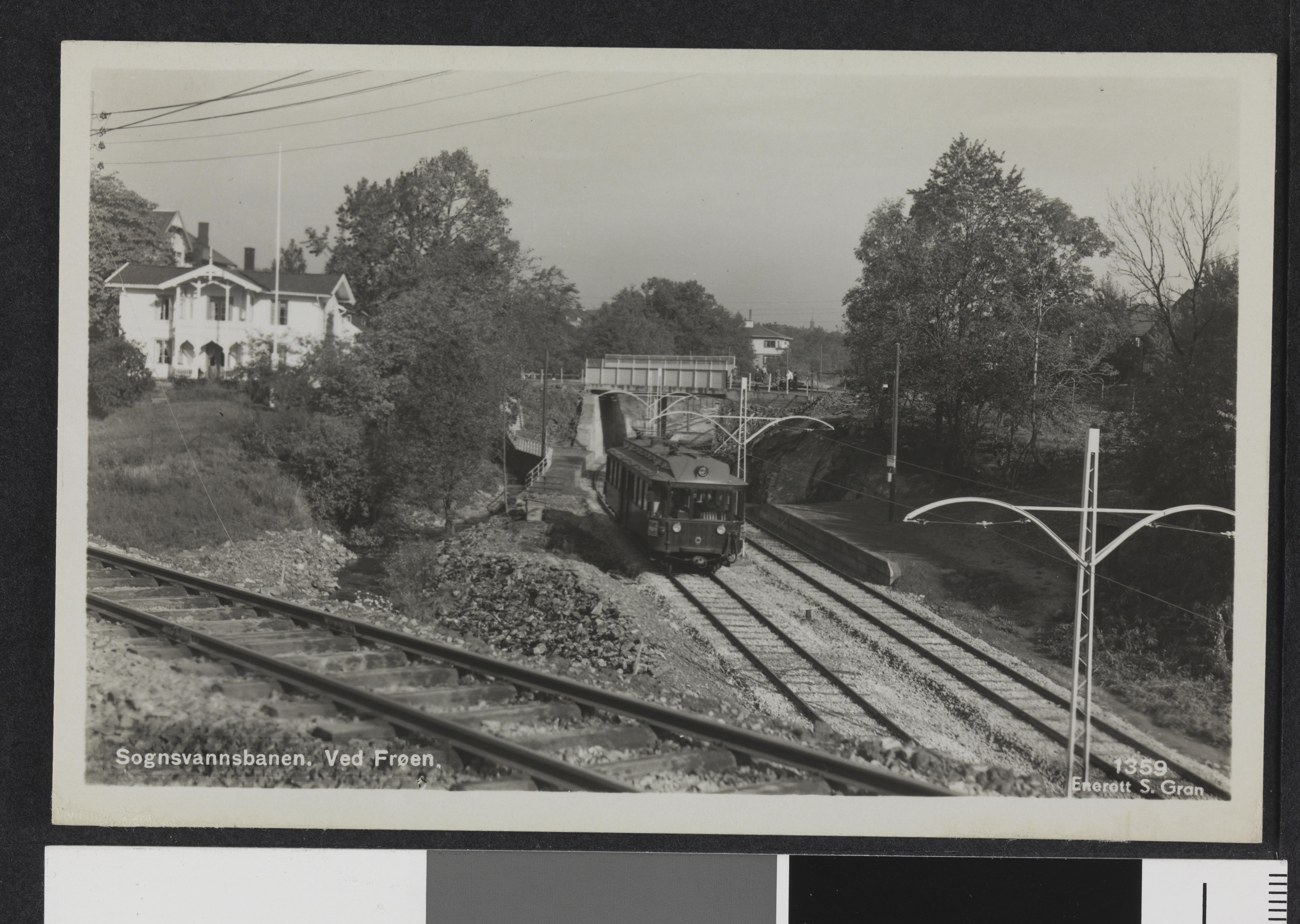
Tram stopping on the Sogsvann Line platform

Construction of the Sognsvann Line started in 1933. The branch between the two lines was set to be at Frøen. To make room, the pond of Frøensdammene were dammed up and the tracks placed on the former pondbed. An interchange was established, so there were four platforms, with separate platforms serving each of the two lines. During the Second World War a bomb was blown on the Sognsvann Line at Frøen. No-one was injured and only a few meters of track were damaged. They were quickly rebuilt. During the 1980s the platforms received a standard, blue waiting shed designed by Odd Thorsen.

The Sognsvanns Line was rebuilt to metro standard in 1993. At this time it was found that it would not be feasible to extend the platforms for that line to the nominal length of 120 meters (390 ft). It was therefore decided that the Sognsvann Line would no longer have a stop at Frøen. This was met with protests from some, as the Sognsvann Line would no longer have a suitable stop to serve Diakonhjemmet. From 1993 until the Holmenkollen Line was closed for renovations in 2009, Frøen was the site where the trains switched between third-rail and overhead wire power supply.

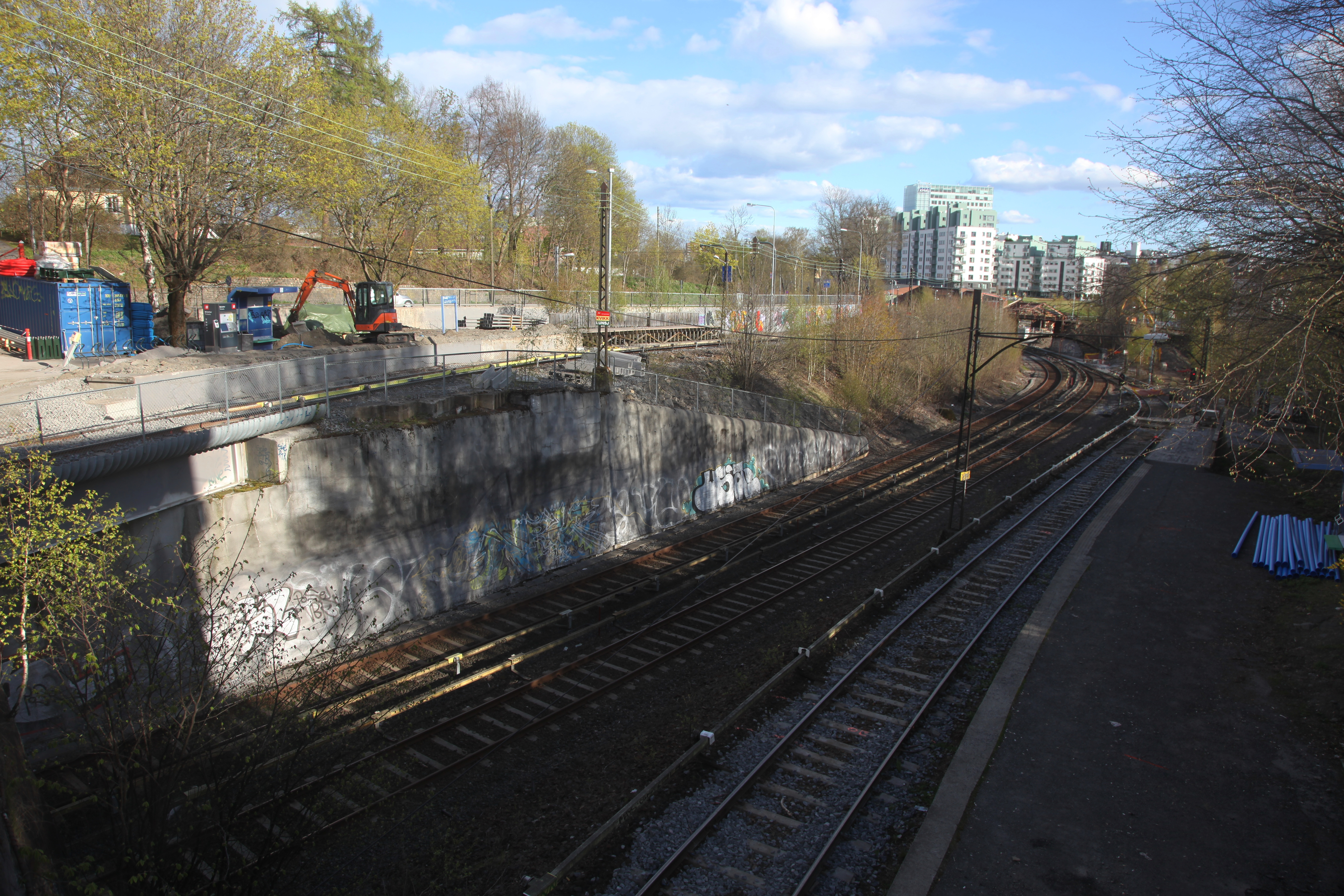
From the upgrades being carried out in 2010. The high differences are visible.

Ahead of the upgrade of the Holmenkollen Line to metro standard, there was a discussion if it should instead be connected to Oslo Tramway. In that case, the line would have had to branch off at Frøen and continue to Majorstuen, where it would connect to the Briskeby Line. This was rejected, and instead the line was renovated as a metro line. Frøen closed in 2009 and opened again on 6 December 2010. There was not time for an outright upgrade to the stations, so Frøen remains with its pre-upgrade platforms and amenities.

== Service ==
The station is served by Line 1 of the Oslo Metro. During regular hours, it operates at a 15-minute headway. Travel time to Stortinget is six minutes. Operations are carried out by Sporveien T-banen on contract with Ruter, the public transport authority in Oslo and Akershus. The infrastructure itself is owned by Sporveien, a municipal company. Service is provided using MX3000 three-car trains. The station had an average 525 boarding passengers in 2008. Although mid-range for the Holmenkollen Line, this is low for the metro overall. Frøen is located in fare zone 1.

== Facilities ==
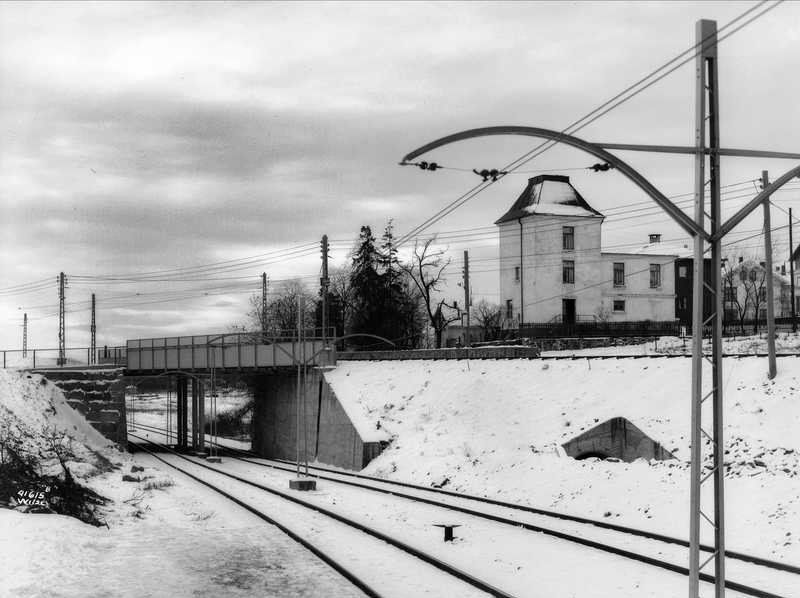
1935 image of the Holmenkollen Line's uphill track crossing over the Sognsvann Line at Frøen

Frøen is a rapid transit station situated on the Holmenkollen Line, 3.2 kilometers (2.0 mi) from Stortinget in the city center. It is situated at an elevation of 59.7 meters (196 ft) above mean sea level. The platforms are much shorter than the norm for the metro and only have space for two cars. They each feature a waiting shed and ticket machines. The platform on the platform towards the city center is the only platform of the entire metro network which lacks accessibility, as travelers must traverse a set of stairs.

The station has a unique design as it serves both as an interchange between two lines and a station. The Sognsvann Line runs at the lowest elevation in two parallel tracks. The up-bound Holmenkollen Line track branches off rises steeply and then reaches its platform. Thereafter it passes over the Songsvann Line where it meets up with the down-bound Holmenkollen Line. It runs down and meets the Songsvann Line on the other side, after passing its platform. While the Songsvann Line still used Frøen, the station therefore had four platforms. Now only two remain in use. The unusual layout means that the platforms have a significant difference in elevation

== Future ==
Ruter has announced that it intends to close Frøen Station. Both Frøen and Steinerud serve Diakonhjemmet Hospital. Neither is located particularly close, with the hospital being located about midway between the two stops. For Frøen the station is located on a curve, which gives a gap between the train and platform. It is also difficult to build a proper access system to the platforms. Also Steinerud has geographical limitations which make it unsuitable for a modern station. Ruter has therefore proposed spending 150 million Norwegian kroner on a new station which would be about midway between the two and be situated next to the hospital.
