= Vinderen (station) =

Oslo metro station

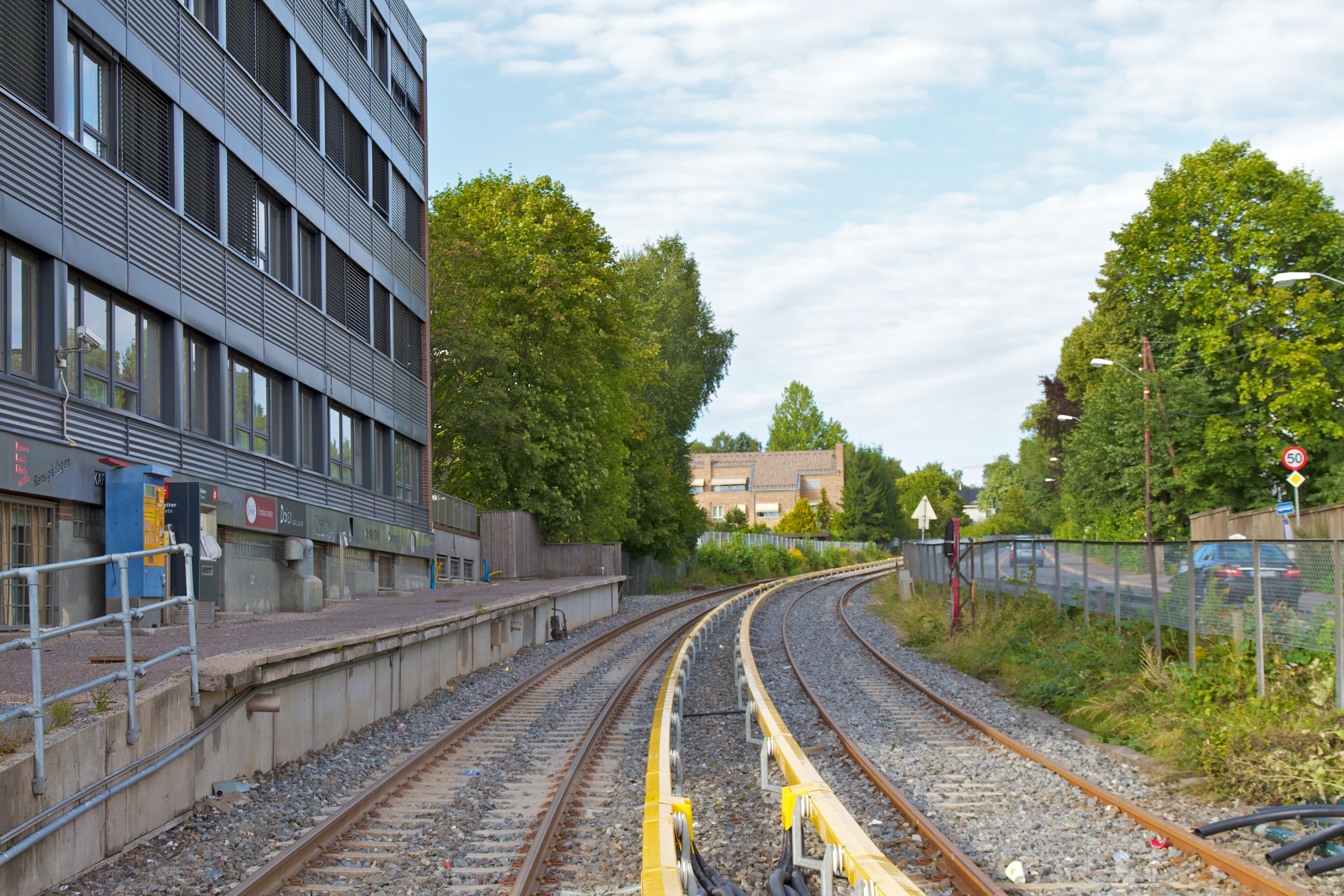

General information
- Location: Vinderen, Vestre Aker, Oslo; Norway
- Coordinates: 59°56′33″N 10°42′17″E
- Elevation: 86.6 m (284 ft)
- Owner: Sporveien
- Operator: Sporveien T-banen
- Line: Holmenkollen Line
- Distance: 4.2 km (2.6 mi) from Stortinget
- Platforms: 2 side platforms
- Tracks: 2
- Connections: Bus: 46 Ullerntoppen–Majorstuen

Construction
- Structure type: At-grade
- Accessible: Yes

Other information
- Fare zone: 1

History
- Opened: 31 May 1898

Services
Preceding station	Oslo Metro	Following station
Gaustad towards Frognerseteren	Line 1 Holmenkollen Line	Steinerud towards Bergkrystallen
Location

Vinderen is a rapid transit station of the Oslo Metro's Holmenkollen Line. It is situated Vinderen neighborhood of the Oslo, Norway, borough of Vestre Aker. Located 4.2 kilometers (2.6 mi) from Stortinget, the station is served by Line 1 of the metro every fifteen minutes. Travel time to Stortinget is nine minutes. Vinderen is neighborhood center and mostly a residential area. The platforms are located on each side of a level crossing.

The station opened with the line on 31 May 1898. A station building was erected in 1913, becoming the headquarters for the operator Holmenkolbanen. It became disused in the 1960s and demolished in 1971. Ruter is considering lowering the tracks to remove the level crossing, which would result in a new station layout under the overpass.

== History ==
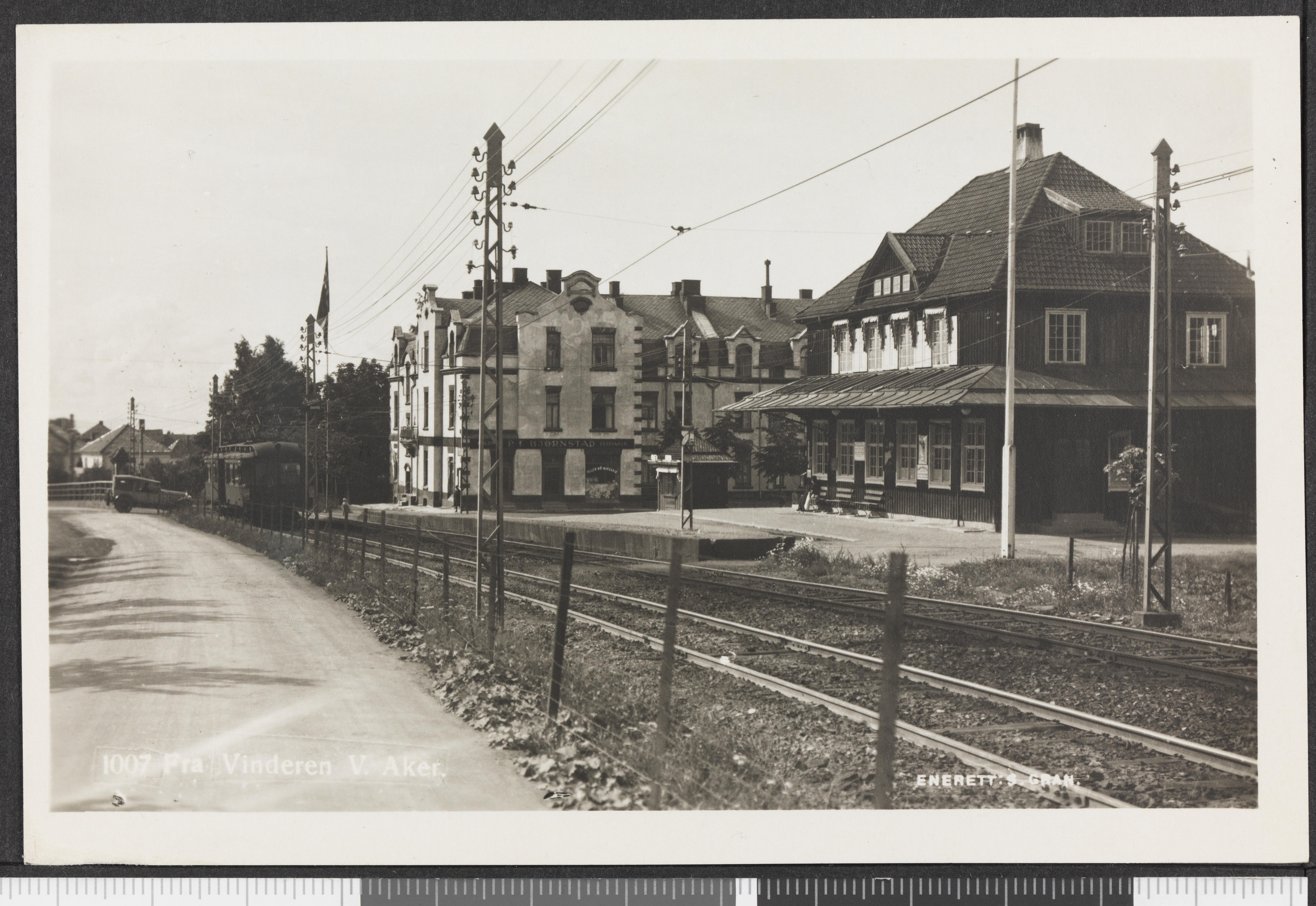
The station building in the foreground and Conditorigården behind it

Vinderen Station was established as one of the original stations along the Holmenkollen Line when it opened on 31 May 1898. Its original name was Blindernveien, although that name was scrapped only a few months later. It was placed at the intersection between Slemdalsveien and Rasmus Winderens vei. With the arrival of the line, Vinderen was opened up for housing development. Although some came immediately, it was first in the 1920s and 1930s that most of the area was developed. At the station area the first major development was Conditorigården in 1902, which still stands and was placed across the street from original platforms.

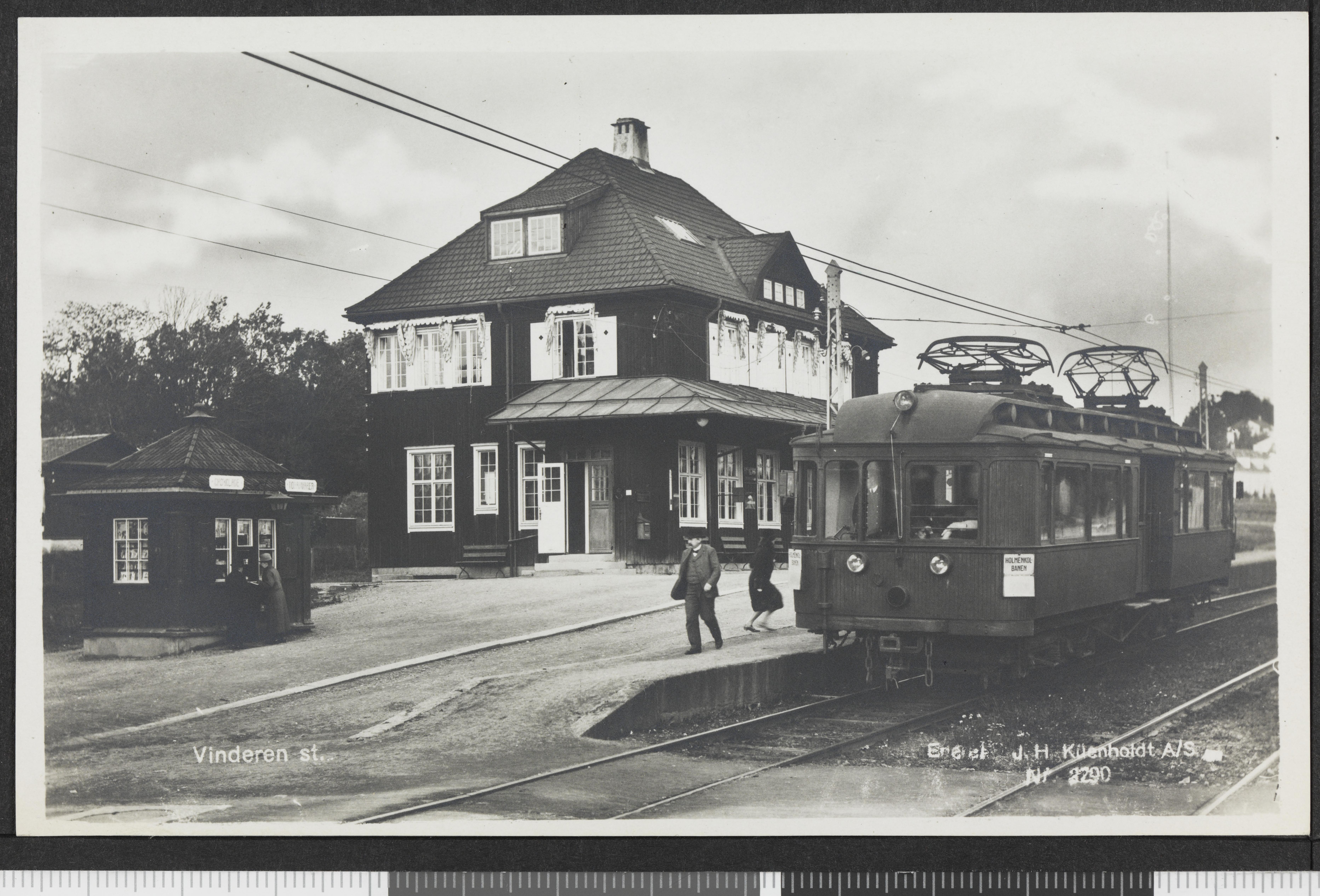
Tram stopping at the station

The station received a major upgrade in 1913, when a new station building was built. The platforms were then moved north and located at the site of the station building. Vinderen had grown as a neighborhood center with many companies. The station was mostly used for handling cargo to the city center, and featured a post office. The ground floor was used as a waiting room and for cargo handling, while the upper two floors were used by the Holmenkolbanen's administration. Previously they had been situated at the station building at Slemdal. The administration remained Vinderen until the early 1960s, when they moved to Majorstuen. The station building remained disused and soon fell into disrepair. It was demolished in 1971. The lot was sold and in 1986 the shopping center Vindertorget opened. A shed was installed at the same time.

== Service ==
The station is served by Line 1 of the Oslo Metro. During regular hours, it operates at a 15-minute headway. Travel time to Stortinget is nine minutes. Operations are carried out by Sporveien T-banen on contract with Ruter, the public transport authority in Oslo and Akershus. The infrastructure itself is owned by Sporveien, a municipal company. Service is provided using MX3000 three-car trains. The station had an average 966 boarding passengers in 2008. This is 13 short of Slemdal. These two have at least twice the ridership of any other stations on the line. These are not particularly high numbers for the metro overall. Vinderen is located in fare zone 1.

== Facilities ==
Vinderen is a rapid transit station situated on the Holmenkollen Line, 4.2 kilometers (2.6 mi) from Stortinget in the city center. It is situated at an elevation of 86.6 meters (284 ft) above mean sea level. The area immediately surrounding the station has grown up as a neighborhood center. Vinderen is largely an area with single dwellings.

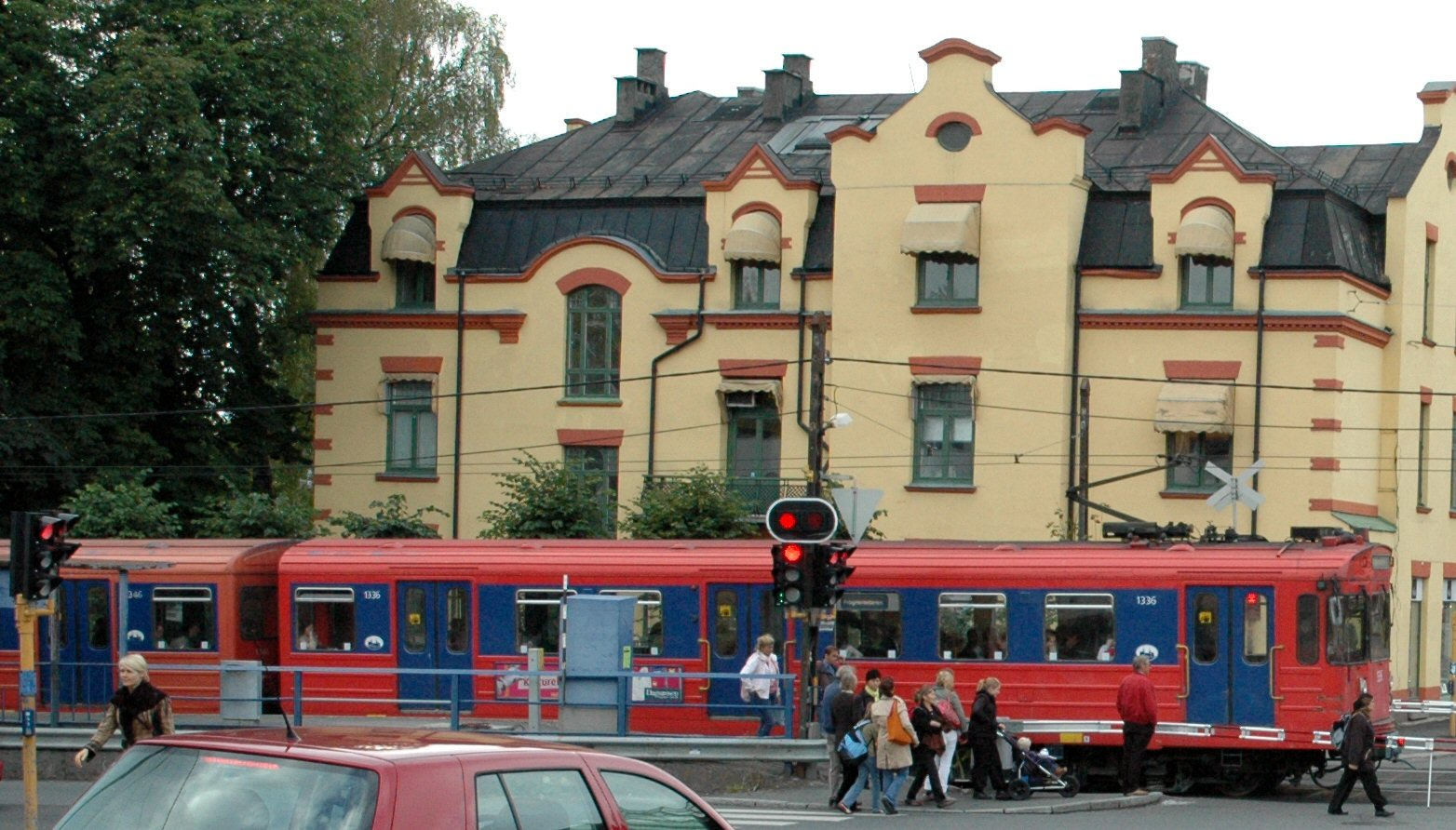
Now defunct T1300 metro train leaving the upbound platform and entering the level crossing. Conditorigården in the background

The station is situated at the intersection Vinderenkrysset, where Slemsdalsveien meets Rasmus Winderens vei. The latter crosses the line at a level crossing. The platform serving trains towards the city center is located north of the intersection, next to Vinderentorget. It has an Odd Thorsen-designed shed from the 1980s. The other platform is situated south of the intersection, across the tracks from Conditorigården. It features a smaller funkis waiting shed without walls. The platforms are much shorter than the norm for the metro and only have space for two cars. They each feature a waiting shed and ticket machines.

The station building which stood from 1913 to 1971 was designed by Carl Michalsen, of Ekman, Smith & Michaelsen. The wooden panel building as a gabled roof. On the platform side it had a pillar-supported roof covering part of the platform. The ground floor featured a waiting room, a ticket sales office, a post office and a cargo handling facility. The upper two stories were used for the line's administration.

== Future ==
Ruter is planning on upgrading the Holmenkollen Line. They want to remove all level crossings and stations along the line. This will require that the line is lowered past Vinderen so the road can pass over it on an overpass. Ruter wants to keep the station in the immediate vicinity to is current location. A 2012 report estimated this to cost 206 million Norwegian kroner.
