= Erik Dons =

Norwegian diplomat (1915–2002)

Erik Dons (2 April 1915 – 29 January 2002) was a Norwegian diplomat.

He was born in Horten as a son of navy captain Hans Fleischer Dons (1882–1940) and his wife Hilda Marie Høyer. He finished his secondary education in 1934, and graduated from the Royal Frederick University with the cand.jur. degree in 1939. He started working in the Norwegian Ministry of Foreign Affairs in 1940, and followed the political leadership into exile in London during the Second World War. He was promoted to assistant secretary in 1949. He was a counsellor to the Norwegian United Nations delegation from 1952, and was present in the delegations to the General Assembly from 1946 to 1955. He also represented Norway in the International Refugee Organization's general council in 1949 and 1951, and in the United Nations Economic and Social Council delegation from 1954 to 1956. He served as ambassador to Thailand, Indonesia and the Philippines from 1956 to 1959, the People's Republic of China from 1959 to 1964 and Portugal from 1964 to 1966. He was succeeded by Jørgen Finne-Grønn. He was hired as a special adviser in the Ministry of Foreign Affairs in 1967, and from 1976 to 1981 he was Norway's ambassador to East Germany. He then worked in the Ministry of Foreign Affairs again, until 1985. He wrote two books, Norsk statsborgerrett (1947) and FN i arbeid (1949).

He was decorated as a Knight, First Class of the Order of St. Olav (1958) and held the Grand Cross of the Order of the Crown of Thailand. His Order of St. Olav was upgraded to Commander in 1978. He died in January 2002 and was buried in Ris, Oslo, having lived at Vinderen in his later life.

Diplomatic posts
Preceded by Ernest Krogh-Hansen	Norwegian ambassador to China; 1959–1964	Succeeded by Helge Akre
