= Steinerud (station) =

Oslo metro station

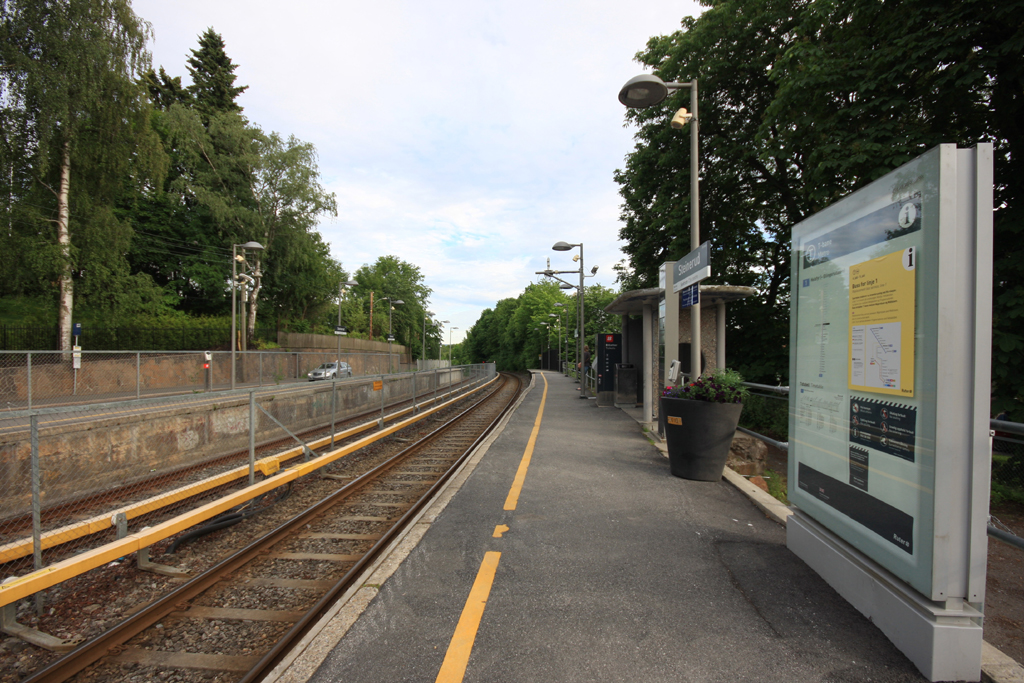

General information
- Location: Vestre Aker, Oslo; Norway
- Coordinates: 59°56′19″N 10°42′16″E
- Elevation: 75.6 m (248 ft)
- Owner: Sporveien
- Operator: Sporveien T-banen
- Line: Holmenkollen Line
- Distance: 3.8 km (2.4 mi) from Stortinget
- Platforms: 2 side platforms
- Tracks: 2

Construction
- Structure type: At-grade
- Accessible: Yes

Other information
- Fare zone: 1

History
- Opened: 1900
- Rebuilt: 2010

Services
Preceding station	Oslo Metro	Following station
Vinderen towards Frognerseteren	Line 1	Frøen towards Bergkrystallen
Location

Steinerud is a rapid transit station of the Oslo Metro's Holmenkollen Line. It is situated in the Steinerud neighborhood of the Oslo, Norway, borough of Vestre Aker. Located 3.8 kilometers (2.4 mi) from Stortinget, the station is served by Line 1 of the metro every fifteen minutes. Travel time to Stortinget is seven minutes. Diakonhjemmet Hospital falls within the station's catchment area.

The station opened in 1900. Originally named Diakonhjemmet, it received a station building in Swiss chalet style. It took the current name in 1936. With an average 196 weekday boarding passengers, Steinerud is among the least-used station of the metro. Ruter has proposed closing the station and replacing it and Frøen with a new one closer to the hospital.

== History ==
The Holmenkollen Line opened in 1898, but originally did not have a stop at Steinerud. Diakonhjemmet Hospital was opened in 1900, and there was a need for a station to serve it. A site at found at the intersection of Stasjonsveien, Lille Borgenveien and Sverrestien. Slemdalsveien cross the Holmenkollen Line at the station. Initially there was easy access to the hospital. The station opened in 1900, originally named Diakonhjemmet. In addition to platforms, Holmenkolbanen built a station building at the station. It was mostly used as a residence, although it originally had a waiting room on the ground floor. It is not known how long the building served as a waiting room.

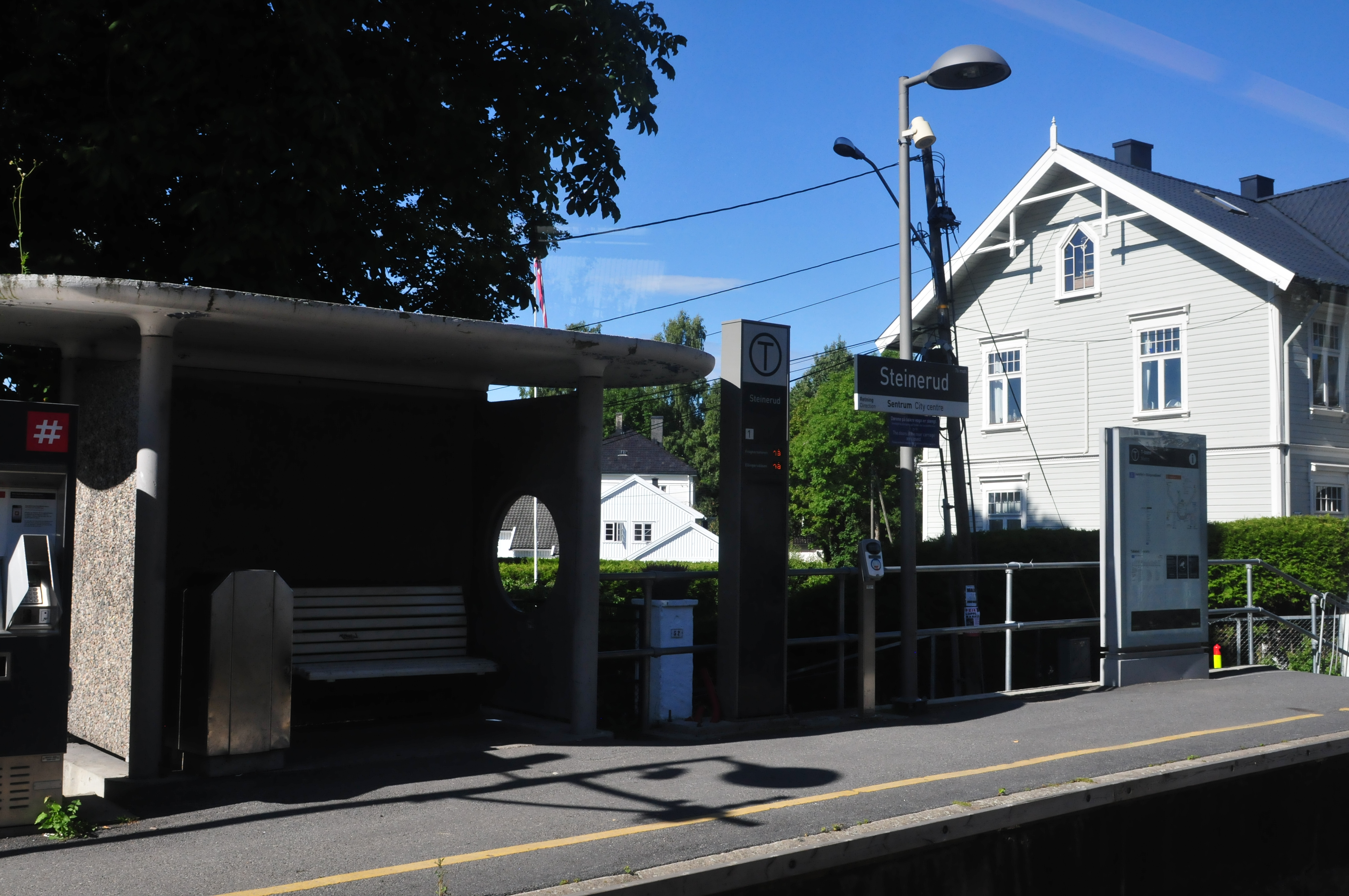
The Telje-Torp-Aasen shed and the Swiss chalet style station building

After a while the intersection at the station proved to be hazardous, and the level crossing was closed. This caused many visitors to not find their way to the hospital. Visitors were therefore encouraged to instead use Frøen which, although further away, was easier to find. This led to the need for a new name for the station. The hospital was built on the grounds of a farm named Steinerud. The name was met with some opposition, as many locals preferred the more conservative form Stenerud. The station was upgraded in the 1970s with a standard concrete shed.

== Service ==
The station is served by Line 1 of the Oslo Metro. During regular hours, it operates at a 15-minute headway. Travel time to Stortinget is seven minutes. Operations are carried out by Sporveien T-banen on contract with Ruter, the public transport authority in Oslo and Akershus. The infrastructure itself is owned by Sporveien, a municipal company. Service is provided using MX3000 three-car trains. The station had an average 196 boarding passengers in 2008. This is fourth-lowest for the Holmenkollen Line and amongst the lowest for the metro overall. Steinerud is located in fare zone 1.

== Facilities ==
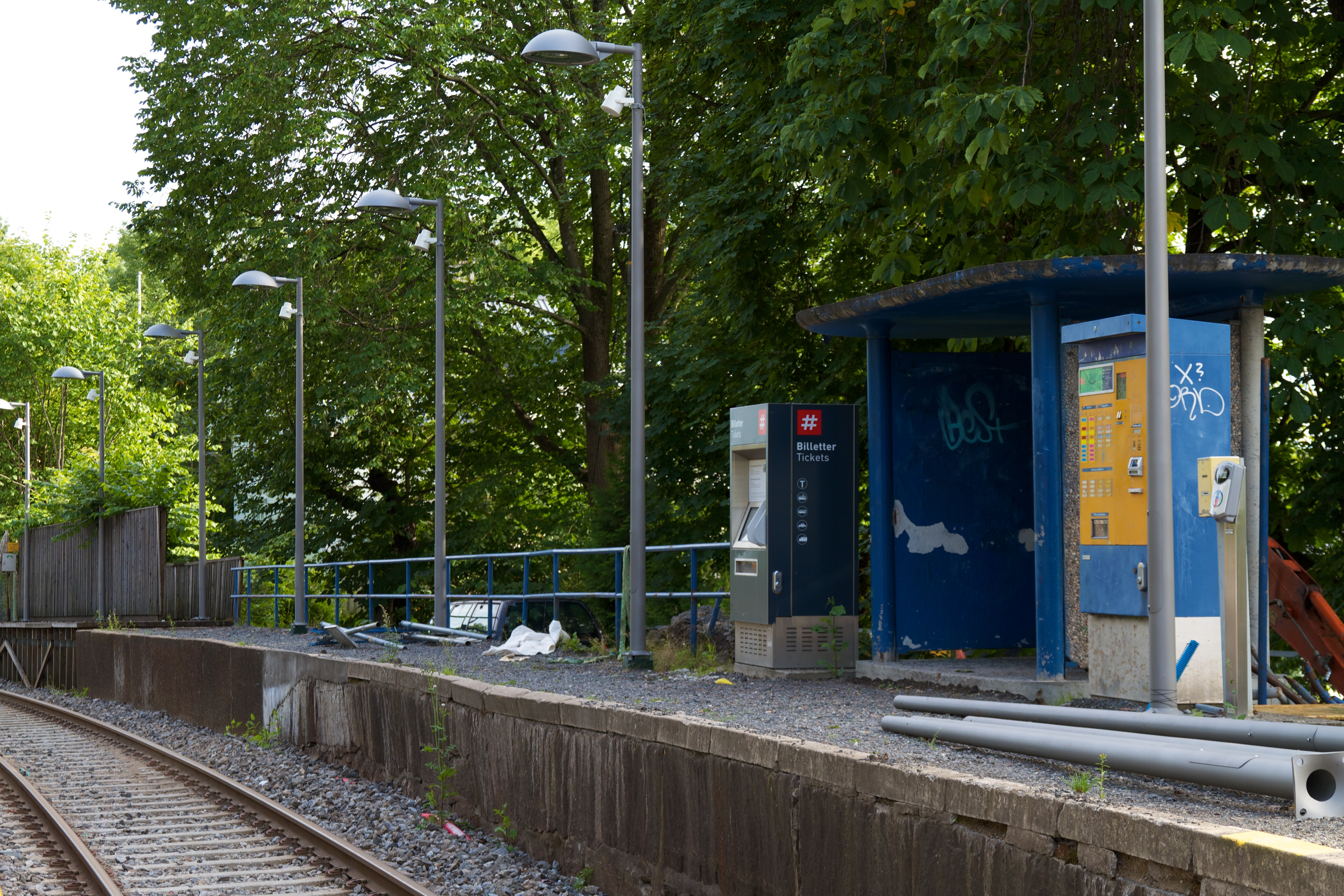
The inbound platform during the 2010 renovations of the station

Steinerud is a rapid transit station situated on the Holmenkollen Line, 3.8 kilometers (2.4 mi) from Stortinget in the city center. It is situated at an elevation of 75.6 meters (248 ft) above mean sea level. The platforms are much shorter than the norm for the metro and only have space for two cars. They are parallel and were both originally built in granite. They have since been raised and lengthened with concrete, wood and asphalt. On the platform serving trains towards the city center there is a prefabricated shed designed by Telje-Torp-Aasen. It is built on a foundation which indicates that a wooden shed designed by Erik Glosimodt was to be placed there, but it is uncertain if this structure was ever built. Just north of the platforms is a level crossing for pedestrians.

The station building was a multi-apartment house built in Swiss chalet style, common for the period and area. The building is two full stories and has a half-story with a gabled roof. It has wooden paneling. It was a prefabricated by Strømmen Trævarefabrik, and an identical station building was built at Gaustad Station.

== Future ==
Ruter has announced that it intends to close Steinerud Station. Both Frøen and Steinerud serve Diakonhjemmet Hospital. Neither is located particularly close, with the hospital being located about midway between the two stops. Both stations also have limitations and are difficult to modernize and expand as they are located on curves. Ruter has therefore proposed spending 150 million Norwegian kroner on a new station which would be about midway between the two and be situated next to the hospital. Sporveien plans to remove the level crossing at the station when the line is fully upgraded.
