= Gaustad (station) =

Oslo metro station

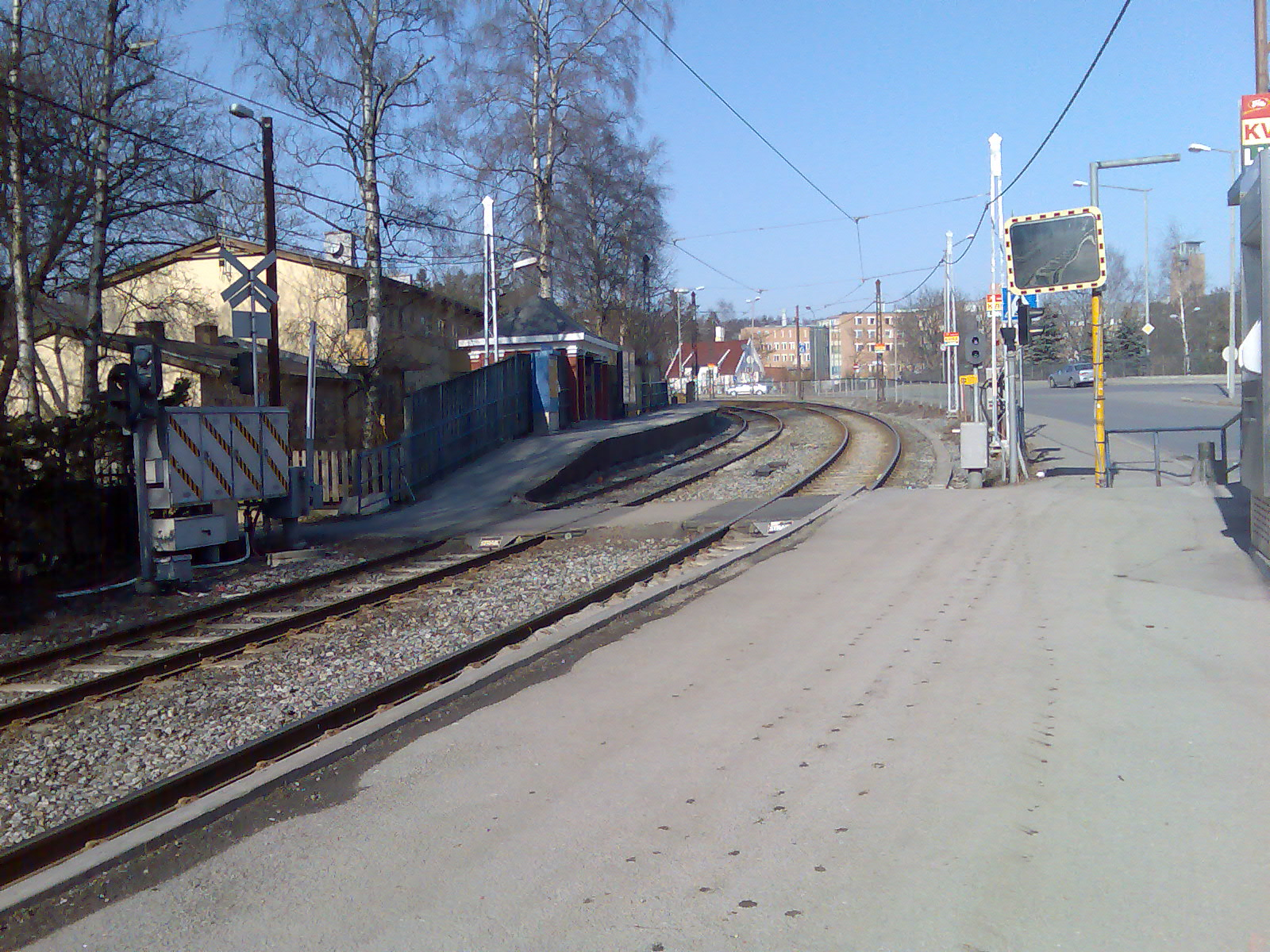

General information
- Location: Gaustad, Oslo; Norway
- Coordinates: 59°56′44″N 10°42′37″E
- Elevation: 101.4 m (333 ft) AMSL
- Owner: Sporveien
- Operator: Sporveien T-banen
- Line: Holmenkollen Line
- Distance: 4.7 km (2.9 mi) from Stortinget
- Connections: Bus: 23 Lysaker–Simensbråten; 24 Fornebu–Brynseng

Construction
- Structure type: At-grade
- Accessible: Yes

History
- Opened: 31 May 1898

Services
| Preceding station | Oslo Metro | Following station |
|---|---|---|
| Ris towards Frognerseteren | Line 1 Holmenkollen Line | Vinderen towards Bergkrystallen |
Location

Gaustad is a rapid transit station of the Oslo Metro's Holmenkollen Line. It is situated Gaustad neighborhood of the Oslo, Norway, borough of Vestre Aker. Located 4.7 kilometers (2.9 mi) from Stortinget, the station is served by Line 1 of the metro every fifteen minutes. Travel time to Stortinget is ten minutes. The National Hospital and several research institutes fall within the station's catchment area.

The station opened on 31 May 1898. A station building was constructed in 1903, and served as a waiting room until 1916. From then a waiting shed was used. The station is being considered for a lengthening of the platforms, but this is difficult due to it being located in a sharp curve.

== History ==
Gaustad Station was opened along with the rest of the Holmenkollen Line on 31 May 1898. Villa Birkely was built in 1903, and functioned as a station building. At the time the platforms in both directions were located in front of the house. As part of a line-wide renovation, a standard waiting shed was built, designed by Erik Glosimodt, which was installed in 1916. The platform was at this time moved northwards and by then the indoor waiting room was closed.

The arrival of the station spurred housing development in the area. After the 1940s the area also received some condominiums. The National Hospital was moved to Gaustad in 1999, falling within the catchment area of the station. The station closed in 2009 for the line to be upgraded, and opened again on 6 December 2010. There was not time for an outright upgrade to the stations, so Gaustad remains with its pre-upgrade platforms and amenities.

== Service ==
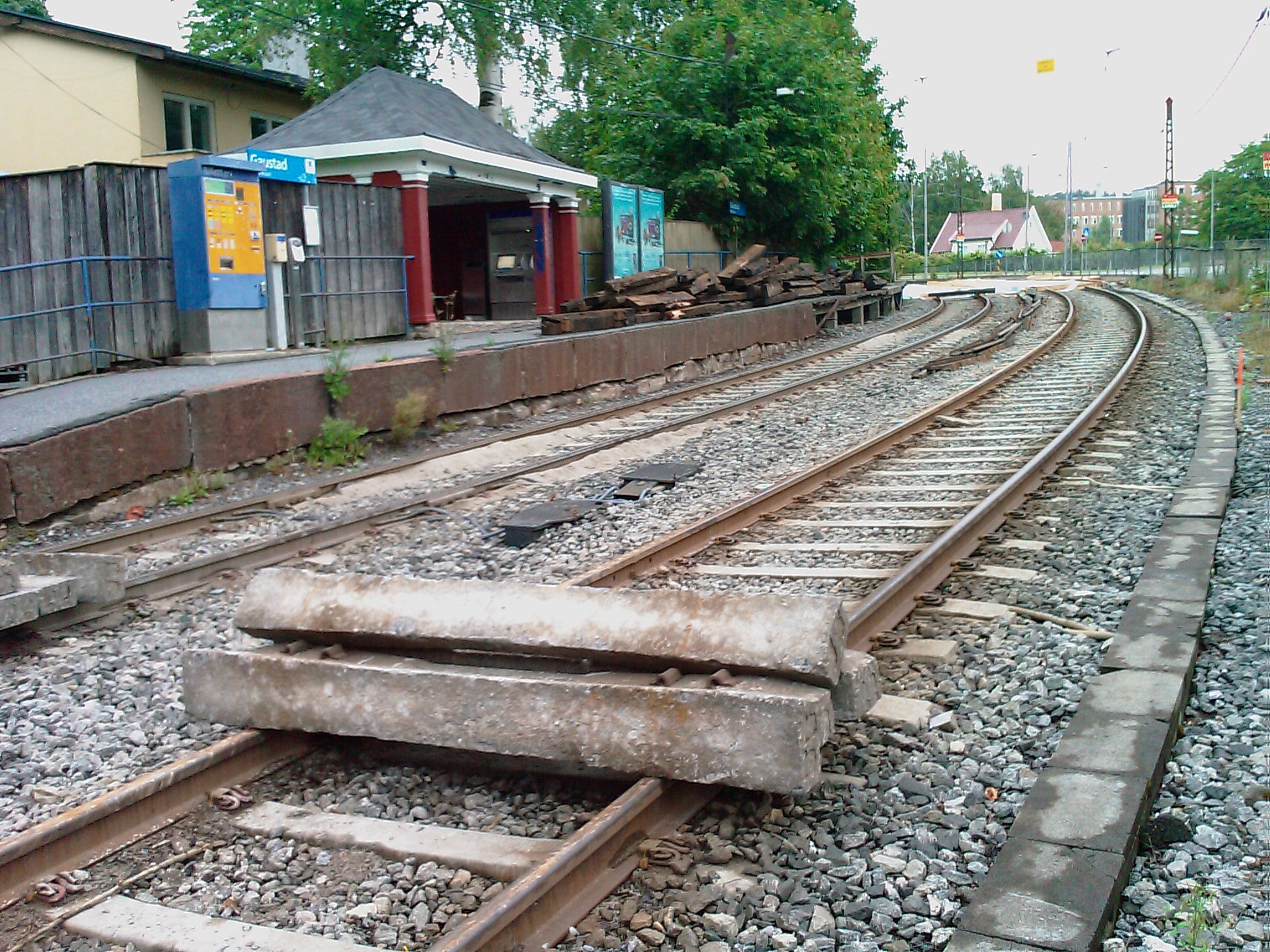
The station while it was closed in 2009 for renovations

The station is served by Line 1 of the Oslo Metro. During regular hours, it operates at a 15-minute headway. Travel time to Stortinget is ten minutes. Operations are carried out by Sporveien T-banen on contract with Ruter, the public transport authority in Oslo and Akershus. The infrastructure itself is owned by Sporveien, a municipal company. Service is provided using MX3000 three-car trains. The station had an average 507 boarding passengers in 2008. Although mid-range for the Holmenkollen Line, this is low for the metro overall. Gaustad is located in fare zone 1.

Unlike most of the stations on the Holmenkollen Line, Gaustad does not primarily serve a residential area. It is situated 400 meters (1,300 ft) from the National Hospital and the research facilities in Forskningsveien. The station is located within walking distance to at least parts of the University of Oslo campus at Blindern, although these are much better served by the Sognsvann Line. The station is located adjacent to a bus stop with the same name on Ring 3, and as such is an important transfer station for the Holmenkollen Line.

== Facilities ==
Gaustad is a rapid transit station situated on the Holmenkollen Line, 4.7 kilometers (2.9 mi) from Stortinget in the city center. It is situated at an elevation of 101.4 meters (333 ft) above mean sea level. The station is situated in a sharp curve with a 200-meter (660 ft) radius. The inbound platform is located to the north of the outbound platform, giving an asymmetrical layout. The platforms are much shorter than the norm for the metro and only have space for two cars. There is a waiting shed on the inbound platform designed by Erik Glosimodt.

The original station building, Villa irkely, was a Swiss chalet style residential house. The ground floor was initially a waiting room, while the upper stories had four apartments which were rented out. The building is paneled in wood and has a gabled roof. The building was manufactured by Strømmen Trævarefabrik. A similar station building was erected at Steinerud Station.

== Future ==
There are plans to upgrade the Holmenkollen Line to full metro standard, which includes new platforms. Gaustad represents a conundrum for the planners. It is situated close to Vinderen and Ris; had it not been for it serving important working places this would have caused it to be closed. The station is also located on a curve. The new standard does not allow platforms to be situated on curves, to avoid a gap. There is also limited space in the area, making it difficult to widen the platforms. Should the line receive a further upgrade, both platforms will probably be extended southwards to reach a sufficient length. Another alternative is an outright closure of the station.
