= Ernest Krogh-Hansen =

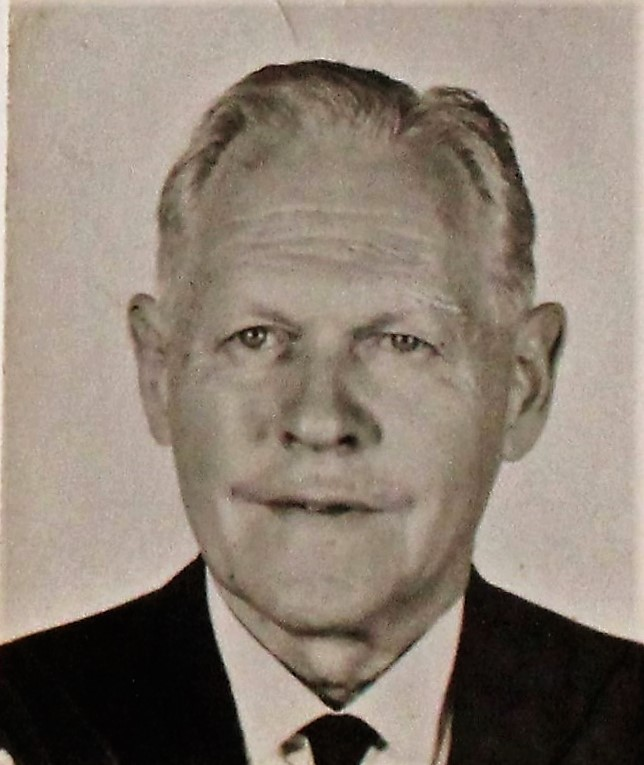
- Born: 8 September 1896; Tønsberg, Norway
- Died: 1975 (aged 78–79)
- Occupations: Diplomat and ambassador
- Awards: Order of St. Olav; Order of Orange-Nassau; Order of the Aztec Eagle; Order of Polonia Restituta; Order of Civil Merit (Bulgaria)

Ernest Krogh-Hansen (8 September 1896 – 1975) was a Norwegian civil servant, diplomat and ambassador.

He was born in Tønsberg to ship owner Hans Krogh-Hansen and Magdalene Ambjørnsen. He graduated with a candidate of law (cand.jur.) degree in 1926. During the Spanish Civil War he was stationed in Valencia (1937) and as chargé d'affaires ad interim in Barcelona (1938). During World War II he was stationed in Moscow from 1943. He served as Norwegian ambassador in Beijing from 1955, and was involved in the Indo-Norwegian Project in Kerala from 1959. He was ambassador to Mexico from 1961 to 1966. He was decorated Commander of the Order of St. Olav in 1956.

Diplomatic posts
Preceded by Nicolai Geelmuyden	Norwegian ambassador to China; 1955–1959	Succeeded by Erik Dons
