= Arne Arnesen =

Norwegian diplomat and politician

- In office 1982–1987
- Preceded by: Tancred Ibsen, Jr.
- Succeeded by: Jan Tore Holvik

Personal details
- Born: Moss, Norway
- Parents: Dordi Texnæs (father); Arne Arnesen (mother)
- Education: University of Oslo B.A. University of Minnesota M.A.
- Awards: Grand Cross of the Order of Prince Henry; Order of the Dannebrog; Commander of the Royal Norwegian Order of St. Olav

Arne Arnesen (15 February 1928 – 17 December 2010) was a Norwegian diplomat and politician for the Labour Party.

He was born in Moss as a son of dentist Arne Arnesen (1900–1975) and modist Dordi Texnæs (1906–1996). The family moved to Oslo in 1932. Arnesen finished his secondary education, lived in Hamar for some time before enrolling in political science at the University of Oslo in 1949. He studied at the University of Minnesota from 1951 until he graduated with the master's degree in 1953. He was a research fellow until 1955, when he started working for the Norwegian Ministry of Foreign Affairs.

He was stationed at the United Nations from 1957 to 1960, worked out of Norway with development aid until 1964, then two years at the embassy in Morocco. Back in Norway he was an assistant secretary in the Ministry of Foreign Affairs from 1966 to 1971, then leader of the minister's secretariat. After a short stint in the newspaper Arbeiderbladet in 1973 he served as State Secretary in the Ministry of Foreign Affairs from 1973 to 1975. He was then the director of the Norwegian Agency for Development Cooperation from 1975 to 1982, Norway's ambassador to China from 1982 to 1987, State Secretary in the Ministry of Development Cooperation from 1987 to 1989 and ambassador to Denmark from 1990 to 1996.

He was decorated with the Grand Cross of the Order of Prince Henry in 1976 and the Order of the Dannebrog, and was a Commander of the Royal Norwegian Order of St. Olav. He died in December 2010.

Civic offices
Preceded by Rudolf K. Andersen	Director of the Norwegian Agency for Development Cooperation; 1975–1982	Succeeded by Borger A. Lenth
Diplomatic posts
Preceded by Tancred Ibsen, Jr.	Norwegian ambassador to China; 1982–1987	Succeeded by Jan Tore Holvik
