= Helge Akre =

Norwegian diplomat

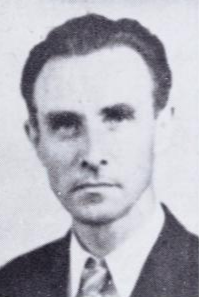
Helge Akre

Helge Akre (1 March 1903 – 12 May 1986) was a Norwegian diplomat.

He was a son of Herman Skyrud (1859–1913) and Oline Akre (1871–1967), and bore his mother's last name from 1933. He took his secondary education in Rouen and graduated from the Royal Frederick University with the cand.jur. degree in 1933. He worked as a translator and attorney before being hired in the Ministry of Foreign Affairs in 1936. He served in Brazil, Japan, China, Poland, the Soviet Union and Czechoslovakia in his early career. He was then the consul-general in Rotterdam from 1951 to 1958 and Chicago from 1958 to 1963. From 1963 he served as the Norwegian ambassador to the People's Republic of China. From 1967 he led the Norwegian embassy in Iceland.

He was decorated as a Knight First Class of the Order of St. Olav in 1956, Knight of the Order of Orange-Nassau and Officier d'Académie of France. He resided in Bærum.

Diplomatic posts
Preceded by Erik Dons	Norwegian ambassador to China; 1963–1967	Succeeded by Ole Ålgård
