= Svein Ole Sæther =

Norwegian diplomat

Svein Ole Sæther (born 26 July 1948) is a Norwegian diplomat.

He was born in Oslo, and is a cand.polit. by education. He started working for the Norwegian Ministry of Foreign Affairs in 1975. He was the Norwegian ambassador to Turkey from 1992 to 1997, and to Israel from 1997 to 2001. After a period as deputy under-secretary of state in the Ministry of Foreign Affairs from 2001 to 2007, he became the Norwegian ambassador to the People's Republic of China in 2007. Norway's ties to China were severely damaged following the Nobel Peace Prize to Liu Xiaobo, thus Norway chose not to rotate Sæther to another post, which would have been done after approximately five years. After ties were resumed in December 2016, Sæther was allowed to retire the following year.

Diplomatic posts
Preceded by Tor Christian Hildan	Norwegian ambassador to China; 2007–2017	Succeeded by Geir Otto Pedersen
