= Sverre Bergh Johansen =

Norwegian diplomat and ambassador

Sverre Bergh Johansen (16 October 1939 – 12 March 2017) was a Norwegian diplomat and ambassador.

He was a cand.jur. and mag.art. (PhD equivalent) by education and started working for the Norwegian Ministry of Foreign Affairs in 1967. He was a sub-director in the Norwegian Office of the Prime Minister from 1991 to 1994, served as the Norwegian ambassador to the People's Republic of China from 1994 to 1999, and to the United Nations in Geneva from 2001 to 2005.

Diplomatic posts
Preceded by Jan Tore Holvik	Norwegian ambassador to China; 1994–1999	Succeeded by Haakon Baardsøn Hjelde
