= Jack Foster (Australian footballer) =

Australian rules footballer (1912–1995)

Personal information
- Full name: Jack Foster
- Born: 30 November 1912
- Died: 31 January 1995 (aged 82)
- Original team: Sale
- Height: 183 cm (6 ft 0 in)
- Weight: 81 kg (179 lb)
- Position: Centre half-forward

Playing career^{1}
Years	Club	Games (Goals)
1935–38	Melbourne	27 (17)
- ^{1} Playing statistics correct to the end of 1938.

Jack Foster (30 November 1912 – 31 January 1995) was an Australian rules footballer who played with Melbourne in the Victorian Football League (VFL).
