= Les Handley =

Australian rules footballer, born 1918

Personal information
- Full name: Les Handley
- Born: 29 December 1918
- Died: 11 January 1995 (aged 76)
- Height: 177 cm (5 ft 10 in)
- Weight: 80 kg (176 lb)

Playing career^{1}
Years	Club	Games (Goals)
1942, 1945	St Kilda	12 (2)
- ^{1} Playing statistics correct to the end of 1945.

Les Handley (29 December 1918 – 11 January 1995) was an Australian rules footballer who played with St Kilda in the Victorian Football League (VFL).
