= John Dique =

John Charles Dique (5 August 1915 – 18 January 1995) was an Australian physician and right-wing political activist. He introduced haemodialysis to Australia with his construction of a dialysis machine based on Willem Kolff's design and later became a pathologist.

== Early life ==
John Dique was born in 1915 in Mandalay, Myanmar (now Burma), to John Stephen Dique and Norah Avice Georgiana (née Heyne); both parents were born in India and were of French and German heritage respectively. He was educated at a boarding school in Nainital, India, and later completed his medical studies in 1941 at the University of Madras. The same year, he married Doreen Bartley, a writer and artist, in Vepery.

== Career ==
Dique enrolled in the Indian Medical Service of the Indian Army in 1941 and was promoted to captain in 1943. He served in various posts across British India, at Rawalpindi, Poona, and the Burmese border. In 1948, he and his wife migrated to Australia with their five children, upset with the political unrest surrounding Indian and Pakistani independence. Due to the White Australia Policy, Dique and his wife had to provide genealogical evidence of their white ancestry in order to seek permission to migrate to Australia. They travelled on the SS Stratheden, and Dique visited major hospitals at each city the ship berthed in, seeking employment. Eventually he was hired at the Brisbane General Hospital, where he was appointed as a Transfusion and Resuscitation Officer. There, he improved the equipment used for administering blood transfusions and giving fluids through the umbilical veins of infants, and he was known for his skill in placing intravenous cannulas in patients with difficult-to-find veins.

Dique next turned his attention to constructing an apparatus to serve as an artificial kidney, following the description published by the Dutch haemodialysis pioneer Willem Kolff. In 1954, the first Australian patient to receive dialysis treatment did so with Dique's machine. He later constructed a second dialysis machine, a modification of Nils Alwall's design, and from 1954 to 1963 he and his colleagues treated eleven Australian patients with acute kidney failure; five survived and six died. In 1957, his three-year-old son died from chronic kidney failure caused by nephrotic syndrome. He later became a founding member of what is now the Royal College of Pathologists of Australasia and ran a private pathology practice until 1984.

== Activism ==
Dique became interested in social and political activism in the 1960s. He argued in favour of the White Australia Policy, warned of the "invasion" of Australia by non-European immigrants, and spoke of theories linking race and intelligence. In 1989, he was quoted in an article in The Bulletin as saying, "I am a racist. Everybody is racist. Everybody likes the company of people of his own kind." He was a member of the right-wing National Party of Australia, a member of the far-right Australian League of Rights organisation, and president of the Queensland Immigration Control Association.

== Death ==
Dique died in 1995 in Chermside, Queensland. His biography in the Australian Dictionary of Biography notes, "He left both a rich professional legacy and a reputation as an uncompromising racist."
