= Mildred Barry Hughes =

American politician

- Hughes circa 1957-1965
- Born: February 11, 1902; Elizabeth, New Jersey
- Died: January 11, 1995 (aged 92); Cranford, New Jersey
- Occupation: Senator
- Spouse: Peter L. Hughes II (m. 1902–1971)

Mildred Barry Hughes (February 11, 1902 – January 11, 1995) was an American Democratic Party politician who served in the New Jersey General Assembly and became the first woman elected to the New Jersey Senate in 1965.

== Politics ==
She was elected to the New Jersey General Assembly, as a Democrat, in 1957, 1959, 1961, and 1963. She became assistant majority leader in 1960 and 1961. When she won her Senate seat in 1965, she was the first Democrat from Union County, New Jersey, to be elected to the Senate in 75 years. She died on January 11, 1995, in Cranford, New Jersey.

She was known for sponsoring the following laws and acts:

- revision of the state's Food and Drug Act
- state's first "Good Samaritan" act to protect from lawsuits those who aided accident victims
- control billboards
- to aid nursing schools
- to assist mental health organizations
- a uniform Drinking Age of 21

== Personal life ==
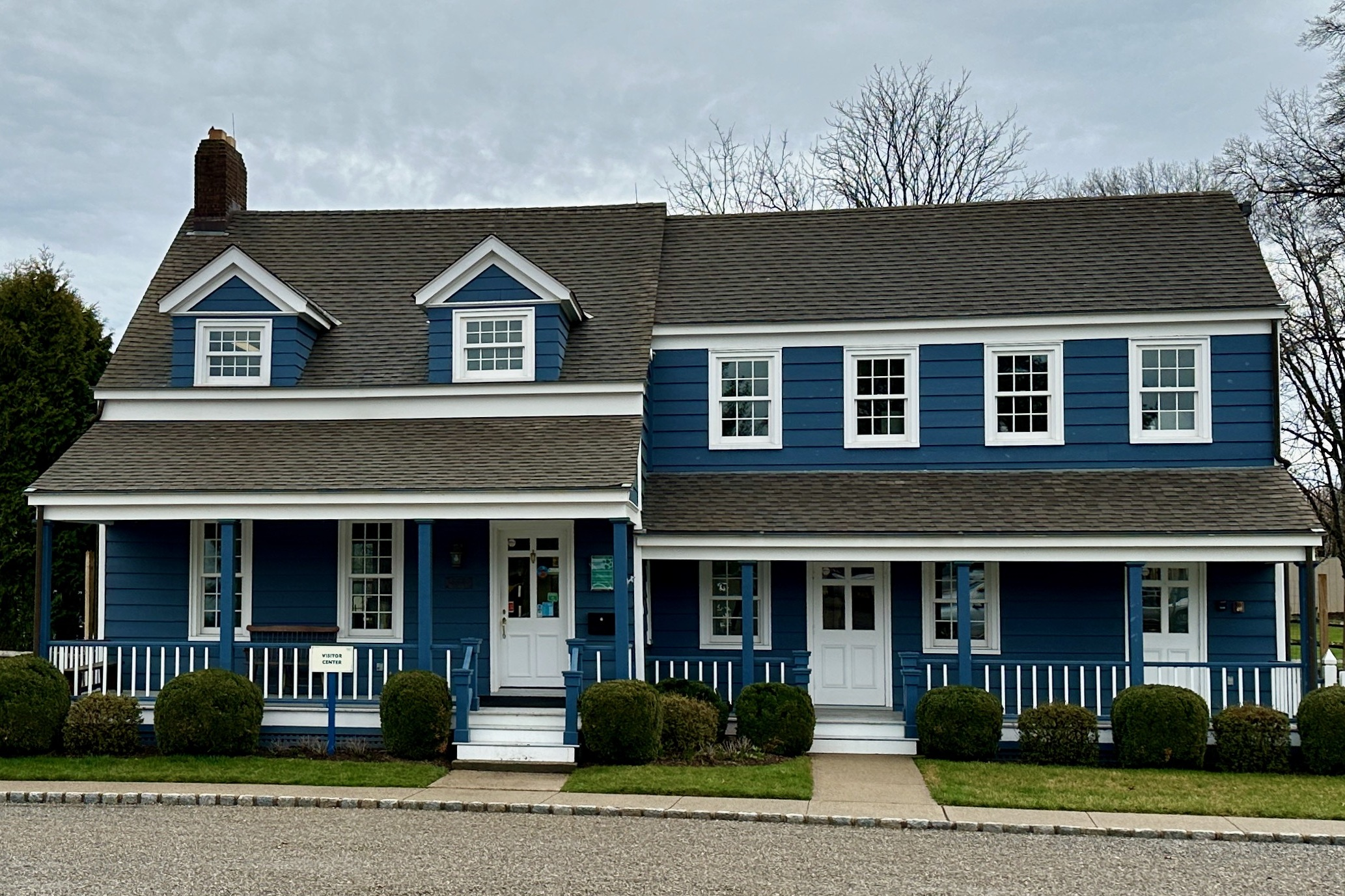
The Blue House, home of Mildred Barry Hughes, now at Liberty Hall

She was born as Mildred Barry in Elizabeth, New Jersey, and married Peter L. Hughes II (1902–1971) and had three children: Peter L. Hughes III, W. Barry Hughes, and David J. Hughes.
