= Gérard Simond =

French ice hockey player

Personal information
- Nationality: French
- Born: 11 May 1904; Chamonix, France
- Died: 9 January 1995 (aged 90); Sallanches, France

Sport
- Sport: Ice hockey

Gérard Andre Simond (11 May 1904 – 9 January 1995) was a French ice hockey player. He competed in the men's tournament at the 1928 Winter Olympics.
