= Tancred Ibsen Jr. =

Norwegian diplomat (1921–2015)

Tancred Ibsen Jr. (6 July 1921 – 11 February 2015) was a Norwegian diplomat.

He was born in Kristiania as a son of Tancred Ibsen and Lillebil Ibsen. He was the great-grandson of both playwright Henrik Ibsen and Nobel Prize laureate Bjørnstjerne Bjørnson. He had two daughters, Nora Ibsen and Hedda Ibsen.

He finished Oslo Commerce School in 1939 before taking the cand.oecon. degree in 1943 and the cand.jur. degree in 1946. He started working for the Norwegian Ministry of Foreign Affairs in 1947, and was promoted to assistant secretary in 1960. He held various positions between 1962 and 1968, before serving as the Norwegian ambassador to Hungary from 1968 to 1973, to Egypt from 1973 to 1979, to the People's Republic of China from 1979 to 1982, to India from 1982 to 1986 and to Greece from 1986 to 1989.

While serving in India he also covered Sri Lanka and the Maldives.

He was decorated as a Commander of the Order of St. Olav. After retiring he settled in Lillesand.

Diplomatic posts
Preceded by Torleif Anda	Norwegian ambassador to China; 1979–1982	Succeeded by Arne Arnesen
Preceded by	Norwegian ambassador to India; 1982–1986	Succeeded by Kåre Dæhlen
