= Tor Christian Hildan =

Norwegian diplomat

Tor Christian Hildan (born 10 June 1949) is a Norwegian diplomat.

He was born in Fredrikstad, and is a cand.polit. by education. He started working for the Norwegian Ministry of Foreign Affairs in 1976, and worked for the Norwegian Shipowners' Association from 1980 to 1983 and 1990 to 1993. He was a counsellor at the United Nations delegation in Geneva from 1995 to 1999, deputy under-secretary of state in the Ministry of Foreign Affairs from 1999 to 2003, and served as the Norwegian ambassador to the People's Republic of China from 2003 to 2007, then to South Africa from 2007.

Diplomatic posts
| Preceded by Haakon Baardsøn Hjelde | Norwegian ambassador to PR China; 2003–2007 | Succeeded by Svein Ole Sæther |
