= Dick Molloy =

Australian rules footballer, born 1918

Personal information
- Full name: Richard Vincent Molloy
- Born: 14 October 1918; Barellan, New South Wales
- Died: 29 January 1995 (aged 76)
- Original team: Sandhurst
- Height: 178 cm (5 ft 10 in)
- Weight: 76 kg (168 lb)

Playing career^{1}
Years	Club	Games (Goals)
1941	Essendon	2 (0)
1946–47	North Melbourne	19 (3)
Total		21 (3)
- ^{1} Playing statistics correct to the end of 1947.

Richard Vincent Molloy (14 October 1918 – 29 January 1995) was an Australian rules footballer who played with Essendon and North Melbourne in the Victorian Football League (VFL).

== Family ==
The son of Richard Vincent Molloy (1891–1946) and Margaret Teresa Molloy, nee Waide (1892–1929), Richard Vincent Molloy was born at Barellan in New South Wales on 14 October 1918.

== Football ==
Recruited from Sanhurst (Bendigo football League), Dick Molloy made two appearances for Essendon in the 1941 VFL season.

Between his stints with Essendon and North Melbourne, Molloy served in the Australian Army during World War II.
