= Neil McIntosh (paediatrician) =

Scottish paediatrician (born 1942)

Neil McIntosh (born 1942) is a British and Scottish paediatrician and neonatologist who was most notable for being the leading writer of a pivotal article that defined standards of ethical behaviour in paediatrics, including withdrawal of newborn intensive care. McIntosh is an emeritus professor of Neonatology and Child Life and Health at the University of Edinburgh. During McIntosh's career he researched mineral metabolism in preterm infants, computerised acquisition of physiological data in Neonatal Intensive Care Nursing.

== Life ==
McIntosh took his postgraduate clinical training in University College Hospital, London in 1968. Mcintosh was Senior Registrar in Paediatrics at University College Hospital, London, from 1972 to 1977. In 1978 McIntosh was appointed as a senior lecturer and consultant paediatric neonatologist at St George's Hospital, a position he held until 1987. In 1987 he was elected to the Edward Clarke Chair of Child Life and Health at the University of Edinburgh, a position McIntosh held until 2007.

== Bibliography ==
=== Articles ===
Some of the most important papers that McIntosh co-wrote:

- Best, Nicky; Ashby, Deborah; Dunstan, Frank; Foreman, David; McIntosh, Neil (January 2013). "A Bayesian approach to complex clinical diagnoses: a case-study in child abuse". Journal of the Royal Statistical Society, Series A (Statistics in Society). 176 (1): 53–96. doi:10.1111/j.1467-985X.2012.01050.x.
- McIntosh, N.; Pechtl, I.C.; Harris, C.L.; Kavanagh, D.; Barlow, P.N.B. (August 2011). "A mutant version of factor H that could block the activity of wild-type factor H – Implications for atypical haemolytic uraemic syndrome". Molecular Immunology. 48 (14): 1710. doi:10.1016/j.molimm.2011.06.360.
- Modi, Neena; McIntosh, Neil (June 2011). "The effect of the neonatal Continuous Negative Extrathoracic Pressure (CNEP) trial enquiries on research in the UK: Table 1". Archives of Disease in Childhood. 96 (6): 500–504. doi:10.1136/adc.2010.188243. PMID 21266336.
- Meulen, Marian Van Der; Logie, Robert H.; Freer, Yvonne; Sykes, Cindy; Mcintosh, Neil; Hunter, Jim (1 January 2010). "When a graph is poorer than 100 words: A comparison of computerised natural language generation, human generated descriptions and graphical displays in neonatal intensive care". Applied Cognitive Psychology. 24 (1): 77–89. doi:10.1002/acp.v24:1.
- Kidd, Susan; Midgley, Paula; Lone, Nazir; Michael Wallace, A.; Nicol, Mary; Smith, John; McIntosh, Neil (August 2009). "A re-investigation of saliva collection procedures that highlights the risk of potential positive interference in cortisol immunoassay". Steroids. 74 (8): 666–668. doi:10.1016/j.steroids.2009.02.009. PMID 19463688.
- Becher, J C (1 September 2004). "The Scottish perinatal neuropathology study: clinicopathological correlation in early neonatal deaths". Archives of Disease in Childhood: Fetal and Neonatal Edition. 89 (5): F399 – F407. doi:10.1136/adc.2003.037606. PMC 1721762. PMID 15321957.
- Becher, J-C (9 September 2005). "The distribution of apolipoprotein E alleles in Scottish perinatal deaths". Journal of Medical Genetics. 43 (5): 414–418. doi:10.1136/jmg.2005.033936. PMC 2564516. PMID 16183800.
- Boyle, E M; Freer, Y; Khan-Orakzai, Z; Watkinson, M; Wright, E; Ainsworth, J R; McIntosh, N (13 October 2005). "Sucrose and non-nutritive sucking for the relief of pain in screening for retinopathy of prematurity: a randomised controlled trial". Archives of Disease in Childhood: Fetal and Neonatal Edition. 91 (3): F166 – F168. doi:10.1136/adc.2005.087668. PMC 2672697. PMID 16428355.
- Boyle, Elaine M.; Freer, Yvonne; Wong, Mae C.; McIntosh, Neil; Anand, K. J.S. (September 2006). "Assessment of persistent pain or distress and adequacy of analgesia in preterm ventilated infants". Pain. 124 (1): 87–91. doi:10.1016/j.pain.2006.03.019.
- McIntosh, N.; Mok, J. Y.Q.; Margerison, A. (24 September 2007). "Epidemiology of Oronasal Hemorrhage in the First 2 Years of Life: Implications for Child Protection". Pediatrics. 120 (5): 1074–1078. doi:10.1542/peds.2007-2097. PMID 17893187.
- Williams, Christopher K. I.; Quinn, John; McIntosh, Neil (January 2005). "Factorial Switching Kalman Filters for Condition Monitoring in Neonatal Intensive Care" (PDF). Advances in Neural Information Processing Systems.

=== Books ===
In addition to collaborating in writing a large number of articles, McIntosh also wrote the following books:

- McIntosh, Neil (2006). Donn, Steven M.; Sinha, Sunil K. (eds.). Manual of neonatal respiratory care (3rd ed.). Springer. ISBN 978-0-323-03176-9.
