= Antony Warr =

England international rugby union player and cricketer

Antony 'Tim' Warr
- Born: Antony Lawley Warr; 15 May 1913 Selly Oak, Warwickshire, England
- Died: 29 January 1995 (aged 81) Taunton, Somerset, England

Rugby union career
- Position: Wing
Senior career
| Years | Team | Apps | (Points) |
- Old Leodiensians
| – | Wakefield | | |
| – | Yorkshire | | |
International career
| Years | Team | Apps | (Points) |
| 1934 | England | 2 | (3) |

Antony Lawley 'Tim' Warr (15 May 1913 – 29 January 1995) was an English rugby union player who represented the England national rugby union team. He also played first-class cricket with Oxford University.

Warr's two national caps came during the 1934 Home Nations Championship, where England claimed the triple crown. A winger, he scored a try on debut against Wales and made his other appearance against Ireland.

He played club rugby for Old Leodiensians before joining Wakefield during the 1936/37 season, scoring fourteen tries in twelve games in the two seasons he spent at the club. He also played seven times for Yorkshire and gained a blue for Oxford.

As a cricketer, Warr kept wicket for Oxford University in four first-class matches in 1933 and 1934. He spent some time playing with the Army during the 1940s and in 1950 he represented the Marylebone Cricket Club in a first-class match against Ireland in Dublin.

During the Second World War, he was the officer in charge of PT at Sandhurst

A school teacher by profession, he taught at Leeds Grammar School before teaching at Harrow School for over thirty years where he designed the Harrow first XV pitch.
