= Ross Fielder =

Australian rugby league footballer

Personal information
- Full name: Samuel Ross Mursell Fielder
- Born: 7 January 1926; Hurstville, New South Wales, Australia
- Died: 24 January 1995 (aged 69); Sylvania Waters, New South Wales, Australia

Playing information
- Position: Prop, Second-row
Club
Years	Team	Pld	T	G	FG	P
1948–51	St. George	39	7	0	0	21
- Source: As of 29 July 2019

Samuel Ross Mursell Fielder (7 January 1926 – 24 January 1995) was an Australian rugby league footballer who played in the 1940s and 1950s.

After returning from war service with the RAAF, Fielder joined the St. George club via the Bexley junior club in 1948. He played front row and second row during his grade career at Saints, often coming up from Reserve Grade whenever injuries occurred to the first grade team. Ross Fielder retired after the 1951 NSWRFL season.

Fielder died on 24 January 1995 at Sylvania Waters, New South Wales aged 69.
