= Vinderen =

Neighbourhood in Vestre Aker, Oslo, Norway

Coordinates: 59°56′33″N 10°42′15″E

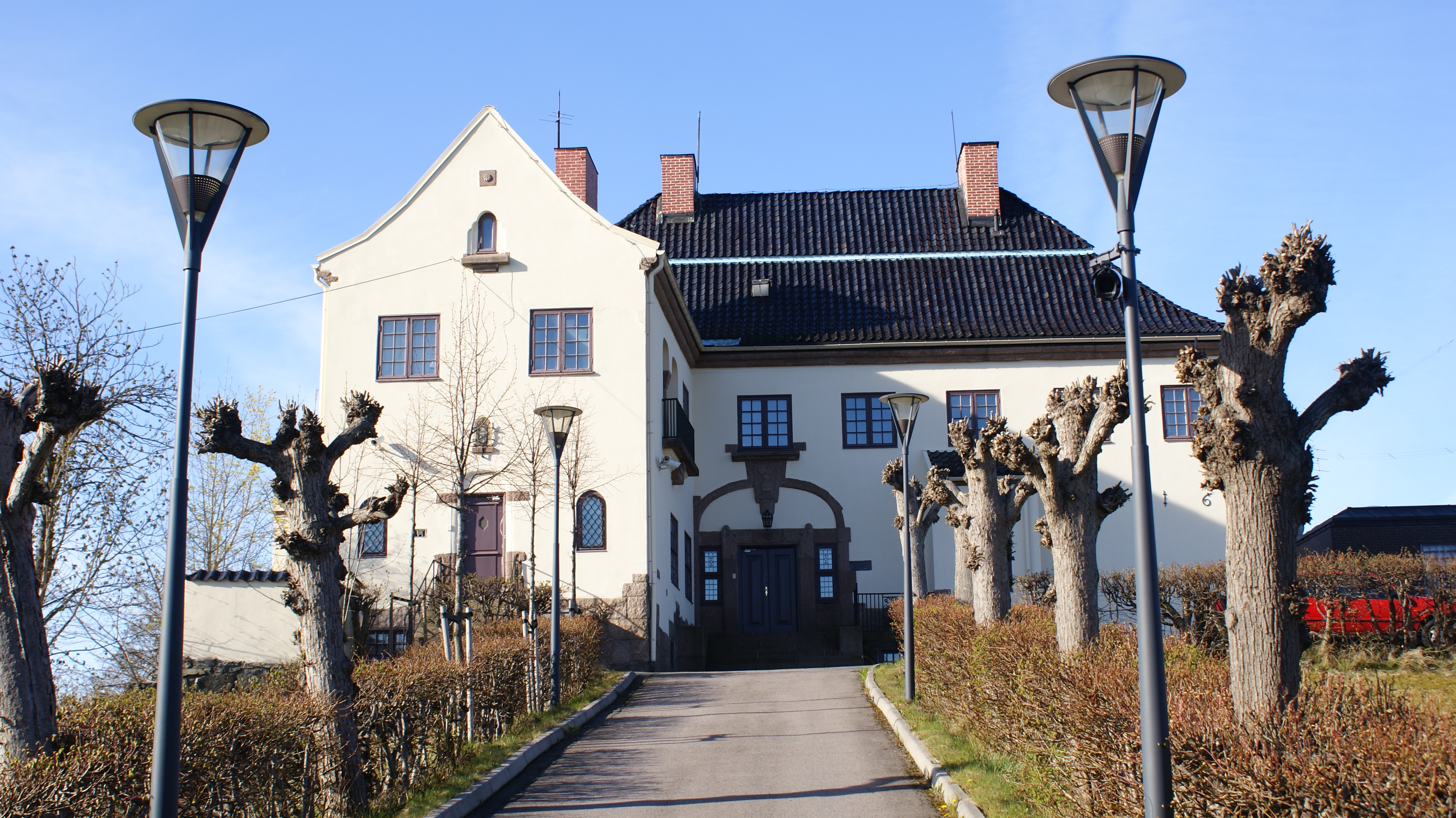
The embassy of China in Norway is located in the heart of Vinderen.

Vinderen is a neighbourhood in the Vestre Aker borough of Oslo, Norway. It was a separate borough until 1 January 2004, when it was incorporated into the newly established borough of Vestre Aker.

Its amenities include Vinderen station.

The prosperous avenue of Tuengen Allé in Vinderen was the childhood home of Queen Sonja of Norway at 1B; and the current embassy of China in Norway at 2B. In 2015, the Queens childhood home was moved to Maihaugen in Lillehammer.

10C Tuengen Alle is the functionalist Villa Stenersen, designed by architect Arne Korsmo and was built from 1937 to 1939 for the financier, art collector, and author Rolf Stenersen and his family. Stenerson bequeathed the Villa Stenersen to the State of Norway as a home for the Prime Minister. Odvar Nordli lived in the house, but the building has since been used for cultural purposes.
