= Gabriel Ålgård =

Norwegian politician

Gabriel Ålgård (5 October 1952 – 14 July 2015) was a Norwegian politician for the Conservative Party.

He served as a deputy representative to the Parliament of Norway from Rogaland during the term 1977–1981. In total he met during 76 days of parliamentary session.
