= Erich Hauert =

Swiss serial killer and sex offender (born 1959)

- Born: 1959 (age 66–67); Switzerland
- Conviction: Murder
- Penalty: Life imprisonment

Details
- Victims: 3
- Span of crimes: 1982–1993
- Country: Switzerland
- States: Zürich, Aargau
- Date apprehended: November 1, 1993

Erich Hauert (born 1959) is a Swiss serial killer and sex offender. He was sentenced to life imprisonment for three murders, and his case had a significant impact on the treatment of dangerous sexual offenders and their legal provisions in Switzerland.

== Murder of Pasquale Brumann ==
On the afternoon of 30 October 1993, after a one-day operation on the Zollikerberg near Zürich, the body of the missing 20-year-old boy scout leader Pasquale Brumann was found. She had been stabbed in the neck and buried naked in the forest.

== The perpetrator ==
As early as 1 November 1993, Hauert, who was convicted of eleven rapes and two sexually charged murders, was arrested and later confessed to the crime. DNA analysis also provided further evidence to this. The detainee at the Regensdorf Detention Center had committed the crime while out on parole.

Earlier, Hauert had raped and murdered a 26-year-old jogger in Thalwil near Lake Zürich in 1982, and a 72-year-old woman in Kaiseraugst a year later. After he was arrested in June 1983 after an attempted robbery, he was proven guilty, classified as "extremely dangerous" and sentenced to life imprisonment.

In all the years he spent in prison Hauert's sentence had been loosened successively, as he behaved harmlessly and was given a few holiday leaves to no complaints. On 29 October 1993, the Zürich Department of Justice approved another short leave for Hauert, and just a day later, he killed Brumann.

== Aftermath ==
=== Trial ===
In September 1996, Hauert was again sentenced to life imprisonment and reprimanded of parole.

The mother of the murdered, Jeannette Brumann, filed a state liability suit against the canton, reaching up to the Federal Supreme Court. The canton denied any responsibility, but recognized in April 1997 the family's claims for "moral reasons". In 1998, it finally came to a comprehensive comparison. The canton of Zürich paid against the renunciation of the family to further civil claims about one million francs.

The trial against the four judicial staff involved in granting Hauert parole resulted in acquittals, and they received five-digit process compensations.

=== Impact on the prison system ===
After the murder, the leave and discharge guidelines were tightened and the custody increased massively, reducing the number of relapses.

=== Legislation ===
In response to the Brumann murder and another sex offence committed by another repeat offender, a popular initiative "Lifelong custody for unreachable, extremely dangerous sexual and violent offenders" was launched. This was submitted on 3 May 2000, with 194 390 valid signatures. On 8 February 2004, the initiative had the popular majority of 56.2 per cent and the cantons of 21.5 accepted Act 123a in the Swiss Federal Constitution.

Therefore, sex offenders and violent offenders classified as extremely dangerous and untreatable in the forensic reports prepared for trials must be jailed until the end of their lives and are excluded from parole and early release. New reports may only be prepared when new scientific evidence has proven that the custodian can be cured. All reports must be prepared by at least two independent and experienced professionals. If, on the basis of these new opinions, an offender is released from custody, the competent authority must take responsibility if the person dismissed relapses.

=== Criticism of the Judiciary ===
The judiciary as the director of the Zürich Conseil d'État at the time of cantonal corrections charge, later Swiss Federal Councilor, Moritz Leuenberger, was made politically responsible for the death of Pasquale Brumann. He had been repeatedly informed by the competent state's attorney Pius Schmid on Hauert's dangerousness but did not take the appropriate measures. In the report on the question of granting parole for Erich Hauert he had been warned that Hauert suffered from "psychopathic disturbances of the character structure".

== Press articles ==
- Peter Holenstein: "One word could have been enough" (Weltwoche, 14 January 2004, Issue 3/04) – Interview with the mother of the victim
- Alex Baur: The Brumann case - corpse in the cellar (Weltwoche, 5 September 2007, Issue 36/07) – Report on the details and consequences of the crime as well as failures of the Judicial Directorate

== See also ==
- List of serial killers by country
