= Sylvia B. Seaman =

American novelist (1900–1995)

Syliva Bernstein Seaman
- Born: November 8, 1900; Manhattan, New York
- Died: January 8, 1995 (aged 94)
- Other names: Francis Sylvin
- Years active: 1915–1995
- Notable work: Rusty Carrousel, Miracle Father, Always a Woman: What Every Woman Should Know About Breast Cancer, How to Be a Jewish Grandmother

Sylvia B. Seaman was an American women's suffrage activist who worked to promote public awareness of breast cancer and women's health. In 1995 Seaman died of breast cancer, however, her legacy lies within her novels, and efforts to increase public awareness of breast cancer and women's health.

== Early life ==
Sylvia B. Seaman, originally known as Sylvia Bernstein, was born in Manhattan on November 8, 1900. In 1915 Seaman marched in her first women's suffrage march, prompting heavy participation in women's activism from her teenage years forward.

Soon after becoming involved in the women's rights movement, Seaman was arrested for wearing riding breeches in public. This act was seen as "unbecoming" of a lady and was not tolerated at this point in the twentieth century. Seaman was attending Cornell University when the 20th Amendment passed, where she gained the qualifications to teach High School English, which she did for several years following graduation. Also around that time she married William Seaman. She went on to write articles for magazines and newspapers with her roommate, Frances Schwartz, under the pseudonym of Francis Sylvin. Seaman published under a male alias in order for her works to be taken more seriously.

== Literary career ==
Outside of the articles they wrote together, Seaman and Schwartz wrote two novels under the name Francis Sylvin, their 1943 novel Rusty Carrousel and their 1952 novel Miracle Father.

Rusty Carousel told the story of Stephanie Camill, a Cornell graduate working half-heartedly as a public school teacher. She craves love and marriage and the novel tells the story of her jumping from relationship to relationship unable to find a husband. With both Seaman and Schwartz being ex-school teachers themselves, the novel was able to give people a comprehensive view of what the New York City public school system was like. It shows how a teacher can be moved from school to school, and what hardships the system can place on a teacher.

In 1955, Sylvia Seaman wrote a novel titled, Glorious to View with her lifelong friend, Francis Wexler Schwartz that detailed their time as students at Cornell University from 1918 to 1922. Seaman used the novel as an outlet to share her experiences as a woman on a predominantly male campus, and the challenges she faced as a result. Her unique ability to speak to women in a similar situation forged the way for other women to attend higher education and have their voices heard. Sylvia remained connected to Cornell University throughout her life, even serving as the class correspondent for more than 50 years. This novel remains in manuscript form in the archives at Cornell University.

Their 1952 novel Miracle Father told the story of a couple conceiving a child through artificial insemination. When the novel was republished in 1968, it was retitled as Test-Tube Father.

== Activism ==
In 1955 Seaman underwent a radical mastectomy due to a mass found in her breast. This milestone in her life turned her to a path of education and awareness about breast cancer and its severity. In 1965, Seaman published a controversial novel called What Every Woman Should Know About Breast Cancer, in which she explains ways of how a radical mastectomy could be avoided. Seaman then devoted herself to educating other women on the importance of self-checks and mammograms for the rest of her career. In an interview with Irene Davall, a prominent feminist leader in the 1970s, Seaman stated, "It may be in time that they don't have to do many radicals, especially if mammograms should become more popular." Ultimately, she believed strongly in women's activism and educating the public on women's health issues that were rarely talked about at the time.

In addition to continuing to tell her story and educate the public about breast cancer, Seaman spoke out about several other controversial issues within the realm of women's health and sexuality. Often she spoke out about abortion and its importance, along with lesbianism and other sexual orientations that were highly avoided within the media. Seaman continued to interview on radio shows and for newspapers until she was in her late seventies, and continued to write articles in newspapers about newly controversial topics that came up within the women's rights movement.

How to be a Jewish Grandmother was the last novel written by Seaman and was published in 1979. Meant to be lighter and more humorous, the novel was a collection of anecdotes and advice that described what it meant to be a woman, to be Jewish, and to be a grandmother with every topic being fair game for discussion. The topics ranged from her drinking habits, to daughter-in-laws, and even to vasectomies. It expressed the shift that America had undergone in her lifetime, how it was still changing and how bewildered she was by those changes.

== Family ==
Seaman's daughter-in-law Barbara Seaman was also influential in the women's health movement, and was the one who convinced Sylvia Seaman to write on her experience of having a mastectomy. Her son Gideon also worked with Barbara to write Women and the Crisis in Sex Hormones, which was one of the first books to examine the dangers of hormonal contraceptives for women and to discuss alternatives to hormonal contraceptives, as well as menopause and how hormones relate to it.
