= Gabriel Aalgaard =

Norwegian agriculturalist and politician (1881–1973)

- Born: September 9, 1881; Ålgård, Gjæsdal Municipality, Rogaland, Norway
- Died: 1973 (aged 91–92)
- Spouse: Berta Serine Egeland (m. 1920)
- Children: Ole Ålgård
- Parents: Ole Aalgaard (father); Martha Ueland (mother)

Gabriel Aalgaard (9 September 1881 – 1973) was a Norwegian agriculturalist and politician.

He was born in Ålgård as a son of petty officer and farmer Ole Aalgaard (1848–1936) and Martha Ueland (1859–1915). He took petty officer training himself, graduating from officer school in 1903. He was a farmer from 1918, and in the military he reached the rank of Lieutenant in 1930. He was best known as the chairman of Norske Eggcentraler from 1929 to 1952 and board member of the Norwegian Poultry Association from 1926 to 1933. He was the deputy mayor of Gjesdal Municipality from 1926 to 1931, and was later a municipal council member from 1935 to 1946.

Together with Berta Serine Egeland (1895–1983), whom he married in 1920, he had one son, diplomat Ole Ålgård, which both share the same birthday.
