= Haakon Baardsøn Hjelde =

Norwegian diplomat

Haakon Baardsøn Hjelde (born 7 December 1941) is a Norwegian diplomat.

He was born in Oslo, and is a cand.jur. by education. He started working for the Norwegian Ministry of Foreign Affairs in 1965. After a period as deputy under-secretary of state in the Ministry of Foreign Affairs from 1994 to 1999, he became the Norwegian ambassador to the People's Republic of China in 1999. He was then ambassador to Finland from 2003 to 2007. In 2000 he was decorated as a Commander of the Royal Norwegian Order of Merit.

Diplomatic posts
Preceded by Sverre Bergh Johansen	Norwegian ambassador to PR China; 1999–2003	Succeeded by Tor Christian Hildan
