= Ralph W. Nicholson =

- Born: 1916; Chicago, Illoinis, U.S.
- Died: January 1, 1995 (aged 78–79); Marshall, Virginia
- Education: University of Chicago
- Employer(s): United States Postal Service (USPS); Corporation for Public Broadcasting; Conrail

Ralph W. Nicholson (1916 – January 1, 1995) was an American civil servant, military officer, and business executive. He is best remembered for being the chief financial officer of the United States Postal Service (USPS) while senior assistant postmaster general of the United States from 1972 to 1975. He had previously served as the USPS's Assistant United States Postmaster General for installations and logistics during the 1960s. In 1964 he was given the Benjamin Franklin Award; the highest honor awarded by the USPS. During his career he also served terms as vice president and Treasurer of the Corporation for Public Broadcasting and CEO of Conrail.

== Life and career ==
Born in Chicago, Nicholson graduated from the University of Chicago and began his professional career at that institution in the university's public relations office. He then worked as an advertising executive for General Electric before enlisting in the United States Marine Corps in 1941. He worked as an instructor in anti-aircraft artillery at Quantico and as an Assistant Operations Officer under William J. Wallace at Pearl Harbor and in the Pacific theater during World War II; earning the commissioned rank of major. He was cited for outstanding service during the Battle of Okinawa in 1945.

Nicholson completed his military service in 1946, after which he became an advertising executive with Fuller & Smith & Ross, Inc. in New York City; eventually becoming vice president and Manager of the company. In 1960 he entered government service as a senior postal executive for the United States Postal Service during the John F. Kennedy and Lyndon B. Johnson administrations; serving terms as Assistant United States Postmaster General for installations and logistics (1960-1969) and Senior Assistant United States Postmaster General over finance (1972-1975). From 1969 to 1972 he was vice president and Treasurer of the Corporation for Public Broadcasting. From 1976 to 1981 he was the chief executive officer of Conrail.

Nicholson died in Marshall, Virginia on January 1, 1995. He was married to Rosemary Kleutgen Nichols for 52 years.
