= Charles Hauert =

Swiss fencer

Personal information
- Born: 26 April 1908
- Died: 19 January 1995 (aged 86)

Sport
- Sport: Fencing

Charles Hauert (26 April 1908 – 19 January 1995) was a Swiss fencer. He competed in the team épée event at the 1936 Summer Olympics.
