= Ole Ålgård =

Norwegian diplomat

- Ålgård in 1979
- Born: September 9, 1921; Gjestal Municipality, Rogaland, Norway
- Died: January 26, 1995 (aged 73); Våler, Østfold, Norway
- Spouse: Rigmor Braathe (m. 1947)
- Parents: Gabriel Aalgaard (father); Berta Serine Egeland (mother)

Ole Ålgård (9 September 1921 – 26 January 1995) was a Norwegian diplomat.

== Early life ==
He was born in Gjestal Municipality as a son of farmer and petty officer Gabriel Aalgaard (1881–1973), and Berta Serine Egeland (1895–1983). He finished his secondary education at Stavanger Cathedral School in and graduated with the cand.jur. degree from the University of Oslo in 1946. He chaired Sosialistisk studentlag in 1946, and was hired as a secretary in the Ministry of Foreign Affairs in the same year. He worked two years in Moscow before returning to Norway in 1950. In November 1947 he married Rigmor Braathe.

== Later career ==
From 1951 to 1956, he was a legation secretary in Vienna, changing to chargé d'affaires as Norway got an embassy in the country. He mainly worked in Norway from 1956 to 1961, as an embassy counsellor at the Norwegian United Nations embassy from 1961 to 1964, and as embassy counsellor in the Council of Europe from 1965 to 1967.

He was Norway's ambassador to the People's Republic of China from 1967 to 1971 and to the United Nations from 1971 to 1982. He was the President of the United Nations Security Council in April 1979 and June 1980. He was the ambassador to Denmark from 1982 to 1989. He chaired the Norwegian Atlantic Committee. He settled at his wife's family farm in Våler Municipality in Østfold county in 1989, where he died in January 1995.

He was decorated as a Commander of the Order of St. Olav in 1978, and held the Grand Cross of the Order of the Dannebrog. He was a Knight of the Belgian Order of Leopold and the Order of the Lion of Finland, and held the Austrian Order of Merit.

Diplomatic posts
Preceded by Helge Akre	Norwegian ambassador to China; 1967–1971	Succeeded by Monrad Helle
Preceded by Edvard Hambro	Permanent Representative of Norway to the United Nations; 1971–1982	Succeeded by Tom Vraalsen
Preceded by Leslie O. Harriman	President of the United Nations Security Council; April 1979	Succeeded by Vasco Futscher Pereira
Preceded by Ide Oumarou	President of the United Nations Security Council; June 1980	Succeeded by Carlos P. Romulo
