= Neil McIntosh (footballer) =

Australian rules footballer

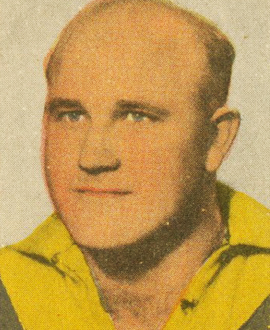

Personal information
- Full name: Neil McIntosh
- Born: 15 October 1920
- Died: 18 January 1995 (aged 74)
- Original team: Northcote
- Height: 183 cm (6 ft 0 in)
- Weight: 97 kg (214 lb)

Playing career^{1}
| Years | Club | Games (Goals) |
| 1942–44 | Collingwood | 21 (10) |
- ^{1} Playing statistics correct to the end of 1944.

Neil McIntosh (15 October 1920 – 18 January 1995) was an Australian rules footballer who played with Collingwood in the Victorian Football League (VFL).
