= Vestre Aker =

Borough of Oslo, Norway

Bydel Vestre Aker
- Borough
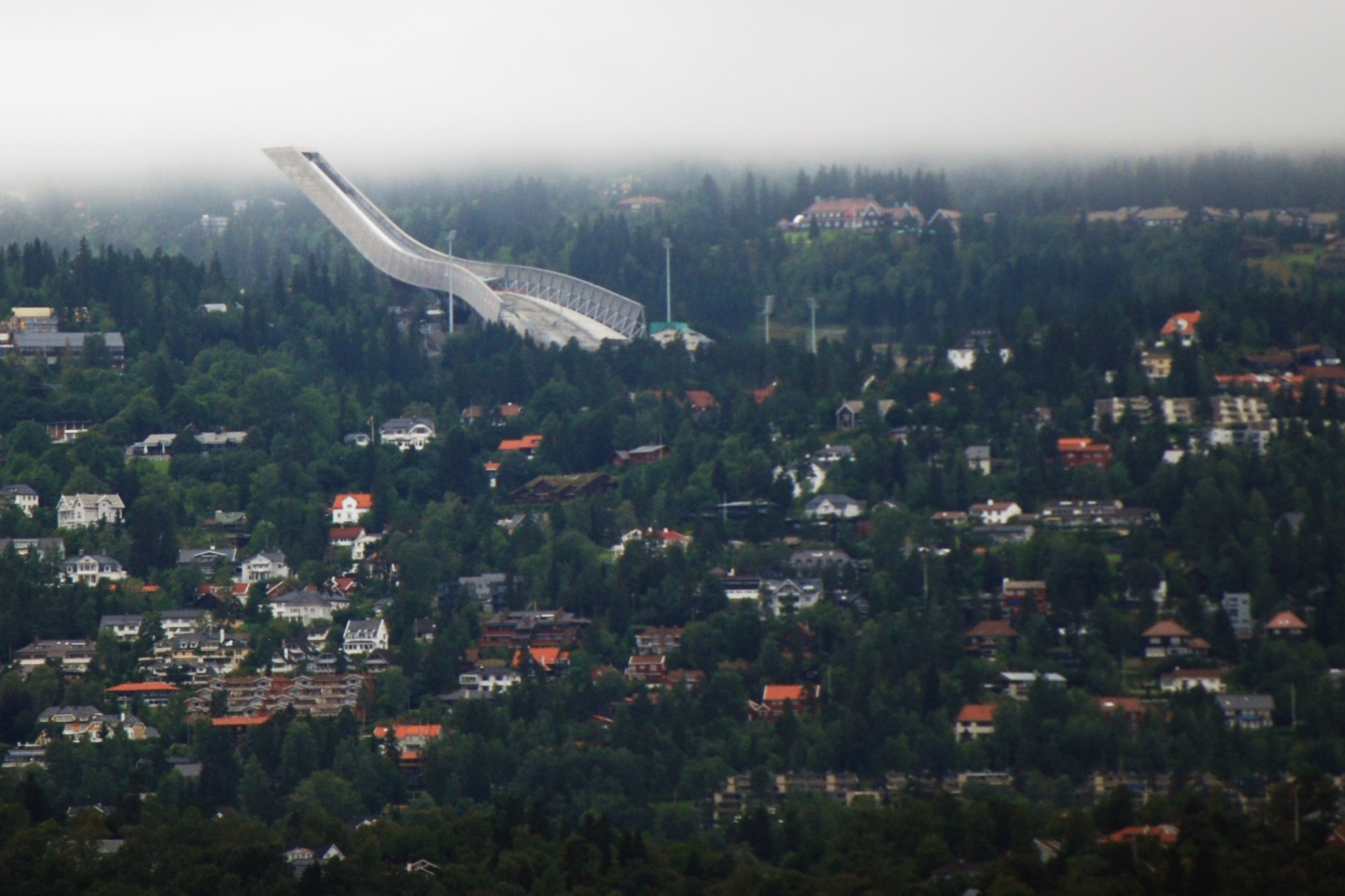

- Coat of arms

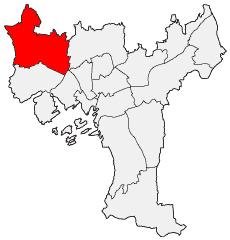
- Coordinates: 59°56′15″N 10°43′38″E
- Country: Norway
- City: Oslo

Area
  - Total: 16.59 km^{2} (6.41 sq mi)

Population (2020)
  - Total: 50,157
  - Density: 3,023/km^{2} (7,830/sq mi)
- Time zone: UTC+1 (CET)
  - Summer (DST): UTC+2 (CEST)
- ISO 3166 code: NO-030107
- Website: bydel-vestre-aker.oslo.kommune.no

Vestre Aker (Western Aker) is a borough of the city of Oslo, Norway. It has a population of 50,157 as of 2020.

The previous Aker Municipality was merged into the city of Oslo in 1948.

The borough of Vestre Aker was organized as part of the 1 January 2004 reform. Previous boroughs Vinderen and Røa became part of the new borough of Vestre Aker. The borough of Vestre Aker does not correspond to Vestre Aker parish of the Church of Norway, that lies east of the borough. The borough of Vestre Aker belongs to Ris, Røa and Voksen parishes of the Church of Norway.

Situated in the hillside west of the city centre, Vestre Aker is known for being one of the wealthiest parts of Oslo.

Ready started playing in the Norwegian Bandy Premier League 2004–05 and has ever since.

The borough consists of the following traditional districts of Oslo:

- Holmenkollen, the location of the Holmenkollen ski jump
- Tryvann
- Vinderen
- Røa
- Sørkedalen
- Smestad, Oslo
- Slemdal

== Politics ==
As a borough of Oslo, Vestre Aker is governed by the city council of Oslo as well as its own borough council. The council leader is Yngvar Husebye from the Conservative Party and the deputy leader is Bård Thorheim, also of the Conservative Party. The Conservative Party has the most seats. The 15 seats are distributed among the following political parties for the 2019-2023 term:

- 8 from the Conservative Party (Høyre)
- 2 from the Labour Party (Arbeiderpartiet)
- 2 from the Green Party (Miljøpartiet de Grønne)
- 1 from the Progress Party (Fremskrittspartiet)
- 1 from the Socialist Left Party (Sosialistisk Venstreparti)
- 1 from the Liberal Party (Venstre)

== Culture ==
The mausoleum of Emanuel Vigeland is located at Slemdal. Vigeland called it Tomba Emmanuelle.

== Notable people ==
- Dagmar Karin Sørbøe, physiotherapist and women's rights activist
