= Vettakollen (station) =

Oslo metro station

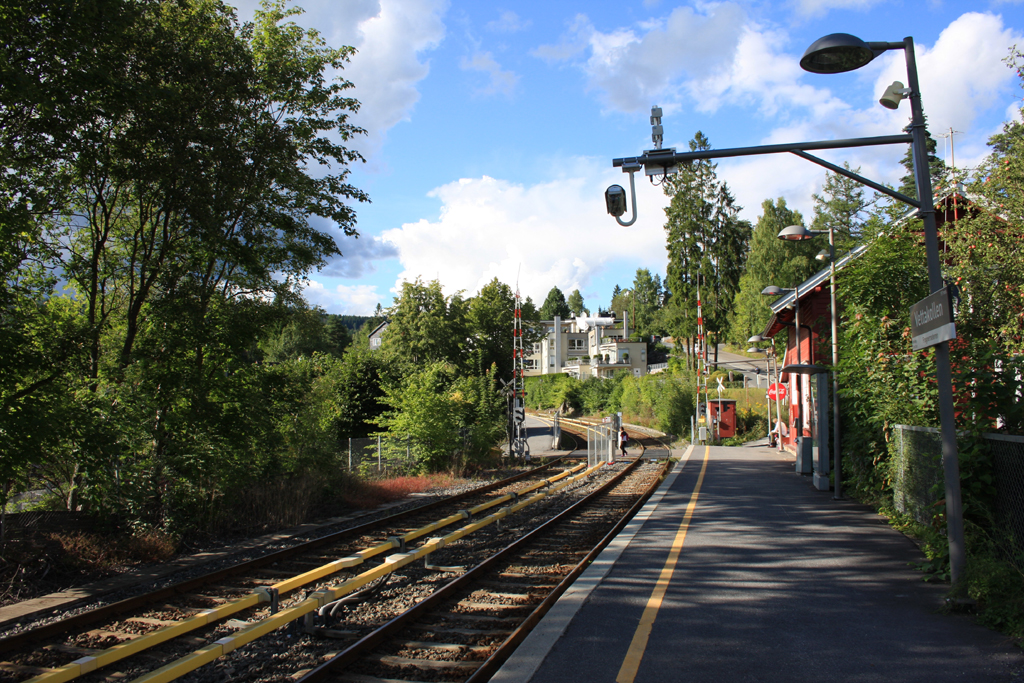

General information
- Location: Vettakollen, Vestre Aker, Oslo; Norway
- Coordinates: 59°57′36″N 10°41′43″E
- Elevation: 196.7 m (645 ft)
- Owner: Sporveien
- Operator: Sporveien T-banen
- Line: Holmenkollen Line
- Distance: 7.5 km (4.7 mi) from Stortinget

Construction
- Structure type: At-grade
- Accessible: Yes

History
- Opened: 31 May 1898
Location

Vettakollen is a station on the Holmenkollen Line (line 1) of the Oslo Metro. It is located between Skådalen and Gulleråsen. The station was opened on 31 May 1898 as part of the light rail to Holmenkollen. The station was originally opened as Greveveien, but changed its name a few months after the opening.

Preceding station	Oslo Metro	Following station
Skådalen towards Frognerseteren	Line 1	Gråkammen towards Bergkrystallen
