= Gulleråsen (station) =

Oslo metro station

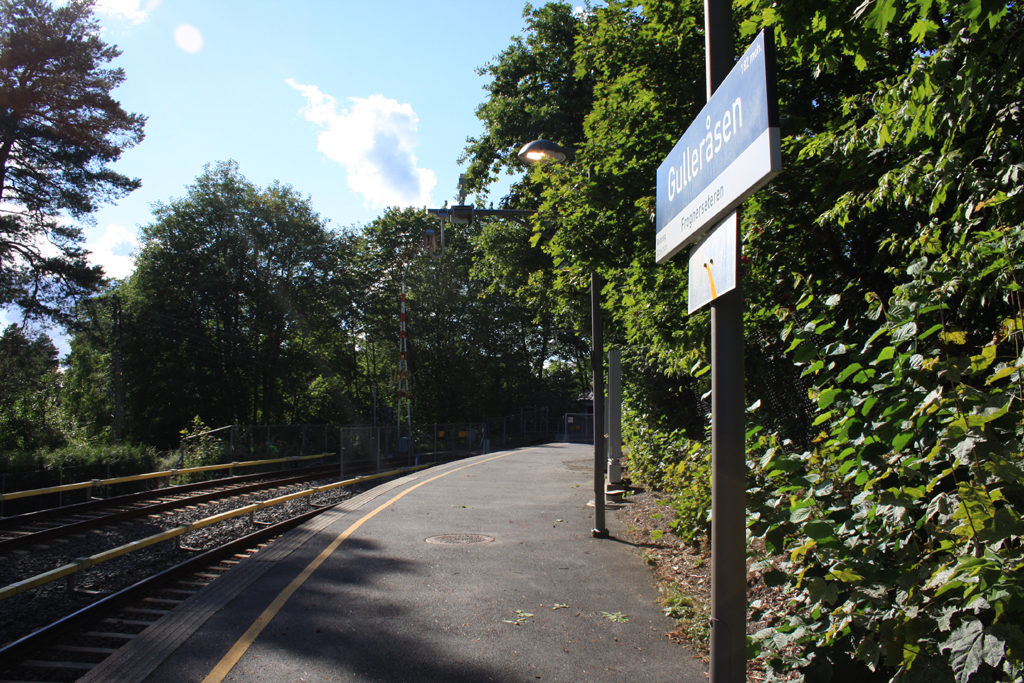

General information
- Location: Vestre Aker, Oslo; Norway
- Coordinates: 59°57′22″N 10°41′47″E
- Elevation: 181.4 m (595 ft)
- Owner: Sporveien
- Operator: Sporveien T-banen
- Line: Holmenkollen Line
- Distance: 7.0 km (4.3 mi) from Stortinget

Construction
- Structure type: At-grade
- Accessible: Yes

History
- Opened: 31 May 1898
Location

Gulleråsen is a station on the Holmenkollen Line (Line 1) of the Oslo Metro. It is between Vettakollen and Gråkammen. The station was opened on 31 May 1898 as part of the tramway to Besserud.

Gulleråsen lies in a tight 80 m radius curve, and there was a snag when the line was upgraded to handle MX3000 trains. When the line was tested with the new stock, it was found that the gap between the inbound platform edge and train door was 54 cm, this is unacceptably wide for safety reasons. As a result, the station is only served by outbound trains. From 12 January 2011, a replacement bus between Gulleråsen and Slemdal 750 metres away was implemented following pressure from residents. The bus has been criticized for low passenger numbers and each passenger is subsidized with about NOK 300. A possible resolution is to only open the last door in the trainset, but this requires modifications to the MX3000.

Preceding station	Oslo Metro	Following station
Vettakollen towards Frognerseteren	Line 1	Gråkammen towards Bergkrystallen
