= Lillevann (station) =

Oslo metro station

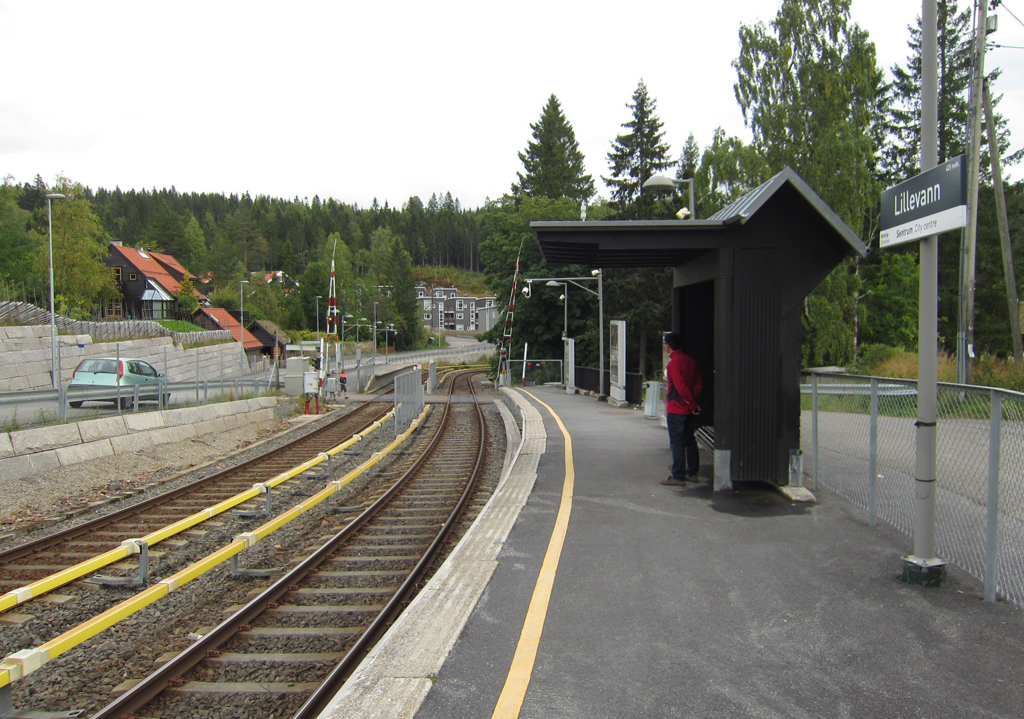

General information
- Location: Vestre Aker, Oslo; Norway
- Coordinates: 59°58′50″N 10°39′10″E
- Elevation: 425.0 m (1,394.4 ft)
- Owner: Sporveien
- Operator: Sporveien T-banen
- Line: Holmenkollen Line
- Distance: 12.7 km (7.9 mi) from Stortinget

Construction
- Structure type: At-grade
- Accessible: Yes

History
- Opened: 16 May 1916
Location

Lillevann is a station on the Holmenkollen Line (Line 1) on the Oslo Metro. The station is located between Skogen and Voksenkollen, at an altitude of 425 m (1,394 ft) above mean sea level. The station was opened on 16 May 1916 with the extension of the line from Besserud, but the station building is older. That building was built in 1898 on an estate at Besserud, but then moved to Lillevann. The architect was Paul Due.

Lillevann can claim at least two superlatives. The station is the least-used on the entire metro system, with only 49 passengers embarking and disembarking per day in 2003. Lillevann is also the system's northernmost station; after Lillevann the line turns from its general direction of northwest and heads eastwards, and the last two stations, Voksenkollen and Frognerseteren, lie marginally further south.

Lillevann means "little pond" in Norwegian and refers to a small lake to the east of the station. The neighborhood around the station consists of detached houses. In addition some paths fit for hikers go past the station and there is a small hotel and conference centre to the north of the station.

Preceding station	Oslo Metro	Following station
Voksenkollen towards Frognerseteren	Line 1	Skogen towards Bergkrystallen
