= Skådalen (station) =

Oslo metro station

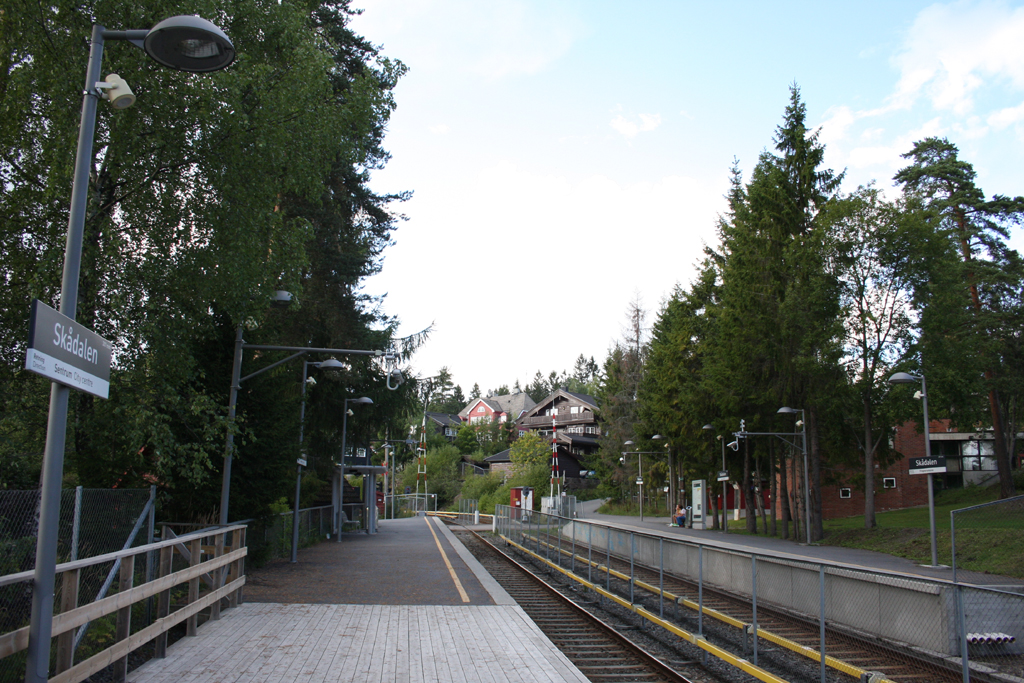

General information
- Location: Vestre Aker, Oslo; Norway
- Coordinates: 59°57′42″N 10°41′24″E
- Elevation: 181.4 m (595 ft)
- Owner: Sporveien
- Operator: Sporveien T-banen
- Line: Holmenkollen Line
- Distance: 7.9 km (4.9 mi) from Stortinget

Construction
- Structure type: At-grade
- Accessible: Yes

History
- Opened: 31 May 1898
Location

Skådalen is a station on the Holmenkollen Line (Line 1) of the Oslo Metro. It is between Midtstuen and Vettakollen. The station was opened on 31 May 1898 as part of the tramway to Besserud.

Preceding station	Oslo Metro	Following station
Midtstuen towards Frognerseteren	Line 1	Vettakollen towards Bergkrystallen
