= Voksenlia (station) =

Oslo metro station

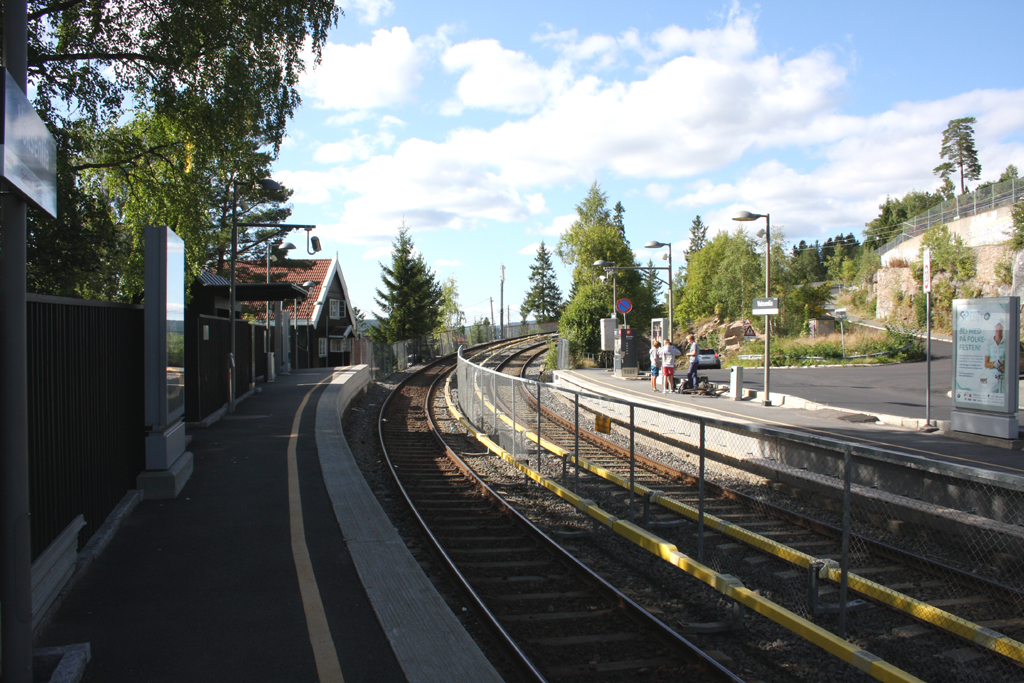

General information
- Location: Vestre Aker, Oslo; Norway
- Coordinates: 59°58′0″N 10°39′18″E
- Elevation: 330.5 m (1,084 ft)
- Owner: Sporveien
- Operator: Sporveien T-banen
- Line: Holmenkollen Line
- Distance: 10.8 km (6.7 mi) from Stortinget

Construction
- Structure type: At-grade
- Accessible: Yes

History
- Opened: 16 May 1916
Location

Voksenlia is a station on the Holmenkollen Line (Line 1) of the Oslo Metro. It is between Skogen and Holmenkollen. The station was opened on 16 May 1916 when the tramway was extended to Frognerseteren. The station was originally called Lia.

Preceding station	Oslo Metro	Following station
Skogen towards Frognerseteren	Line 1	Holmenkollen towards Bergkrystallen
