= Ris, Norway =

Neighborhood in Oslo, Norway

Coordinates: 59.9477°N 10.7013°E

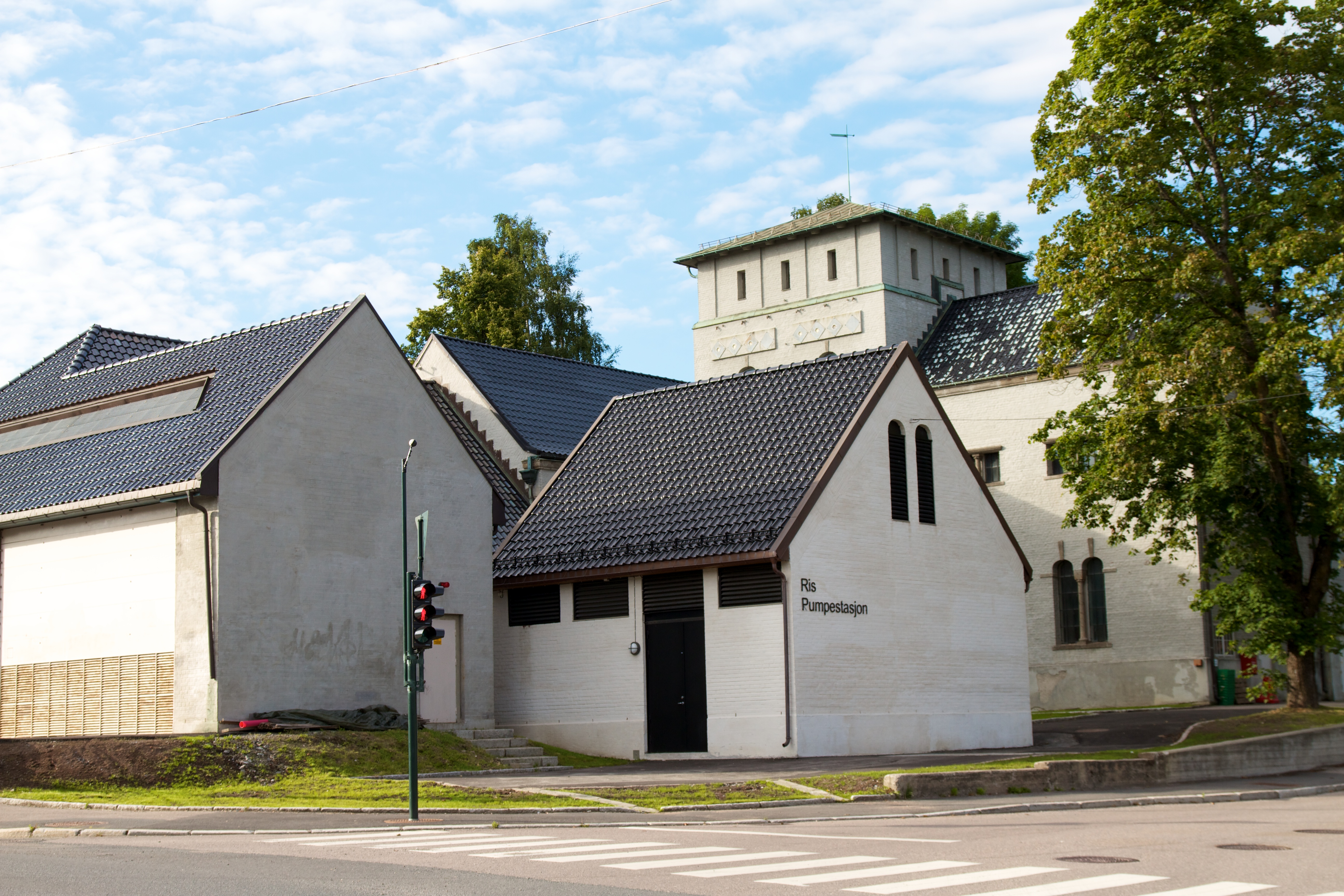
Ris pumping station.

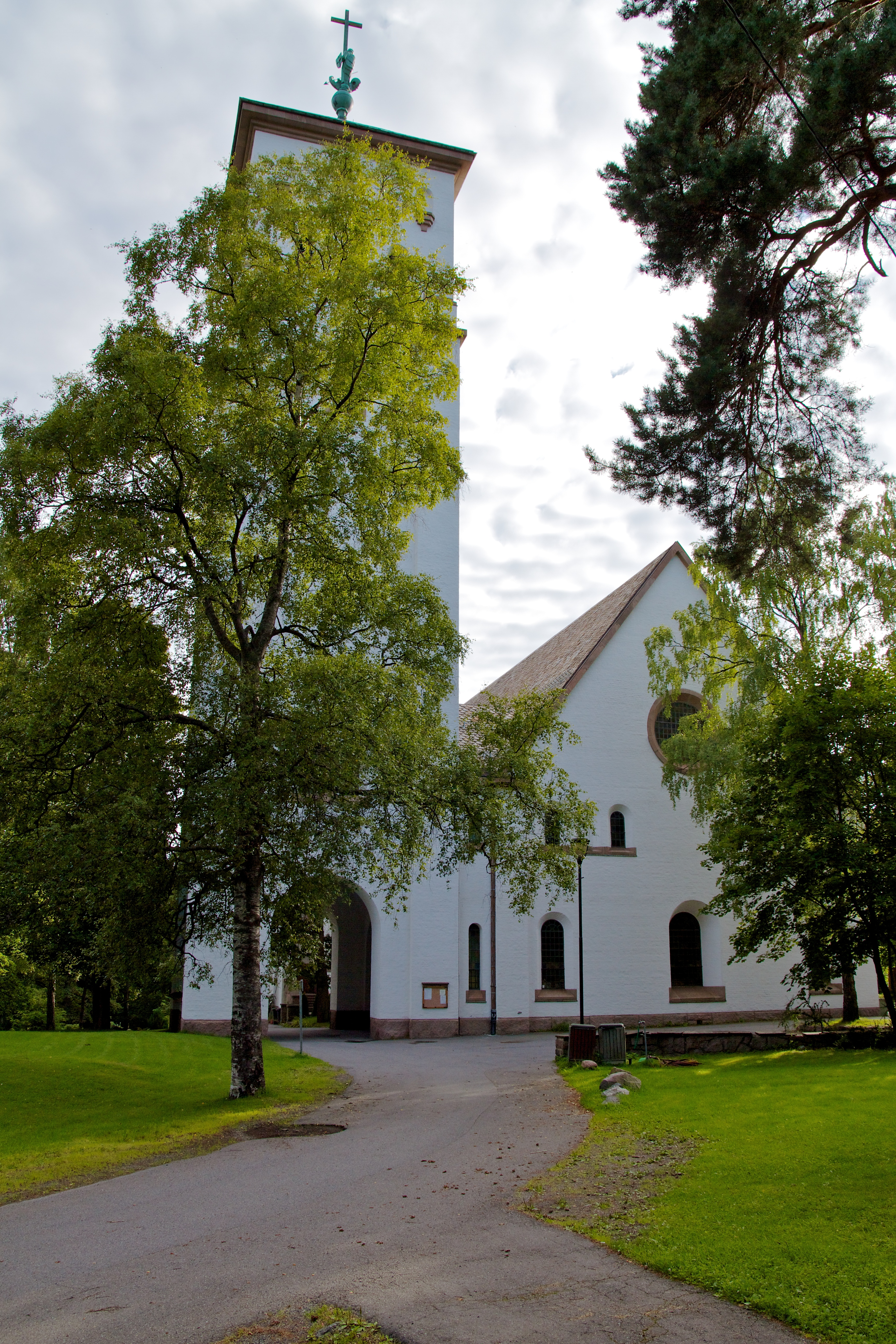
Ris Church.

Ris (formerly written Riis) is an affluent neighborhood in the borough of Vestre Aker in the West End of Oslo, Norway.

It has its origins in Ris farm, which is known from medieval times. Crofts under Ris farm include Trosterud and Slemdal. In 1898 the Holmenkollen Line was opened, and went past Ris. The farming area was subsequently parcelled out and built up. The area is currently served by Ris station. Ris Church, designed by Carl Berner, was inaugurated in 1932.
