= Slemdal (station) =

Oslo metro station

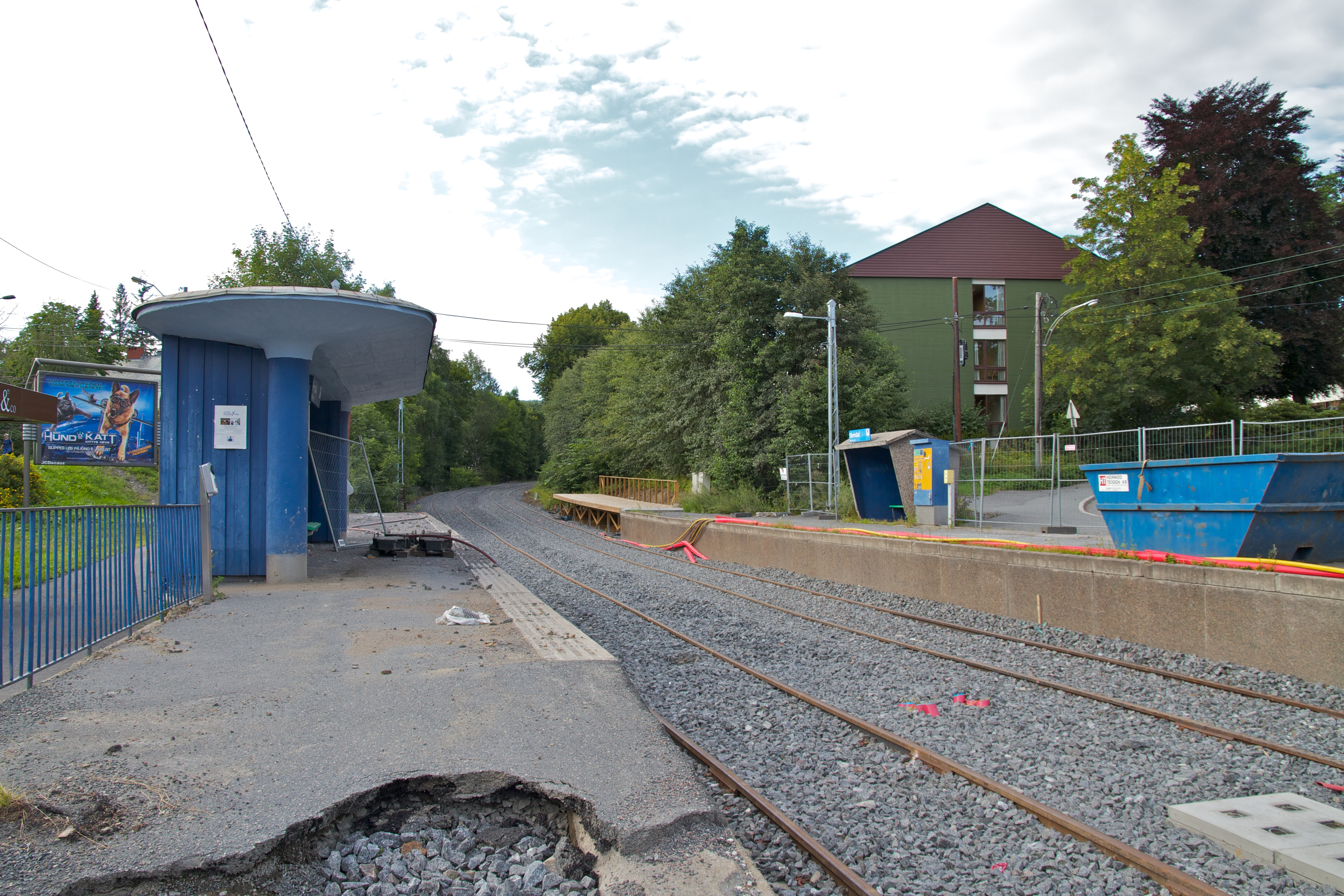

General information
- Location: Slemdal, Oslo; Norway
- Coordinates: 59°57′02″N 10°41′39″E
- Elevation: 144.6 m (474 ft)
- Owner: Sporveien
- Operator: Sporveien T-banen
- Line: Holmenkollen Line
- Distance: 5.9 km (3.7 mi) from Stortinget

Construction
- Structure type: At-grade
- Accessible: Yes

History
- Opened: 31 May 1898
Location

Slemdal is a station on the Holmenkollen Line of the Oslo Metro. It is served by Line 1 from Frognerseteren to Helsfyr/Bergkrystallen. It was opened on 31 May, 1898 as a tram station on the Holmenkoll Line from Majorstuen to Besserud

Preceding station	Oslo Metro	Following station
Gråkammen towards Frognerseteren	Line 1	Ris towards Bergkrystallen
