= Skogen (station) =

Oslo metro station

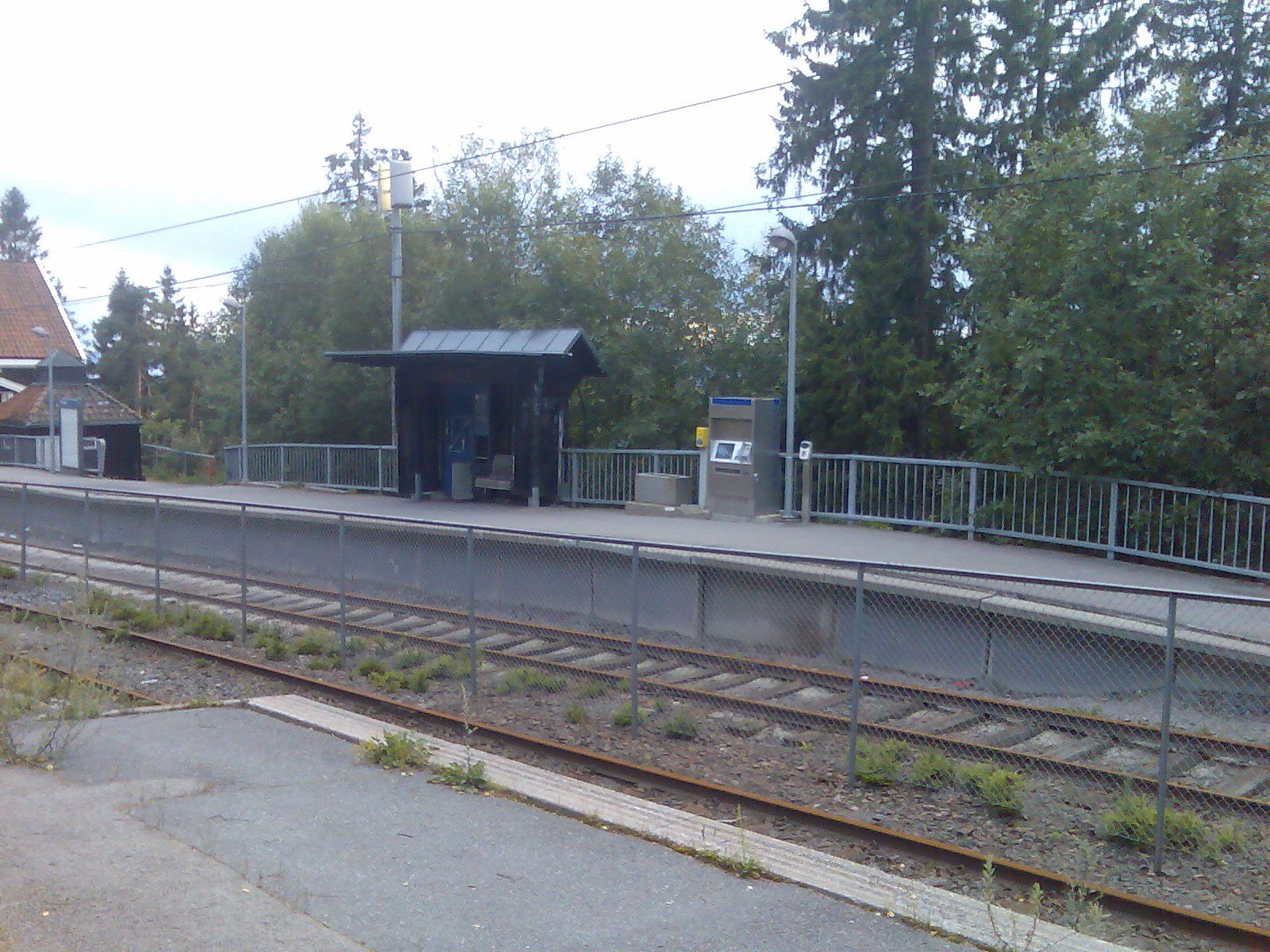

General information
- Location: Vestre Aker, Oslo; Norway
- Coordinates: 59°58′25″N 10°38′50″E
- Elevation: 378 m (1,240 ft)
- Owner: Sporveien
- Operator: Sporveien T-banen
- Line: Holmenkollen Line
- Distance: 11.9 km (7.4 mi) from Stortinget
- Connections: Bus: From Voksen Skog; 32 Kværnerbyen; 45 Majorstuen

Construction
- Structure type: At-grade
- Accessible: Yes

History
- Opened: 16 May 1916
Location

Skogen is a station on the Holmenkollen Line located between Voksenlia and Lillevann, in Oslo, Norway. The station is at an altitude of 378 meters (1,240 ft) above mean sea level. The station was opened on 16 May 1916 with the extension of the line from Besserud to Frognerseteren. The architect for the station was Erik Glosimodt.

The greatest density of buildings around the station area are the apartment buildings of the Voksen Skog neighborhood on the slope on the line's west side. While there are no direct bus connections to Skogen station, there is a bus stop below these apartments.

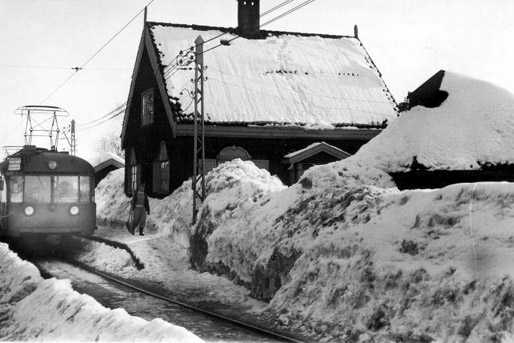
Skogen station in 1951

Preceding station	Oslo Metro	Following station
Lillevann towards Frognerseteren	Line 1	Voksenlia towards Bergkrystallen
