= IL Heming =

Norwegian sports club

- Full name: Idrettslaget Heming
- Founded: 25 May 1916
- Ground: Hemingbanen, Oslo
- League: Fourth Division
Home colours

Idrettslaget Heming is a Norwegian sports club from Slemdal, Oslo. It has sections for association football, Nordic skiing, alpine skiing, orienteering and tennis, previously also for bandy.

== General history ==
It was founded on 25 May 1916, and named after a mythological character based in the Viking Age. It has the sports field Hemingbanen and the indoor arenas Heminghallen and Nye Heminghallen near Gråkammen station. Famous members include Astrid Uhrenholdt Jacobsen, Marius Eriksen, Astrid Sandvik, Thorleif Schjelderup, Harald Maartmann and Astrid Sunde.

The men's football team currently plays in the Fourth Division, the fifth tier of Norwegian football. It last played in the Third Division in 2008.

== Orienteering ==
IL Heming was among the pioneering clubs in orienteering in the 1930s. Among the top orienteers were Otto Erichsen, Finn Jespersen and Per Bergsland. In 1939 Per Bergsland placed second at the individual Norwegian championship in orienteering held at Modum Municipality. During World War II Bergsland was a pilot in the RAF 332 Squadron. He was shot down at Dieppe Raid, and held at the POW camp Stalag Luft III and one of only three men to escape to freedom in the "Great Escape" in 1944. At the Scandinavian cup between Sweden and Norway held 10 sept 1939 two of Heming's orienteers excelled at the individual competition. Otto Erichsen won the individual contest, while Finn Jespersen placed third. While a pilot for the RAF 97 Squadron during World War II, Jespersen's Lancaster was shot down over Cherbourg the night between 5 and 6 June 1944.

In 1950 IL Heming won the Norwegian orienteering championship in relay, in Hølonda Municipality, before Asker SK, the club team consisting of Ingar Jacobsen, Kr. A. Arnesen and Hans Petter Dahm. In 1951 Heming placed second in the relay championship. The club hosted the Norwegian championship in relay in 1956.
