= Holmenkollen (station) =

Oslo metro station

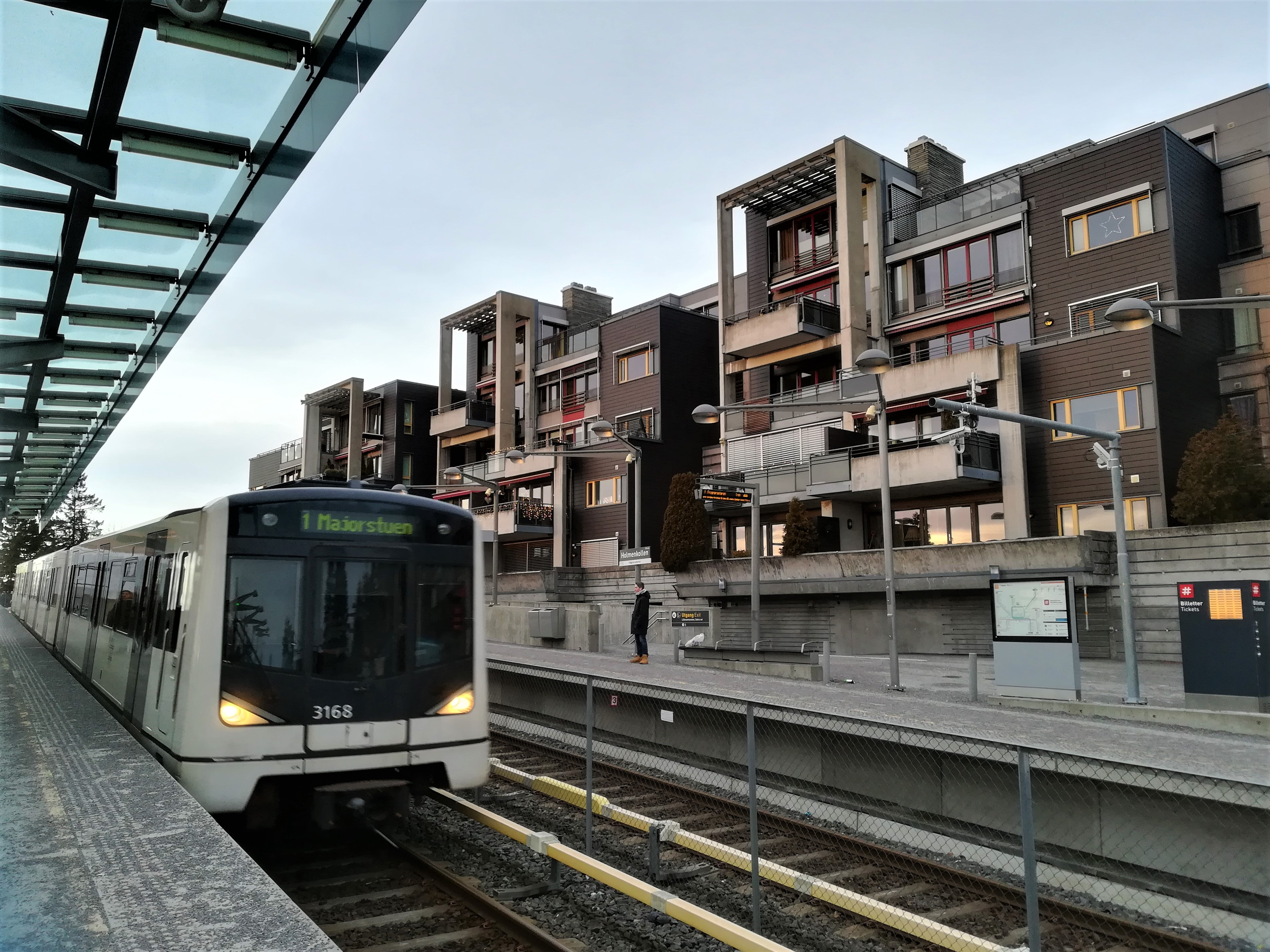

General information
- Location: Holmenkollen, Oslo; Norway
- Coordinates: 59°57′37″N 10°39′44″E
- Elevation: 277.7 m (911 ft)
- Owner: Sporveien
- Operator: Sporveien T-banen
- Line: Holmenkollen Line
- Distance: 9.8 km (6.1 mi) from Stortinget

Construction
- Structure type: At-grade
- Accessible: Yes

History
- Opened: 16 May 1916
Location

Holmenkollen is a station on the Holmenkollen Line (Line 1) on the Oslo Metro, located in the Holmenkollen area, between Besserud and Voksenlia. Until 1916 when Holmenkollbanen was completed, the terminus station was Besserud and was called Holmenkollen. The station is at an elevation of 277.7 meters (911 ft) above mean sea level. The station architect was Erik Glosimodt.

The station is close to the Holmenkollbakken facility and skiing museum. The area also has several residential buildings.

Preceding station	Oslo Metro	Following station
Voksenlia towards Frognerseteren	Line 1	Besserud towards Bergkrystallen
