= Ris (station) =

Metro station in Oslo Norway

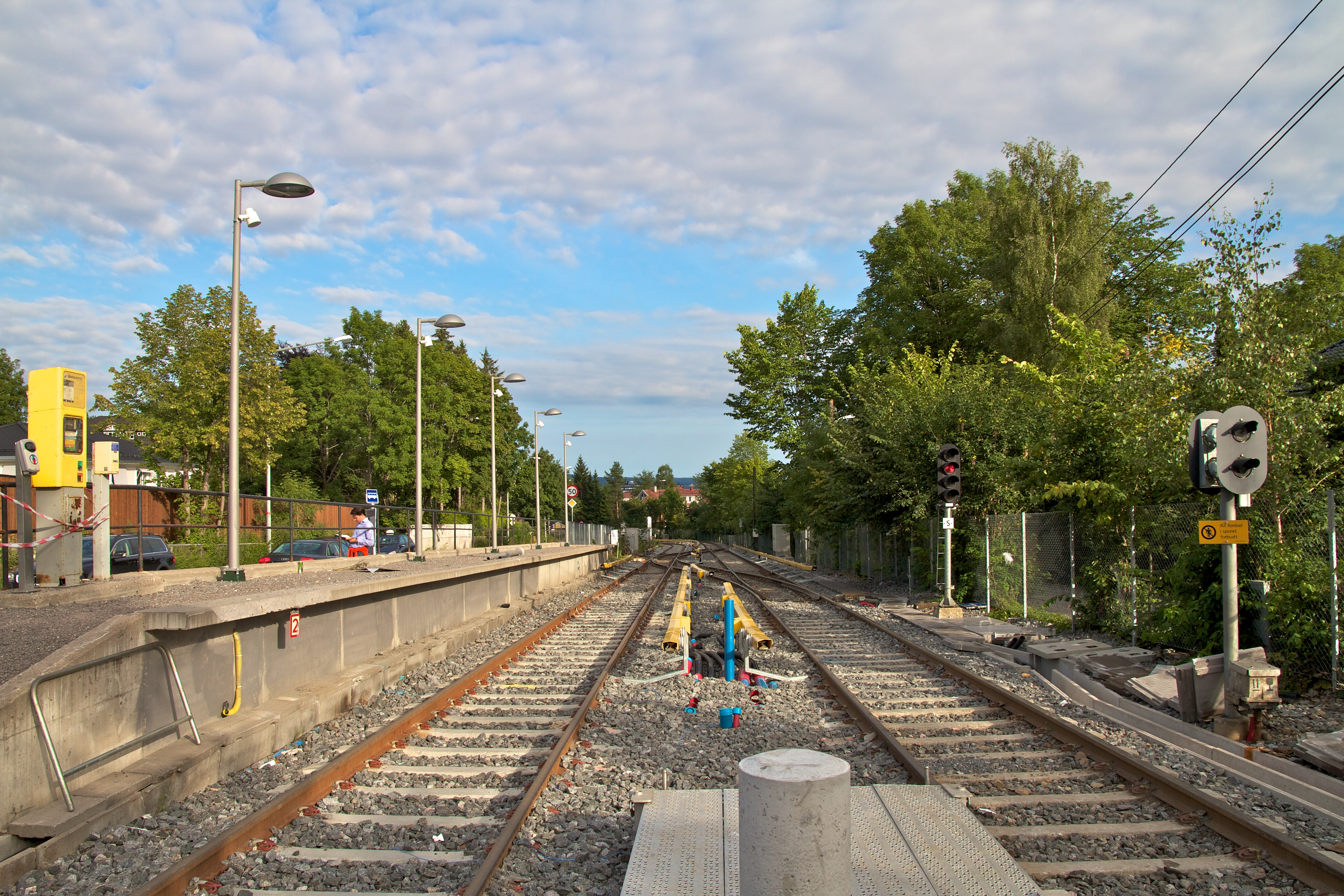

General information
- Location: Ris, Vestre Aker, Oslo; Norway
- Coordinates: 59°56′51″N 10°42′18″E
- Elevation: 121.3 m (398 ft)
- Owner: Sporveien
- Operator: Sporveien T-banen
- Line: Holmenkollen Line
- Distance: 5.2 km (3.2 mi) from Stortinget
- Platforms: 2 side platforms
- Tracks: 2

Construction
- Structure type: At-grade
- Accessible: Yes

History
- Opened: 31 May 1898

Services
| Preceding station | Oslo Metro | Following station |
|---|---|---|
| Slemdal towards Frognerseteren | Line 1 Holmenkollen Line | Gaustad towards Bergkrystallen |
Location

Ris is a rapid transit station of the Oslo Metro's Holmenkollen Line. It is situated in the Ris neighborhood of the Oslo, Norway, borough of Vestre Aker. Located 5.2 kilometers (3.2 mi) from Stortinget, the station is served by Line 1 of the metro every fifteen minutes. Travel time to Stortinget is 11 minutes. The station opened on 31 May 1898. A shed was moved to the station in 1916. There are proposals to extend the platforms.

== History ==
Ris opened at the same time as the Holmenkollen Line on 31 May 1898, and was originally named Riis. It was named for the farm Ris. With the arrival of the tram line, construction of housing started in the vicinity. This continued until the 1940s. The station received a small waiting roof on the outbound platform, designed by Erik Glosimodt. For the inbound platform a former privet was moved from Slemdal Station. Ris later established itself as a neighborhood center, with Ris School in 1922 and Ris Church in 1932.

The line was renovated as a metro line from 2009, and opened again on 6 December 2010. There was not time for an outright upgrade to the stations, so Ris remains with its pre-upgrade platforms and amenities.

== Service ==
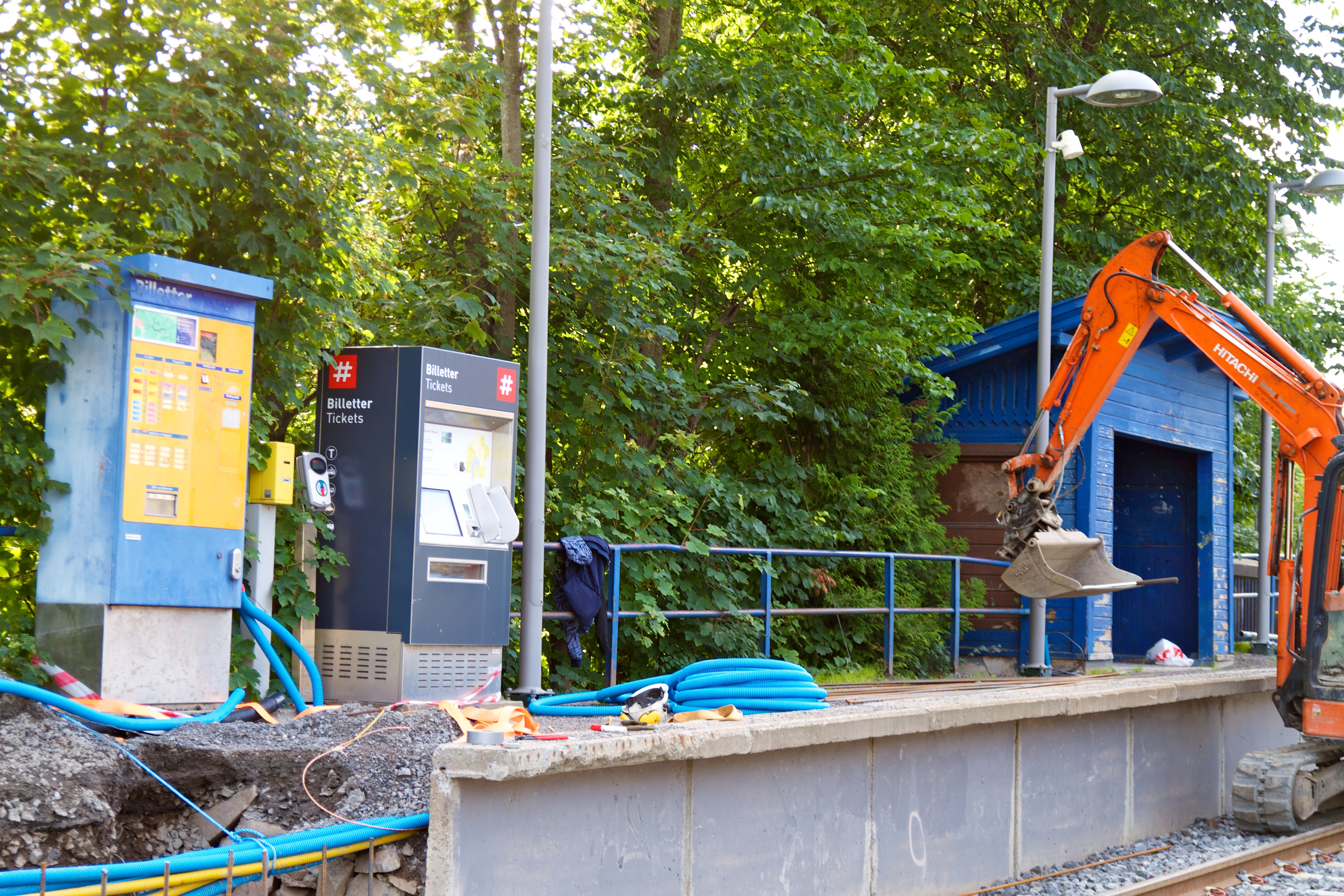
The inbound platform during the 2010 renovations

The station is served by Line 1 of the Oslo Metro. During regular hours, it operates at a 15-minute headway. Travel time to Stortinget is 11 minutes. Operations are carried out by Sporveien T-banen on contract with Ruter, the public transport authority in Oslo and Akershus. The infrastructure itself is owned by Sporveien, a municipal company. Service is provided using MX3000 three-car trains. The station had an average 409 boarding passengers in 2008. Although mid-range for the Holmenkollen Line, this is low for the metro overall. Ris is located in fare zone 1.

== Facilities ==
Frøen is a rapid transit station situated on the Holmenkollen Line, 5.2 kilometers (3.2 mi) from Stortinget in the city center. It is situated at an elevation of 121.3 meters (398 ft) above mean sea level. The station is located at the intersection of Slemdalsveien and Trosterudveien, although neither crosses the tracks at Ris. The platforms are much shorter than the norm for the metro and only have space for two cars. They are not located across from each other. There is a wooden shed in Swiss chalet style on the inbound platform.

In conjunction with an upgrade to the line to metro standard, there were plans for Ris to receive longer platforms, though the platforms were too narrow to meet the standards, and the upgrade of the station has been omitted from the 2032 plans. [12]
