= Midtstuen (station) =

Oslo metro station

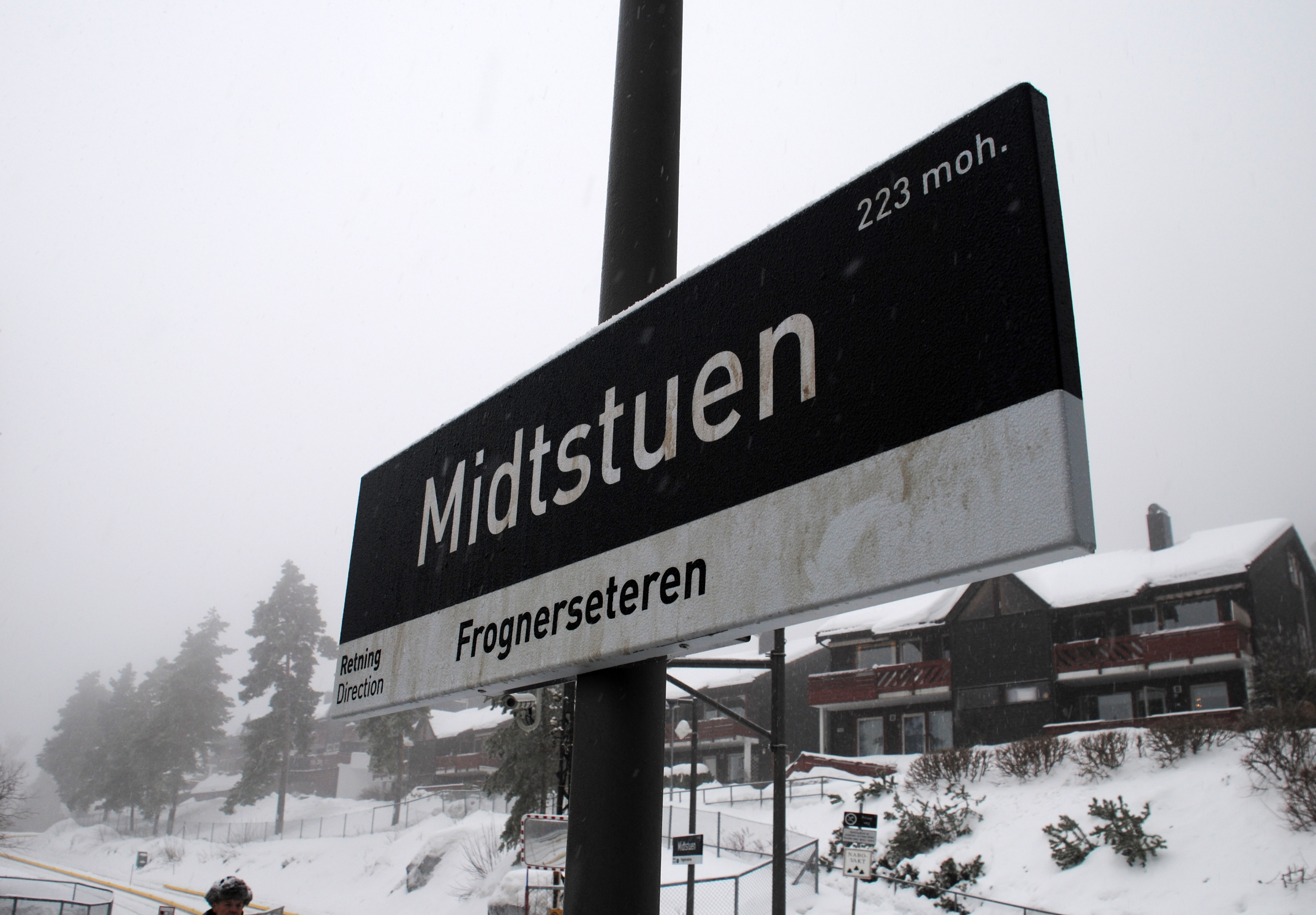

General information
- Location: Midtstuen, Vestre Aker, Oslo; Norway
- Coordinates: 59°57′40″N 10°40′59″E
- Elevation: 223.3 m (733 ft)
- Owner: Sporveien
- Operator: Sporveien T-banen
- Line: Holmenkollen Line
- Distance: 8.4 km (5.2 mi) from Stortinget

Construction
- Structure type: At-grade
- Accessible: Yes

History
- Opened: 31 May 1898
Location

Midtstuen is a station on the Holmenkollen Line (Line 1) on the Oslo Metro, between Skådalen and Besserud. It is the lower end of the popular tobogganing course Korketrekkeren. Midtstuen is located at an altitude of 223.3 meters (733 ft).

== History ==
The station was opened on 31 May 1898 as part of the tramway to Besserud. The original name of the station was Frognerseterveien. On 22 October 1987, a train carrying 12 passengers suffered a catastrophic failure in the braking system further up the line, causing it to roll down and finally tipping over at Midtstuen. One person was killed in the crash and four were seriously injured.

Preceding station	Oslo Metro	Following station
Besserud towards Frognerseteren	Line 1	Skådalen towards Bergkrystallen
