= Voksenkollen station =

Oslo metro station

Voksenkollen
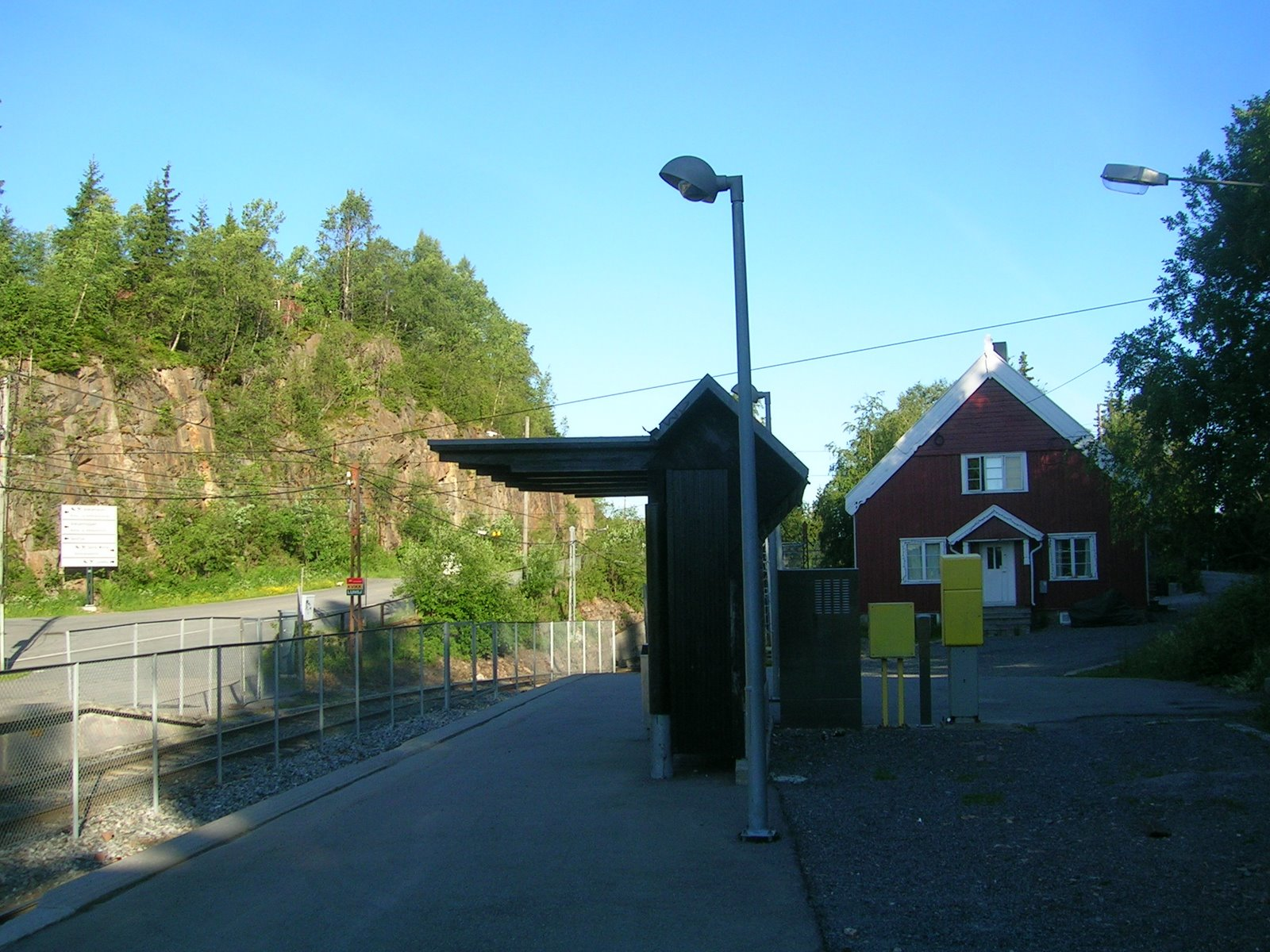

General information
- Location: Vestre Aker, Oslo; Norway
- Coordinates: 59°58′48″N 10°39′55″E
- Elevation: 460.0 m (1,509.2 ft)
- Owner: Sporveien
- Operator: Sporveien T-banen
- Line: Holmenkollen Line
- Distance: 13.7 km (8.5 mi) from Stortinget

Construction
- Structure type: At-grade
- Accessible: Yes

History
- Opened: 16 May 1916
Location

Voksenkollen is a station on the Holmenkollen Line (Line 1) of the Oslo Metro. It is the penultimate station on the line, between Lillevann and Frognerseteren. It is also the second highest station on the network, 460 meters (1,510 ft) above mean sea level. The station was opened on 16 May 1916 when the line was extended from Besserud (then called Holmenkollen) to Frognerseteren.

The station is the one closest to the transmitting tower and tourist attraction Tryvannstårnet. Also near the station are a number of hotels and conference centres, including Soria Moria, where the Stoltenberg's Second Cabinet had their preliminary discussions in 2005.

Preceding station	Oslo Metro	Following station
Frognerseteren Terminus	Line 1	Lillevann towards Bergkrystallen
