= Gråkammen (station) =

Oslo metro station

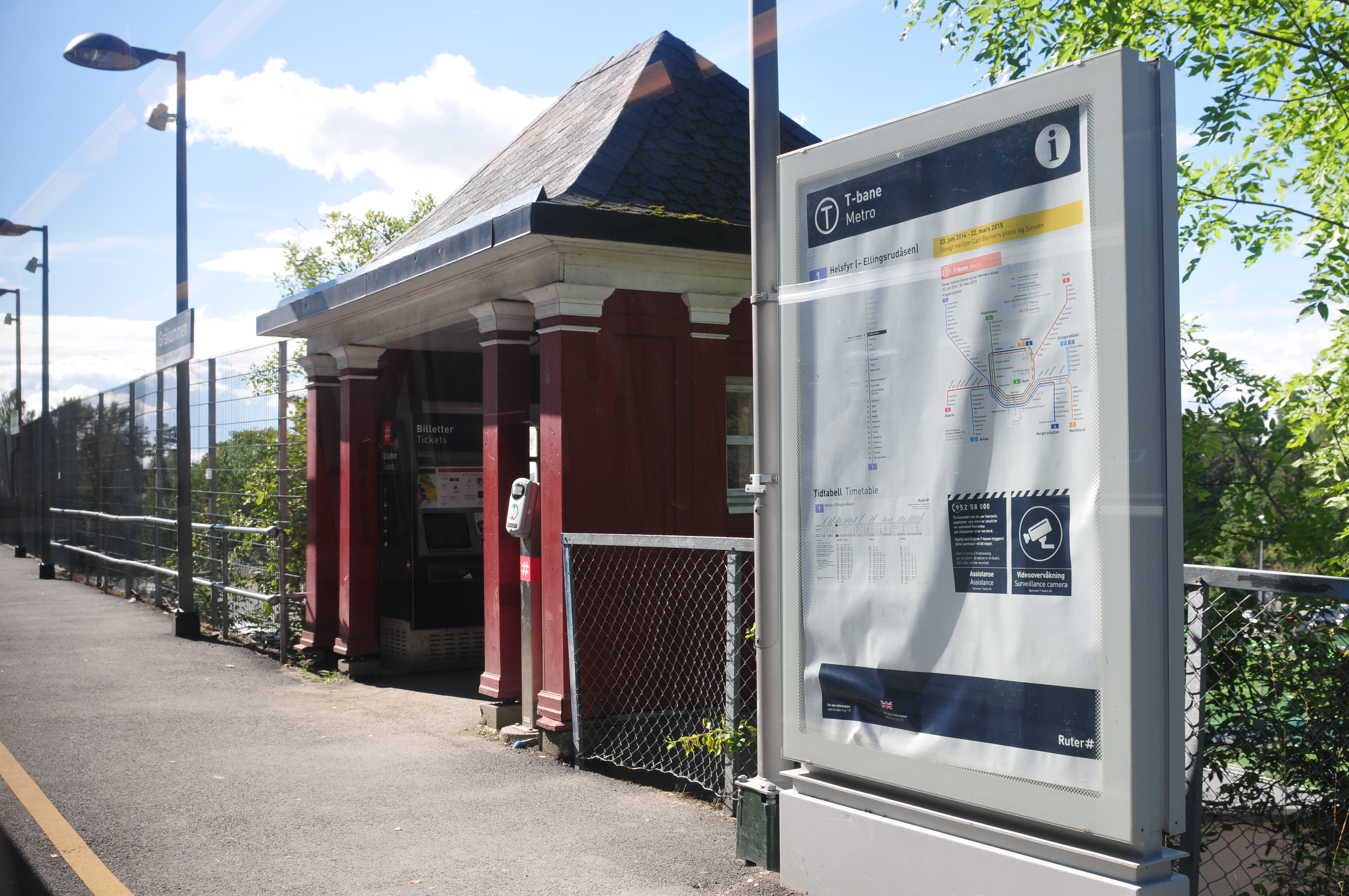
- Station platform

General information
- Location: Vestre Aker, Oslo; Norway
- Coordinates: 59°57′19″N 10°42′6″E
- Elevation: 170.1 m (558 ft)
- Owner: Sporveien
- Operator: Sporveien T-banen
- Line: Holmenkollen Line
- Distance: 6.6 km (4.1 mi) from Stortinget

Construction
- Structure type: At-grade
- Accessible: Yes

History
- Opened: 31 May 1898
Location

Gråkammen is a station on the Holmenkollen Line (Line 1) of the Oslo Metro. It is located between Gulleråsen and Slemdal. The station was opened on 31 May 1898 as part of the tramway to Besserud. It derives its name from the surrounding hillocks (Gråkammen is Norwegian for Grey Ridge).

Preceding station	Oslo Metro	Following station
Gulleråsen towards Frognerseteren	Line 1	Slemdal towards Bergkrystallen
