= Slemdal =

Neighborhood in Oslo, Norway

Coordinates: 59°57′N 10°42′E

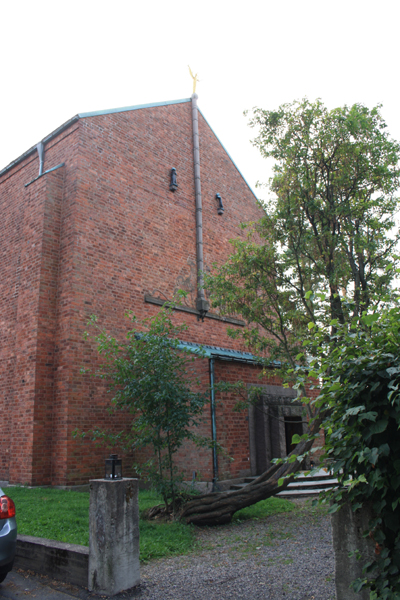
Tomba Emanuel, the mausoleum of Emanuel Vigeland

Slemdal is a neighborhood in the borough of Vestre Aker in Oslo, Norway.

The neighborhood lies south of Vettakollen, and was built up from the 1890s. It is served by the Oslo Metro station Slemdal. The local sports team is IL Heming.

The mausoleum of Emanuel Vigeland is located at Slemdal. Vigeland called it Tomba Emmanuelle.
