= Holmenkollen =

Neighbourhood of Oslo, Norway

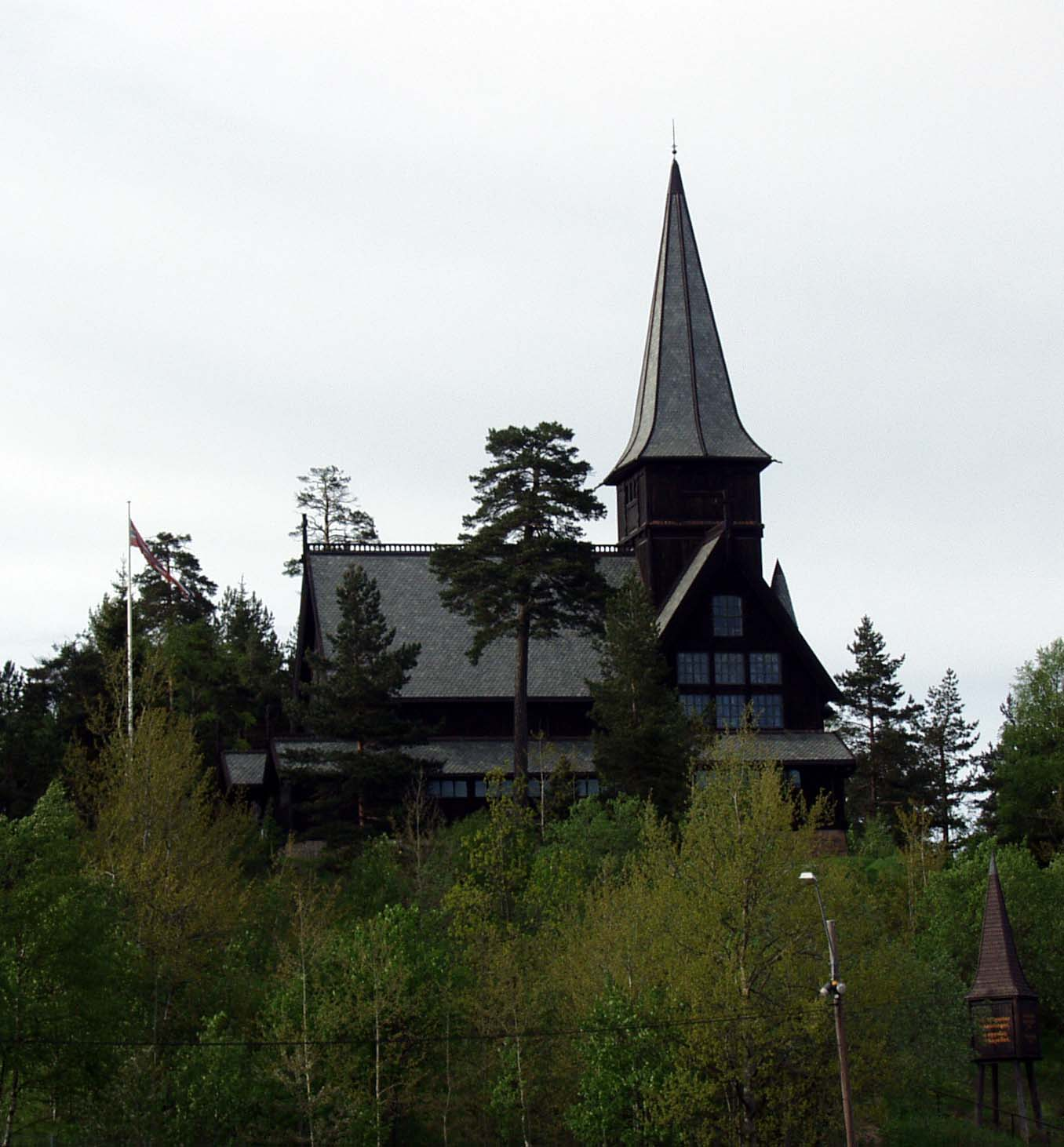
- Holmenkollen Chapel

- Location within Norway
- Coordinates: 59°57′38″N 10°39′51″E

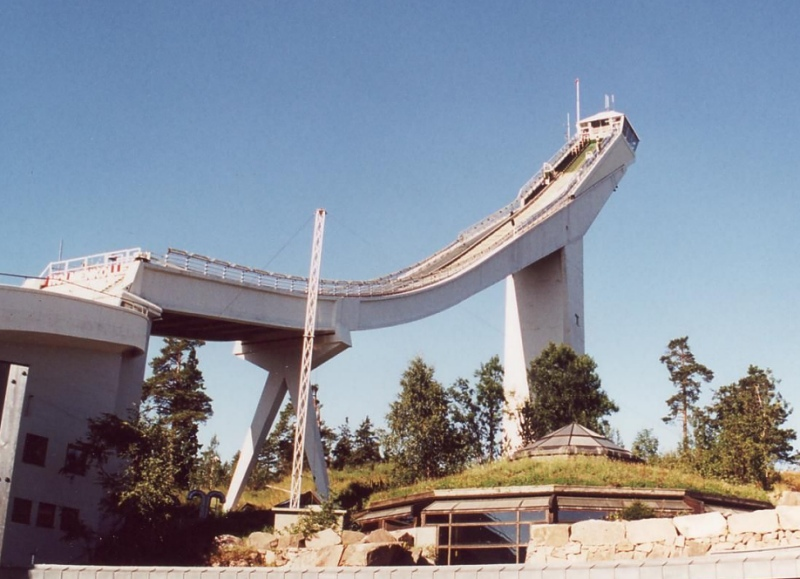
The Holmenkollen ski jump is a landmark in Oslo. This is the hill that was demolished in 2008 to make way for a new one in 2010.

Holmenkollen (Urban East Norwegian pronunciation: [ˈhɔ̂ɫmn̩ˌkɔɫn̩]) is a mountain and a neighbourhood in the Vestre Aker borough of Oslo, Norway. It goes up to 500 metres (1,600 ft) above sea level and is well known for its international skiing competitions.

== Etymology ==
The name is a compound of the farm name Holmen and the finite form of kolle 'knoll'. The name Holmen is itself a compound of the Old Norse words holmi 'elevated space on land' and vin 'meadow'.

== History and landmarks ==
In addition to being a residential area, the area has been a ski recreation area since the late 19th century, with its famous ski jumping hill, the Holmenkollbakken, hosting competitions since 1892. To the north, the area borders the Marka woodlands area.

The Holmenkoll Line of the Oslo Metro runs through the neighborhood, serving the stations Besserud and Holmenkollen.

The Holmenkollen Chapel was destroyed by arson in August 1992 by black metal artists Varg Vikernes, Bård “Faust” Eithun and Øystein “Euronymous” Aarseth, but later rebuilt.

The chapel is a neighbour to the Norwegian Royal Lodge, the residence of the Norwegian royal family during events like Christmas and Holmenkollen Ski Festival.

== Climate ==
Holmenkollen has a humid continental climate transitional with maritime subarctic influenced by its elevated position above the valley consisting of Oslo's downtown. It has cooler weather than the lower elevations, especially in summer and more precipitation both in terms of rain and snow because of orographic lift. Winter temperatures are slightly colder than in lower areas, although the difference is lower at that time of the year. Even so, Holmenkollen usually maintains a sizeable snowpack. In spite of the elevation, summer temperatures are comparable to sea level locations on the North Sea both in Norway and Scotland.

Climate data for Tryvannshøgda, 514 m asl (1991-2020 averages; extremes 1950–1978 & since 1998)
Month	Jan	Feb	Mar	Apr	May	Jun	Jul	Aug	Sep	Oct	Nov	Dec	Year
Record high °C (°F)	8.0 (46.4)	11.7 (53.1)	17.8 (64.0)	21.0 (69.8)	27.4 (81.3)	28.9 (84.0)	31.0 (87.8)	26.0 (78.8)	23.5 (74.3)	20.2 (68.4)	13.1 (55.6)	8.7 (47.7)	31.0 (87.8)
Mean maximum °C (°F)	5.0 (41.0)	6.3 (43.3)	10.4 (50.7)	14.9 (58.8)	21.2 (70.2)	23.4 (74.1)	25.0 (77.0)	23.1 (73.6)	18.9 (66.0)	12.8 (55.0)	8.7 (47.7)	6.1 (43.0)	26.1 (79.0)
Mean daily maximum °C (°F)	−2.4 (27.7)	−1.9 (28.6)	1.7 (35.1)	7.2 (45.0)	12.3 (54.1)	16.3 (61.3)	18.4 (65.1)	16.7 (62.1)	12.6 (54.7)	6.1 (43.0)	1.6 (34.9)	−1.0 (30.2)	7.3 (45.2)
Daily mean °C (°F)	−4.4 (24.1)	−4.2 (24.4)	−1.2 (29.8)	3.6 (38.5)	8.3 (46.9)	12.2 (54.0)	14.5 (58.1)	13.5 (56.3)	9.4 (48.9)	3.8 (38.8)	−0.3 (31.5)	−3.0 (26.6)	4.4 (39.8)
Mean daily minimum °C (°F)	−6.4 (20.5)	−6.4 (20.5)	−4.1 (24.6)	−0.1 (31.8)	4.2 (39.6)	8.1 (46.6)	10.6 (51.1)	10.0 (50.0)	6.4 (43.5)	1.5 (34.7)	−2.2 (28.0)	−4.9 (23.2)	1.4 (34.5)
Mean minimum °C (°F)	−12.7 (9.1)	−12.8 (9.0)	−10.2 (13.6)	−4.5 (23.9)	−1.1 (30.0)	3.5 (38.3)	7.2 (45.0)	5.8 (42.4)	2.2 (36.0)	−3.5 (25.7)	−8.3 (17.1)	−10.8 (12.6)	−15.4 (4.3)
Record low °C (°F)	−23.6 (−10.5)	−25.4 (−13.7)	−18.1 (−0.6)	−10.4 (13.3)	−4.0 (24.8)	−0.6 (30.9)	2.4 (36.3)	−0.1 (31.8)	−2.0 (28.4)	−8.9 (16.0)	−14.8 (5.4)	−18.1 (−0.6)	−25.4 (−13.7)
Average precipitation mm (inches)	94.6 (3.72)	78.9 (3.11)	61.8 (2.43)	62.0 (2.44)	90.1 (3.55)	102.3 (4.03)	123.1 (4.85)	151.9 (5.98)	113.8 (4.48)	127.3 (5.01)	130.1 (5.12)	98.4 (3.87)	1,234.3 (48.59)
Source: Norsk Klimaservicesenter
