= Vettakollen =

Neighbourhood in Oslo, Norway

Coordinates: 59.9764°N 10.6989°E

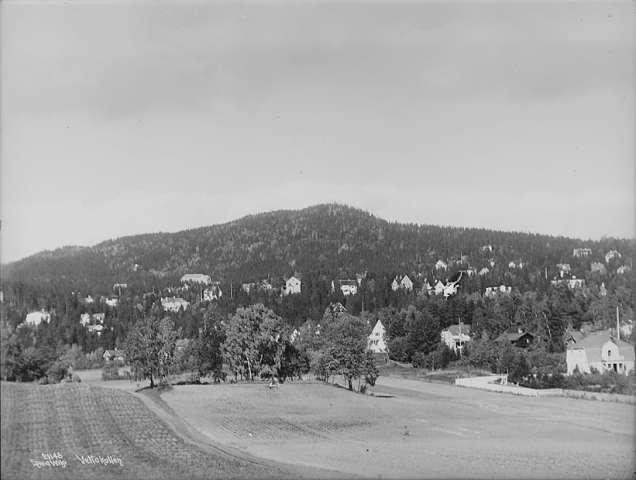
Vettakollen in 1919.

Vettakollen is a hill and neighbourhood in the borough of Vestre Aker in Oslo, Norway.

The hill lies west of Sognsvann and southeast of Voksenåsen and Holmenkollen, and measures 419 metres above mean sea level. The estimated population in the Vettakollen area is 7 600 people. The built-up residential area south of the hill is served by the Oslo Metro station Vettakollen, Gulleråsen, Gråkammen and Skådalen.

The name stems from the beacon hill's former use as the site of a beacon (Norwegian: varde). Before modern times, such beacons were set alight on a series of hills to constitute an alarm system. The naming is found in other hills, such as Vardåsen, Varingskollen and probably Brannfjell.
