= Besserud (station) =

Oslo metro station

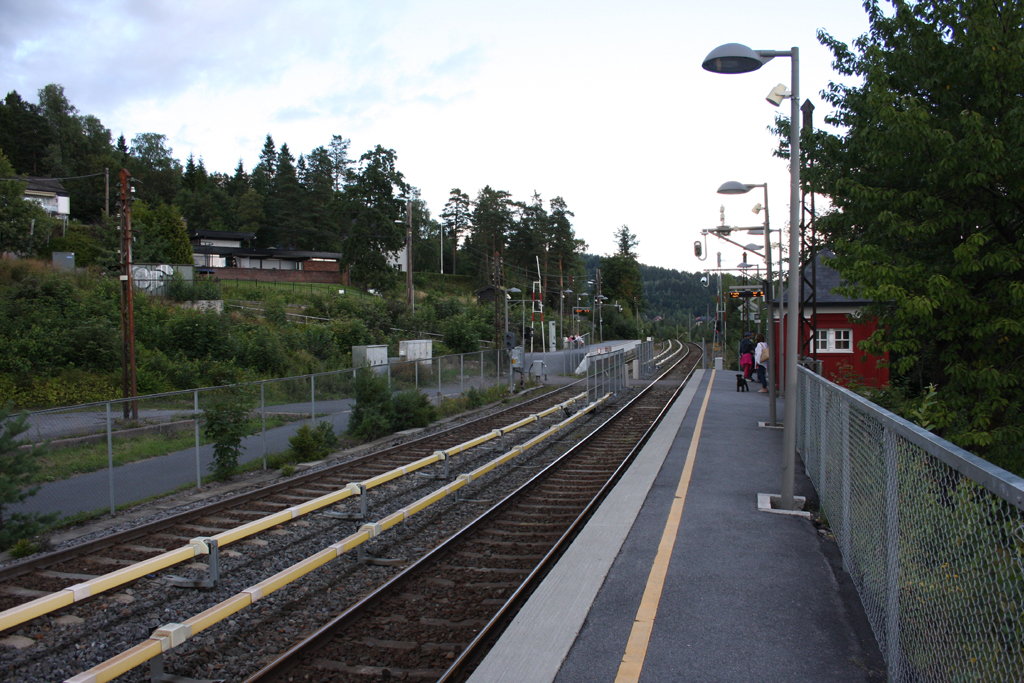

General information
- Location: Holmenkollen, Oslo; Norway
- Coordinates: 59°57′27″N 10°40′20″E
- Elevation: 242.2 m (795 ft)
- Owner: Sporveien
- Operator: Sporveien T-banen
- Line: Holmenkollen Line
- Distance: 9.1 km (5.7 mi) from Stortinget

Construction
- Structure type: At-grade
- Accessible: Yes

History
- Opened: 31 May 1898
Location

Besserud is a station on the Holmenkollen Line (Line 1) on the Oslo Metro, between Midtstuen and Holmenkollen.

== History ==
The station was opened as the terminus of the Holmenkollen Line on 31 May 1889, and was originally named Holmenkollen. When the line was extended to Frognerseteren on 16 May 1916 the station acquired its current name. The architect for the wooden station building was Paul Due.

Preceding station	Oslo Metro	Following station
Holmenkollen towards Frognerseteren	Line 1	Midtstuen towards Bergkrystallen
