= Holmenkollen Line =

Metro line in Oslo, Norway

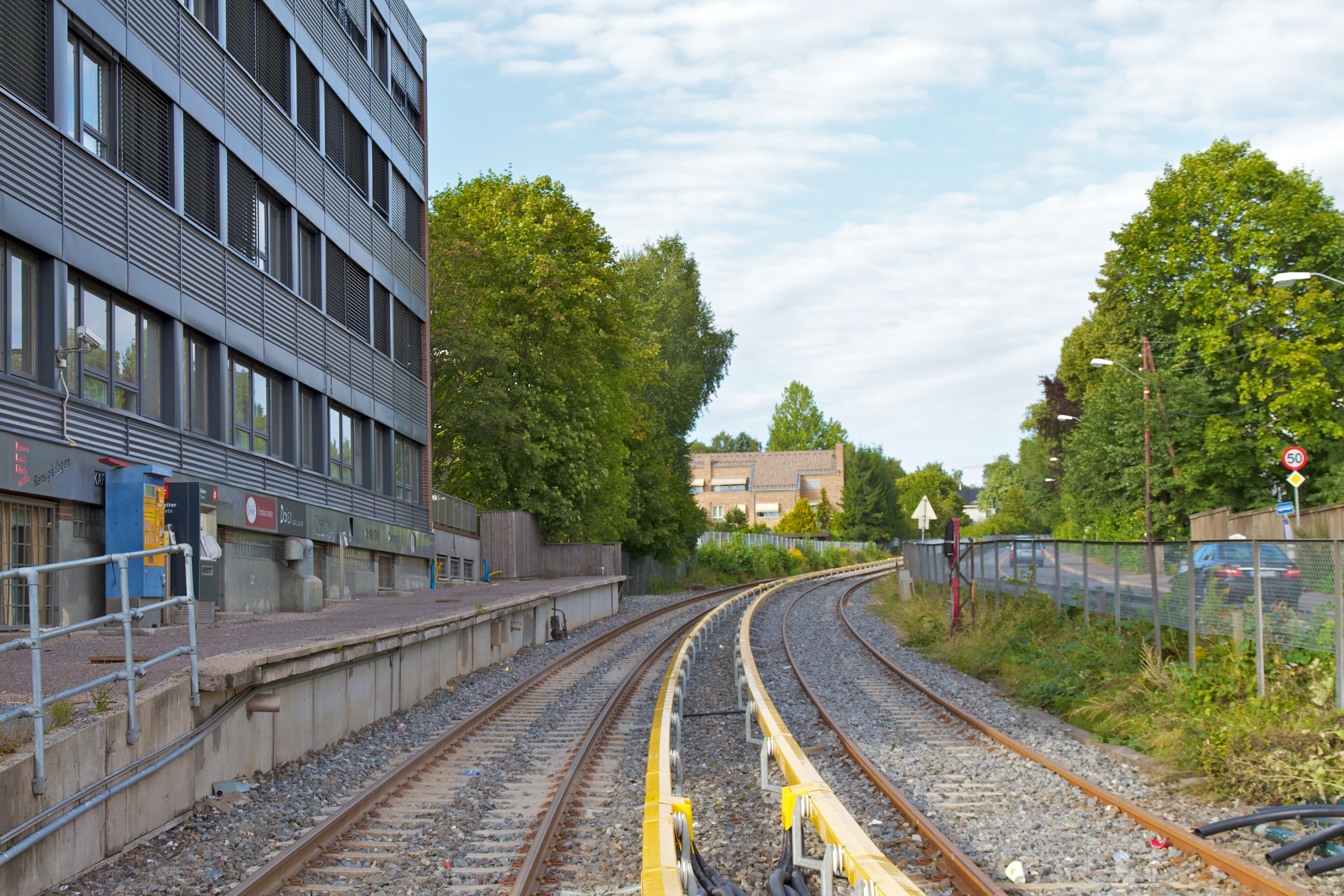
- Vinderen Station

Overview
- Native name: Holmenkollbanen
- Status: Operational
- Owner: Sporveien
- Termini: Majorstuen; Frognerseteren
- Stations: 19

Service
- Type: Rapid transit
- System: Oslo Metro
- Operator(s): Sporveien T-banen
- Rolling stock: MX3000

History
- Opened: 31 May 1898

Technical
- Number of tracks: Double
- Track gauge: 1,435 mm (4 ft 8 1/2 in) standard gauge
- Electrification: 750 V DC third rail
- Operating speed: 70 km/h (43 mph)
- Highest elevation: 469 m (1,539 ft)

The Holmenkollen Line (Norwegian: Holmenkollbanen) is an 11.4-kilometre-long (7.1 mi) Oslo Metro line which runs between Majorstuen and Nordmarka in Oslo, Norway. Operating as Metro Line 1, it is the route with the fewest passengers and the only one still to have level crossings and short station platforms. The line runs mostly through residential areas of detached houses, and the upper parts of the line principally serve the recreational area of Nordmarka. Holmenkollen Station is located close to Holmenkollen National Arena which hosts international Nordic skiing tournaments. Voksenkollen Station is not far from Oslo Vinterpark (Winter) and the Oslo Sommerpark (Summer).

The line is the oldest one on the metro system, having been opened as a light railway in 1898 by the Holmenkolbanen company. Originally it ran for 6.2 km (3.9 mi) from Majorstuen Station to Besserud. In 1916, the line was extended to Tryvann, with the last 1.4 km (0.87 mi) being used for freight only. In 1928, the city terminus was moved 2.0 km (1.2 mi) to the underground Nationaltheatret Station.

== Operations ==
Since its upgrade ahead of the 2011 FIS Nordic Skiing World Championships, the Holmenkollen line has been powered by third rail and operated by single three-car sets of MX3000 trains. The Oslo public transport authority Ruter also considered continued use of the T2000 and T1300, but rejected the T2000 due to unreliability, and the T1300 due to age. The platforms are long enough to handle two cars only, so the doors in the third car are kept closed during station stops. Passengers can, however, make use of the third car by walking between the cars once they have boarded. There are numerous level crossings along the line.

As the line does not run through densely populated parts of Oslo, traffic is normally lighter than on any other line. However, there is a large amount of seasonal tourist traffic, and the line – climbing as it does to over 400 metres (1,300 ft) and providing views over Oslo – is an attraction in its own right. The Holmenkollen ski jump and Tryvannstårnet broadcasting tower are further attractions along the line.

== History ==
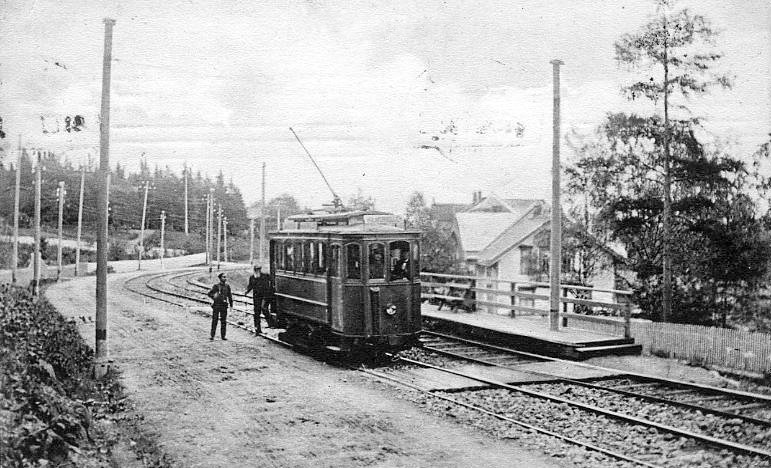
Engerjordet was used between 1905 and 1935

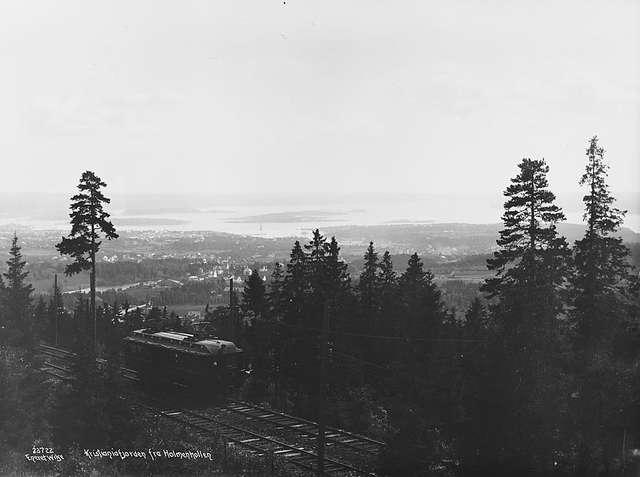
The line in 1923, showing the view over the city

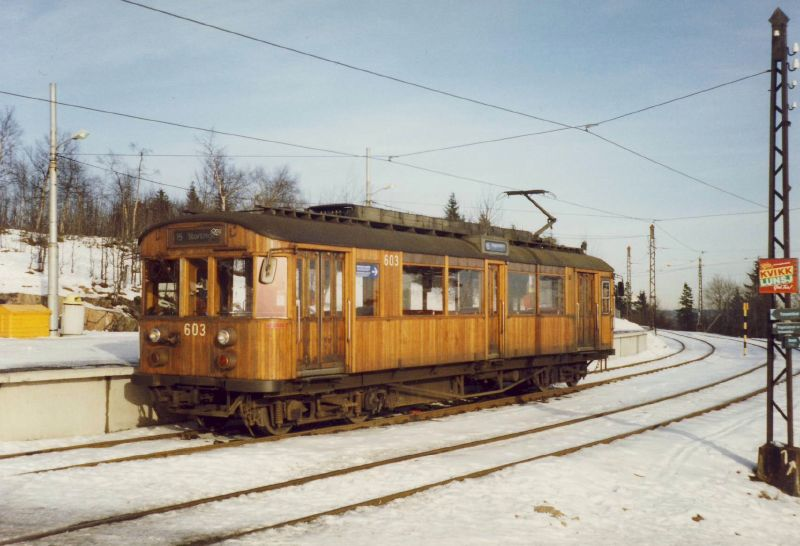
HkB 600 tram during the early 1990s

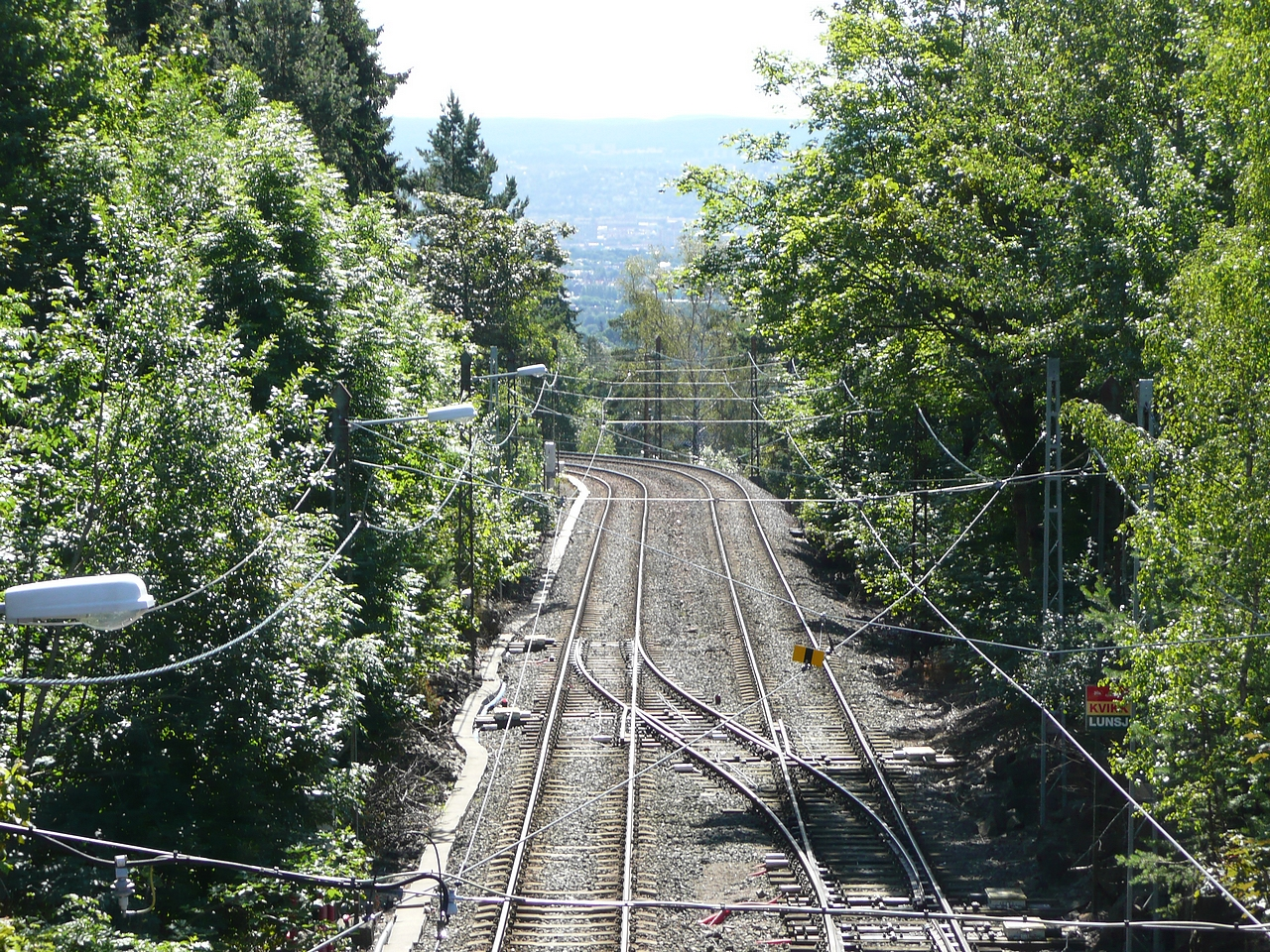
Section of the Holmenkollen Line before the removal of the overhead wires

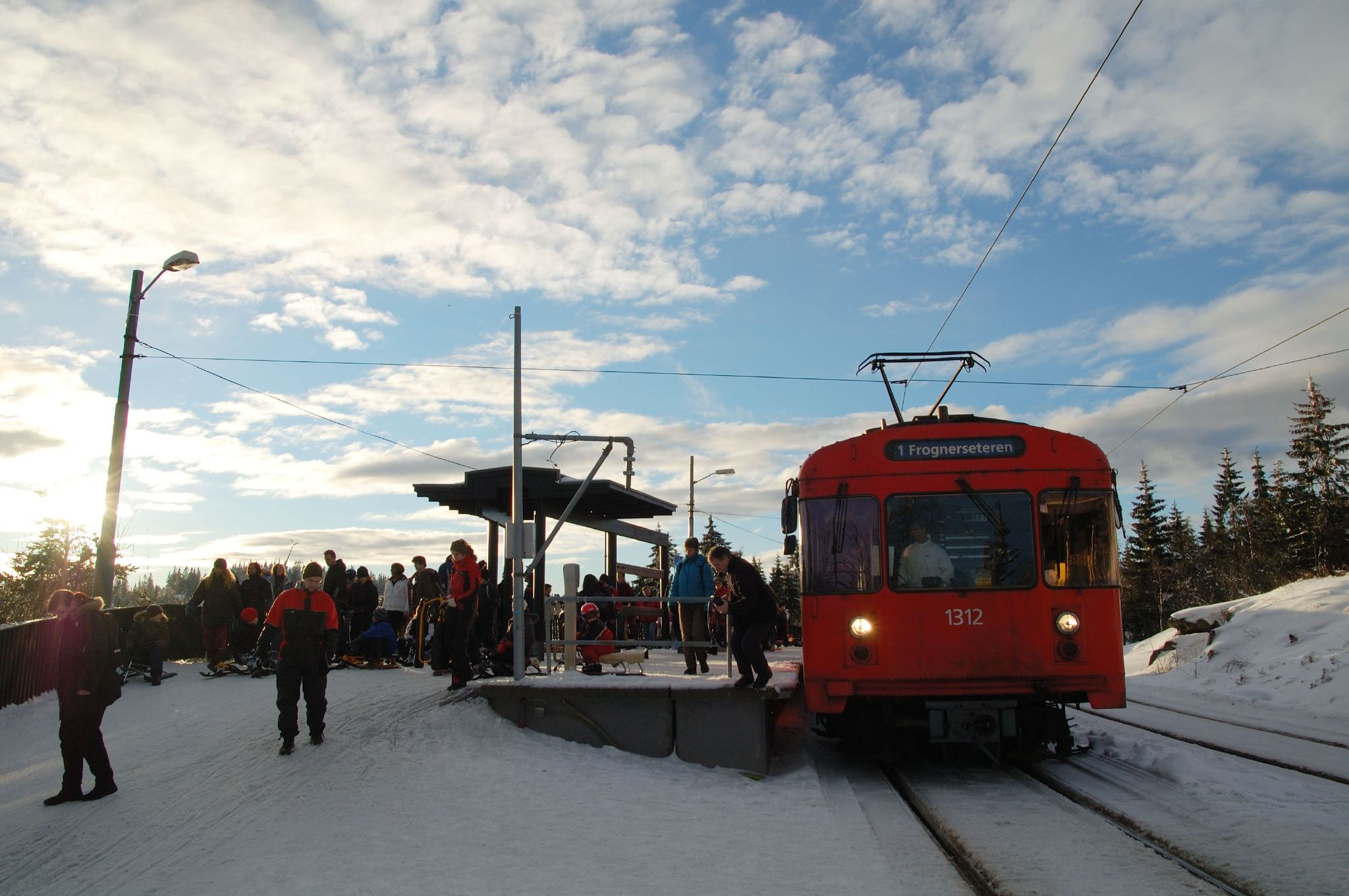
Frognerseteren is the terminus, and serves the recreational area of Nordmarka

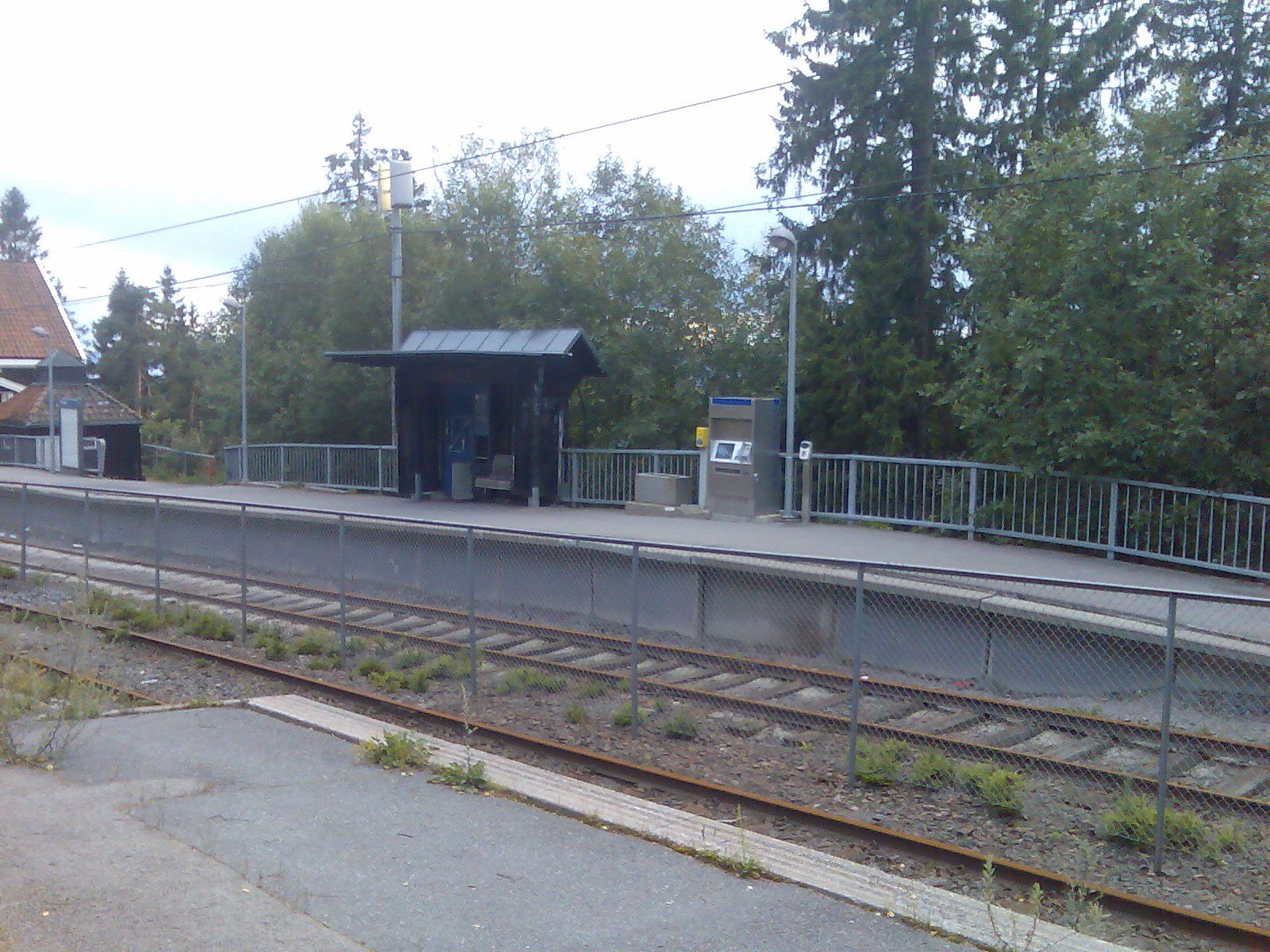
Skogen Station

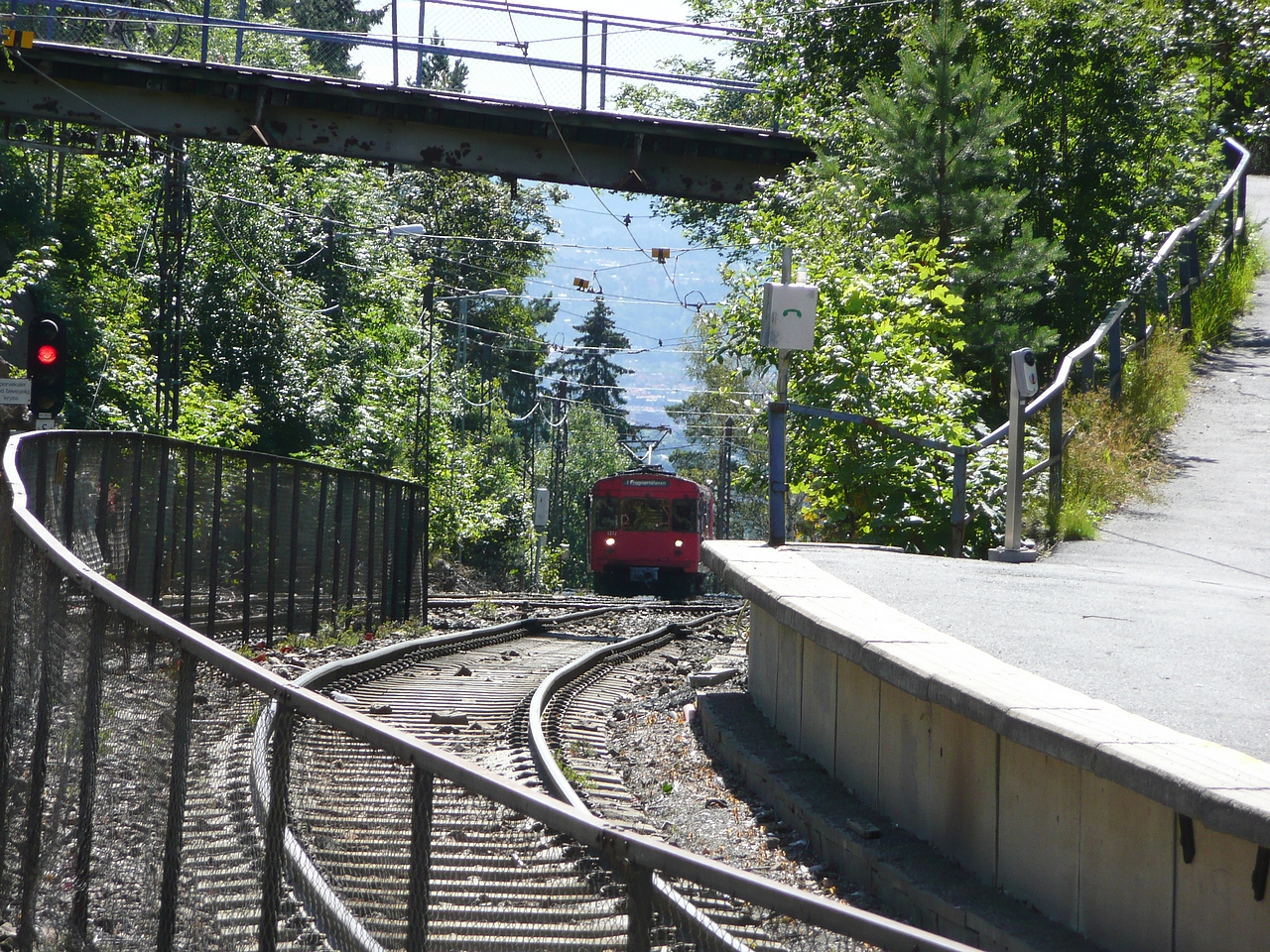
The line has a steep climb all the way from the city to the hilltop

The line was opened on 31 May 1898 as a tram line between Majorstuen and Besserud. The line was extended to Frognerseteren on 16 May 1916, and the tunnel between Majorstuen and Nationaltheatret, now part of the shared downtown subway stretch, was opened 6 June 1928, which was the first subway line in Scandinavia.

On 22 October 1987, the line suffered a fatal accident when a braking system failed in a train causing it to roll down the line, finally tipping over at Midtstuen. The accident killed one person and seriously injured four others. The accident led to scrutiny of the safety of the old teak cars which were used on the line. The old trains were pulled from service, but reintroduced after some refits of the cars until new trains were delivered in 1993.

Until 1991, A/S Holmenkolbanen was the company responsible for the operations of the line, but the company was then merged with Oslo Sporveier. In a cost-saving measure between 2002 and 2004, the line was taken off the downtown shared stretch and ran only between Majorstuen and Frognerseteren.

=== The T2000 trains ===
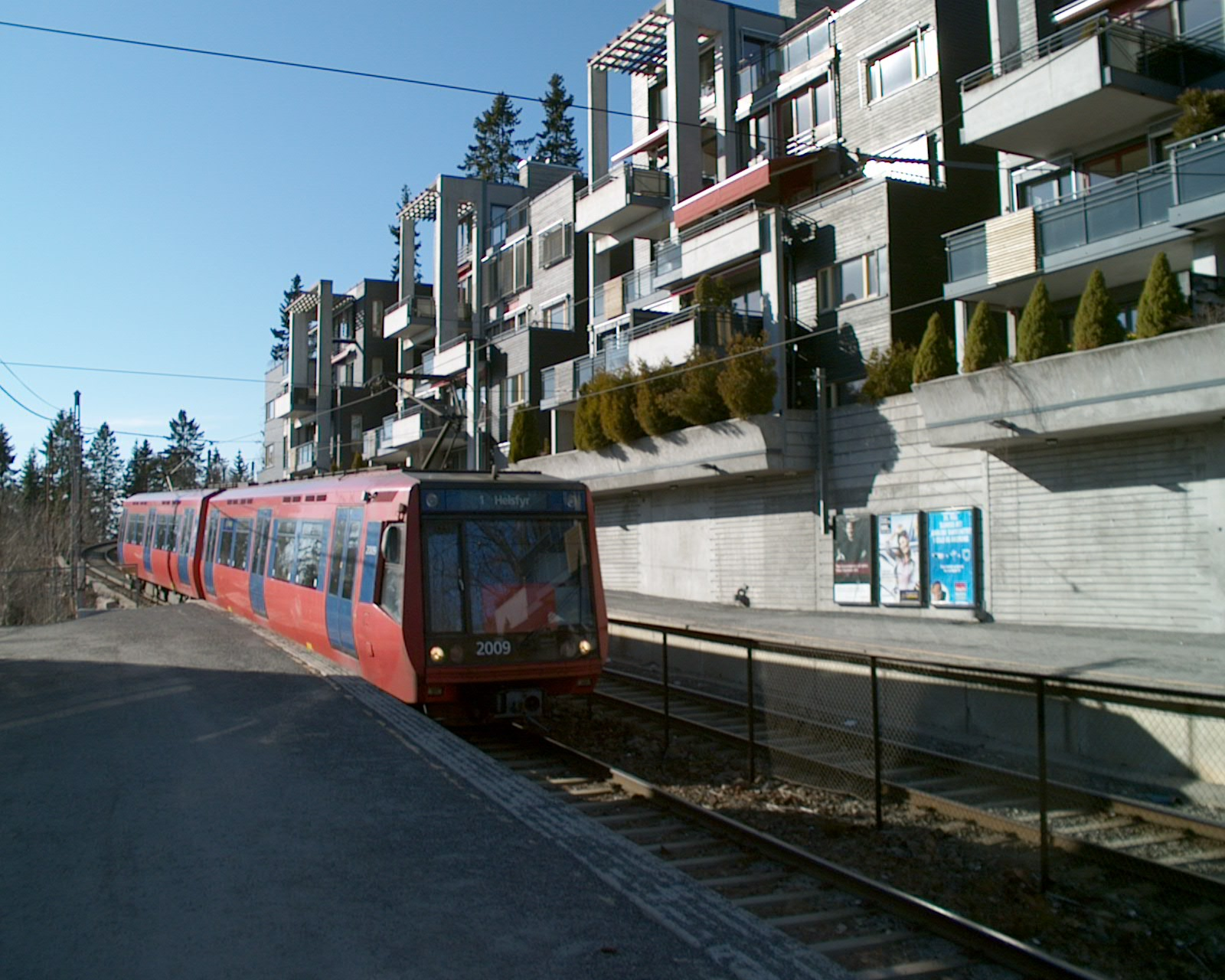
A now retired T2000 train at Holmenkollen

Oslo Sporveier was highly satisfied with the SL79 articulated trams that had been delivered during the 1980s for the tramway. In 1985, work started on the development of a modified version for the western suburban lines. The stock on the Holmenkollen and Kolsås Lines were the first that needed to be replaced. The new stock was considered to be a limited trial. If it met performance expectations, future orders could be made to replace the T1000 stock when the latter reached the end of its economical life in around 2000. The required specification for the new train was published in October 1988. On 22 October 1987, a fatal accident occurred when one of the old HkB 600 units suffered a catastrophic failure of its braking system, and rolled down the Holmenkollen Line, finally tipping over at Midtstuen. One person was killed and four were seriously injured, leading to a safety inspection of the old teak cars used on the line; the HkB 600 units were withdrawn from service, but were reintroduced after some refits.

The initial proposal had called for 22 units, to replace all of the Kolsås and Holmenkollen Line stock. However, the Sognsvann and Røa Line was upgraded to metro standard between 1992 and 1995, and could start using T1000 stock with only third-rail support. At the time, the eastern network used third-rail, while the western network used overhead wire. The upgrade used non-utilized stock, so the order for T2000 was reduced to 12 units. The order was placed with ABB Strømmen and AEG in August 1991. The high development cost was subsidised by the Norwegian government, who saw the project as potentially establishing a new industrial export product. Electrical components were built by AEG in Berlin, while the bogies were built by MAN in Nuremberg. The bodywork was built at Strømmen, with profiles from Alusuisse, and the trains were assembled in Strømmen. The six two-car sets were delivered between 2 November and 22 December 1994. The first official public presentation was made on 8 December, but the units did not enter regular service until April 1995. The cars were numbered 2001–2012. The T2000 class was prone to technical problems, and was not as reliable as the older T1000 stock. It soon became evident that no more would be ordered.

=== Proposed extension ===
In 1996, Arkitektskap made a proposal to extend the line from Frognerseteren to Tryvannshøgda, where there is among other things a skiing centre with 200,000 annual visitors. In 2008, Ruter estimated the cost to NOK 150 million, and stated that it would cost the public NOK 1,500 per ticket to extend the line the 1.4 km (0.87 mi) to Tryvann Vinterpark. Both Ruter and the city council have therefore shelved the extension. The bottleneck of the metro is the Common Tunnel, when west of Stortinget can only allow 24 trains per hour per direction. In 2003, Oslo Sporveier started terminating the Holmenkollen Line trains at Majorstuen, thus allowing the other routes of the metro to use the capacity. A year later, running the trains through the Common Tunnel were re-introduced, after ridership on the Holmenkollen Line fell drastically.

=== Metro upgrade ===
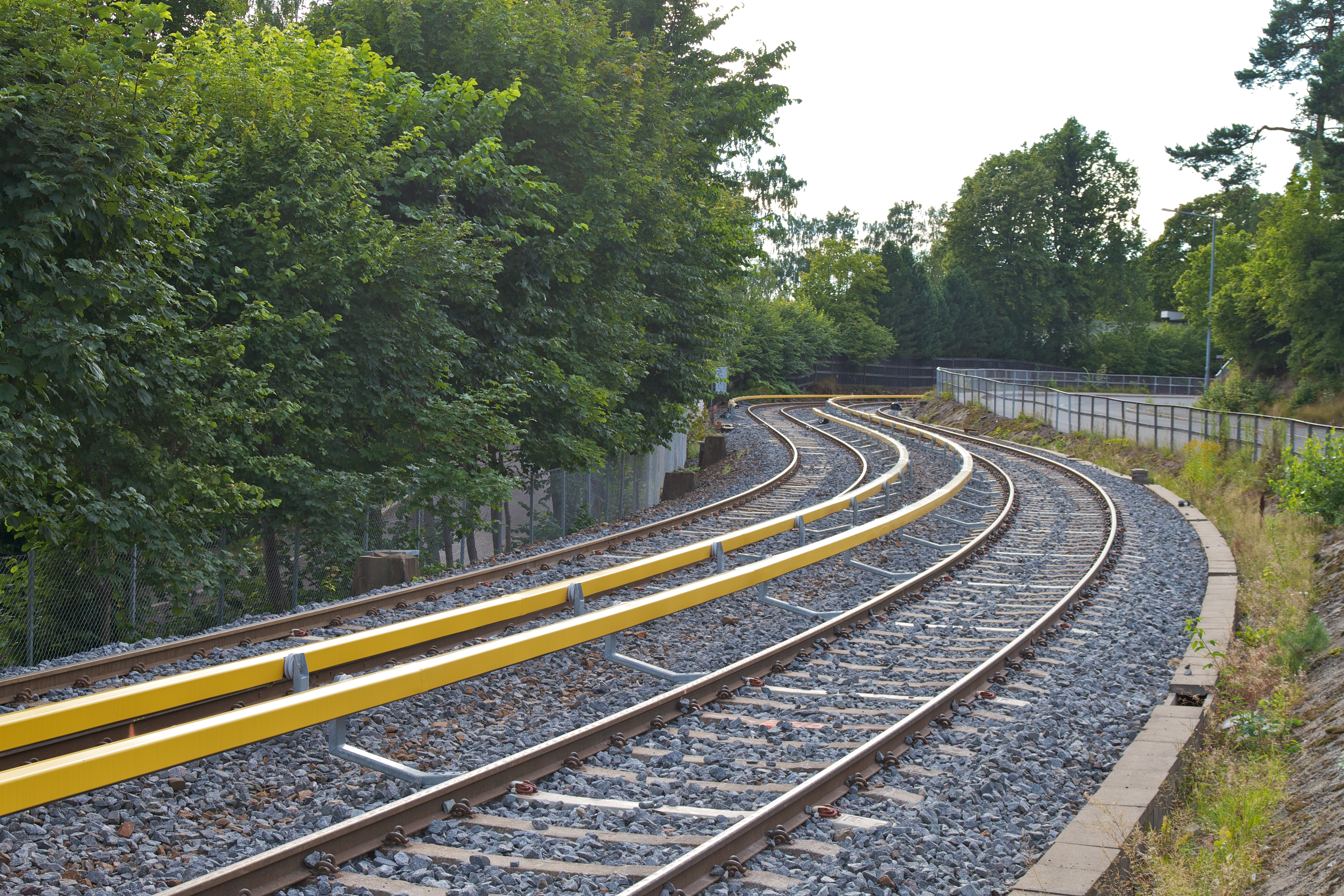
The line near Slemdalsveien after it was upgraded to metro standard

On 25 May 2006, Oslo was awarded the FIS Nordic World Ski Championships 2011, which would be held at Holmenkollen National Arena. The running of the tournament was based on that none of the 370,000 spectators during the eleven days would use cars, and all would have to use public transport. In order to allow increased capacity on the line, it would either have to be connected to the street tramway, or upgraded to metro standard. The latter involves installing a third-rail power supply, lengthening platforms and installing a new signalling system.

The proposal for the tramway involved connecting the Holmenkollen Line to the Briskeby Line via Slemdalsveien after Frøen. The overhead wire would be kept and the platforms lowered to suit low-floor trams. They would continue from Majorstuen to the city center via the street tram system. Travel time would be slightly increased, in part because of more stops along the line, including serving the main campus of Oslo University College and the shopping area in Bogstadveien. Connecting to the tramway would also decrease the headway from 15 to 10 minutes. Proponents of the tramway argued that this solution was cheaper, that it would give more travelers. On the other hand, there is an insufficient number of trams to operate the line, which could mean a procurement process for trams would have to be started. For the championships themselves, a metro solution would give 9,000 passengers per hour, compared to 3,000 for a tramway.

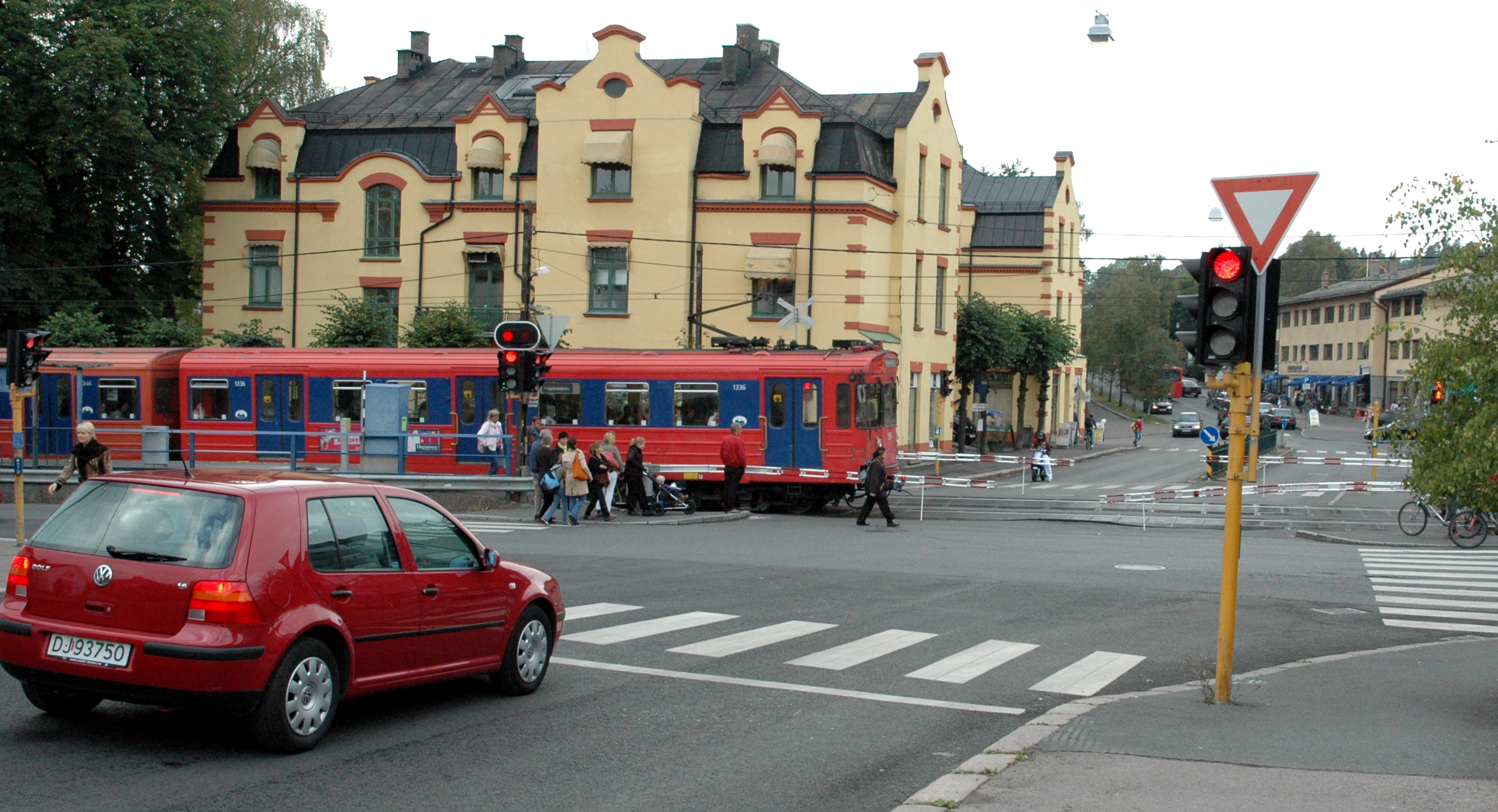
While the overhead wire and T1300 trains are gone, level crossings, such as this one at Vinderen, remain.

Ruter recommended converting the line to a tramway. In April, the city council decided to upgrade the line to partial metro standard. The only station to be upgraded was Holmenkollen, which would serve Holmenkollen National Arena during the games. It was rebuilt with 115-metre (377 ft) platforms for six-car trains and cost NOK 55 million. The costs from the renovation was NOK 400 million, which included a new signaling and third rail power supply, in addition to a renovation of the tracks. Stations retained the same length, which is designed for two-car trains. The three-car MX3000 trains will therefore have to operate with the doors in the back car locked while running on the Holmenkollen Line.

In December 2008, Ruter stated that it was considering building a tunnel from the Holmenkollen Line which would run to the area next to the ski-jumping hill. Holmenkollen Station is located 1 km (0.62 mi) from the hill, which is furthermore not visible from the station. The proposal would have cost an additional NOK 260 million and involved the building of a new station, either underground or at ground level. It entailed closing the line above Holmenkollen and serving the area with a bus. However, this was rejected by the city council.

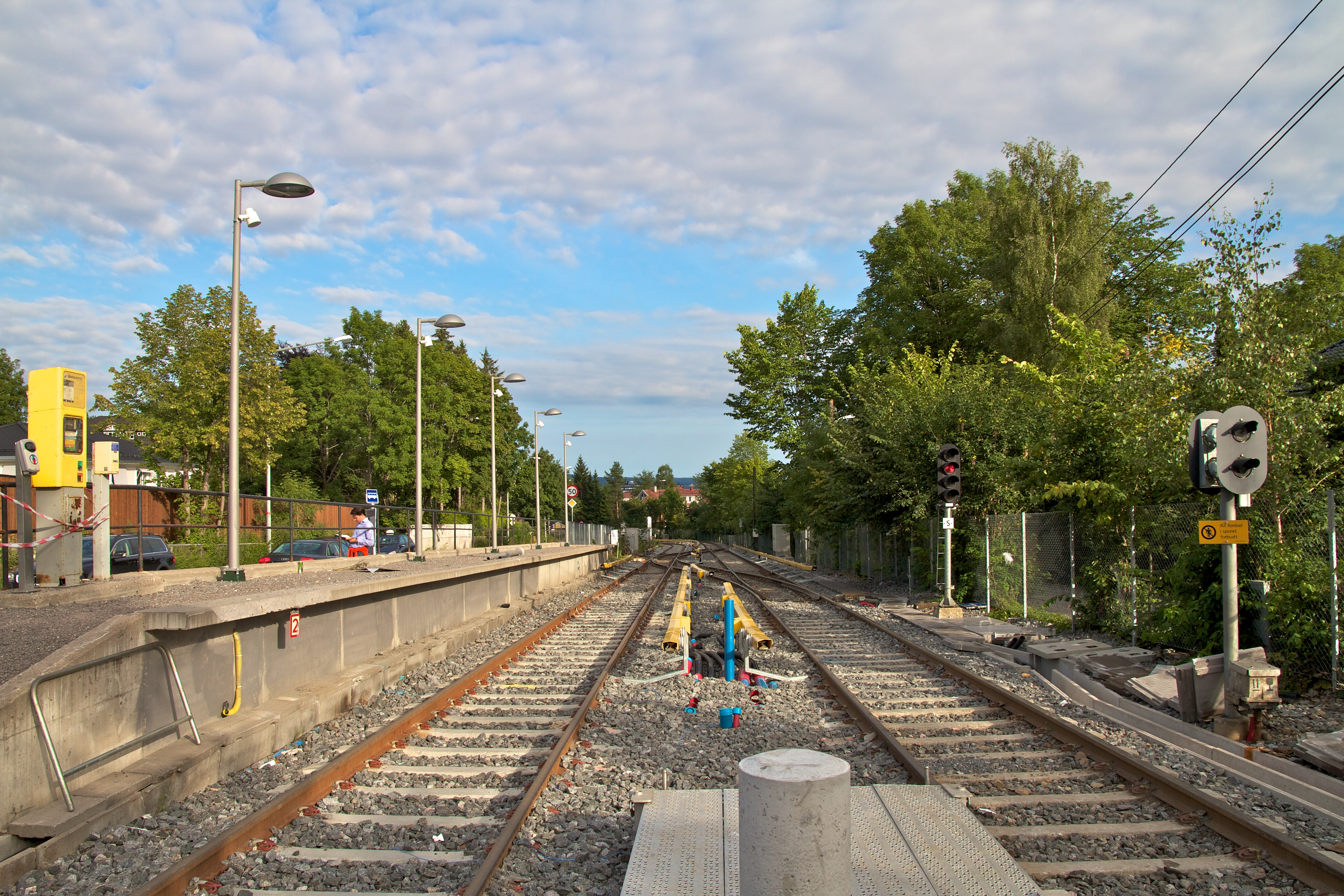
Ris Station

The line is the metro's only section with level crossings, as the other lines had theirs removed when they were upgraded. Locals have been opposed to this solution, stating that they fear children will run into the tracks and get a lethal current through them, and that the municipality chose to take a shortcut to get the line finished in time for the World Championships. The upgrade was also criticized by representatives for disabled people. The city council decision from 2008 stated that all the stations were to be universally accessible, but lack of time during the upgrade meant that none of the stations, except Holmenkollen, were touched. Because of this, the stations remain inaccessible for people with wheelchairs. Gulleråsen Station was closed in the direction towards the city. The station is located in a sharp curve and would receive a 54-centimetre (21 in) gap between the platform and the train. In comparison, the T2000 trains had a 40-centimetre (16 in) gap at the station.

In 2009, the Holmenkollen Line closed for construction and all twelve T2000 units were taken out of service, before the last of the much older T1300. Demonstrations against the closing of Gulleråsen Station took place during the reopening on 6 December 2010. The upgrade to metro standard allowed the T2000 trains to be retired, so the entire metro would be only operating MX3000 trains. Kollektivtransportproduksjon stated that procuring spare parts was becoming nearly impossible and that the small size of the series forced high maintenance costs. The initial orders for MX3000 trains did not call for sufficient numbers to replace the T2000. Kollektivtransportproduksjon has estimated the cost of renovating the units so they can run for 15 more years at NOK 50 million. Alternatively, the city council has been recommended by Kollektivtransportproduksjon to purchase five new MX3000 three-car trains for NOK 250 million. Following the World Championships, Ruter plans to decide which stations will be kept and which will be closed, and subsequently rebuild those which will be kept.

== Literature ==
- Andersen, Bjørn (1993). Holmenkollbanen – kort historikk fra 1898 til 1993. Oslo: Lokaltrafikkhistorisk forening.
- Erichsen, Egil W. (1973). Holmenkolbanen 1948–1973. Oslo: A/S Holmenkolbanens styre.
- Holden, Finn (2000). Vinderen – fra fangstboplass til moderne bydel. Oslo: Baneforlaget.
- Nilsen, Knut A. (1998). Nordmarkstrikken – Holmenkollbanen gjennom 100 år. Oslo: Aschehoug.
- Orvin, Harald W. (1992). Fra Majorstuen til Holmenkollen. Oslo: Risbladet. ISBN 8299279402.
- Strandholt, Thorleif (1986). A/S Holmenkolbanen 1896–1975. Oslo: Sporvejhistorisk Selskab.
