= Frognerseteren station =

Oslo metro station

Frognerseteren
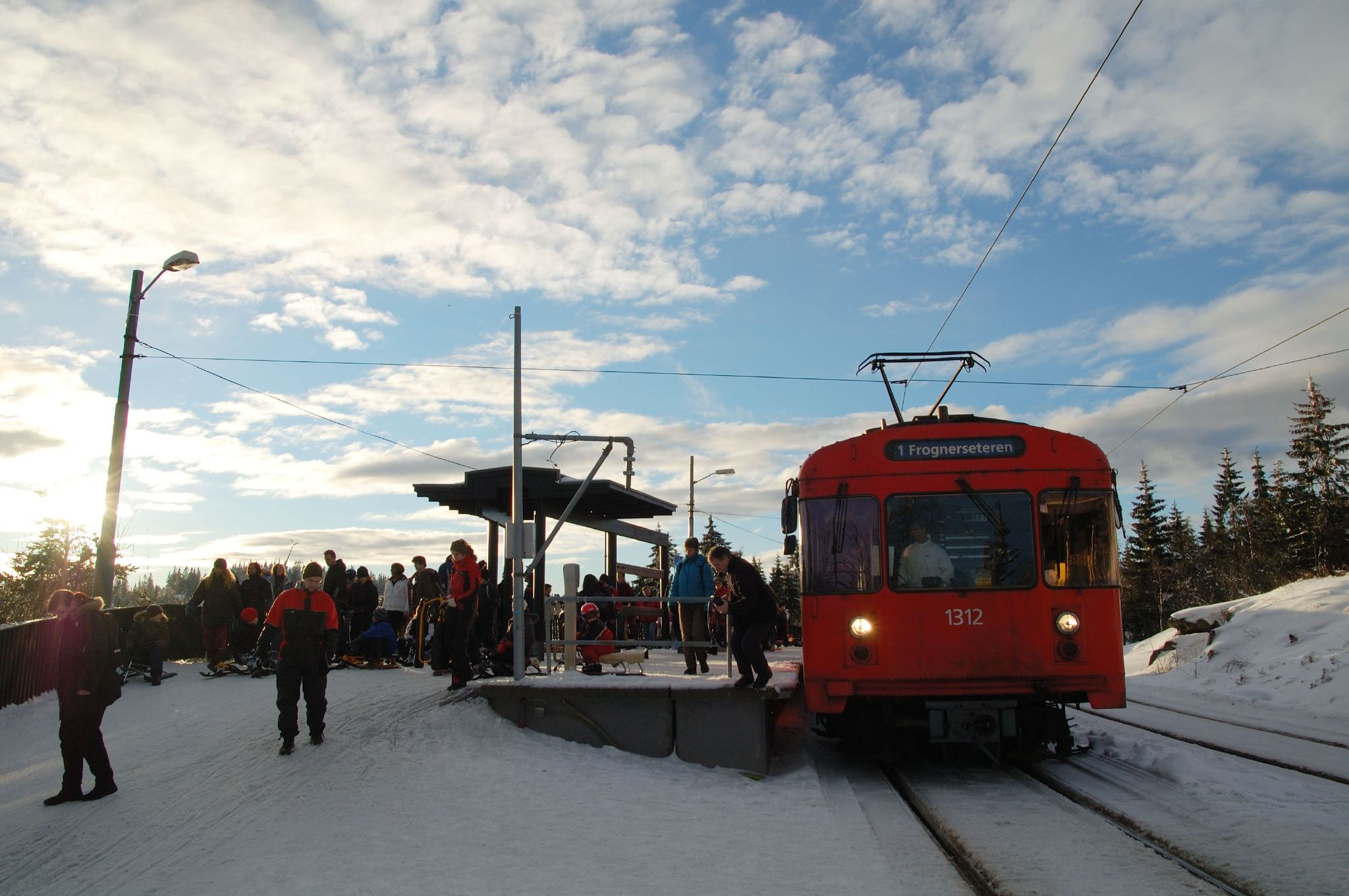

General information
- Location: Nordmarka, Oslo; Norway
- Coordinates: 59°58′44″N 10°40′40″E
- Elevation: 469.0 m (1,538.7 ft)
- Owner: Sporveien
- Operator: Sporveien T-banen
- Line: Holmenkollen Line
- Distance: 14.3 km (8.9 mi) from Stortinget

Construction
- Structure type: At-grade
- Accessible: Yes

History
- Opened: 16 May 1916

Services
Preceding station	Oslo Metro	Following station
Terminus	Line 1	Voksenkollen towards Bergkrystallen
Location

Frognerseteren is the end station of the Holmenkollen Line of the Oslo Metro, located in the Marka section of Oslo, the capital city of Norway. It is the northernmost station in Oslo Metro, and is the station after Voksenkollen. The line to Frognerseteren was completed on 16 May 1916. The station has two platforms which, like other stations on the Holmenkollen Line, only accommodate two-car trains. The elevation of the station is 469 meters (1,539 ft) above sea level, the highest of all the stations in Oslo. The elevation difference between this station and the lowest in Oslo Metro (Stortinget), 478 meters (1,568 ft), is the highest elevation difference within a metro network in the world.

The area around Frognerseteren has very little population, but is popular for recreation, with a restaurant and hiking trails or, during the winter, skiing. Tryvannstårnet is also within walking distance although Voksenkollen station is slightly closer.

== The name ==
Originally this place was the seter (mountain dairy farm) of Frogner Manor.
